= Sir Jonathan Trelawny, 2nd Baronet =

Cornish Member of Parliament

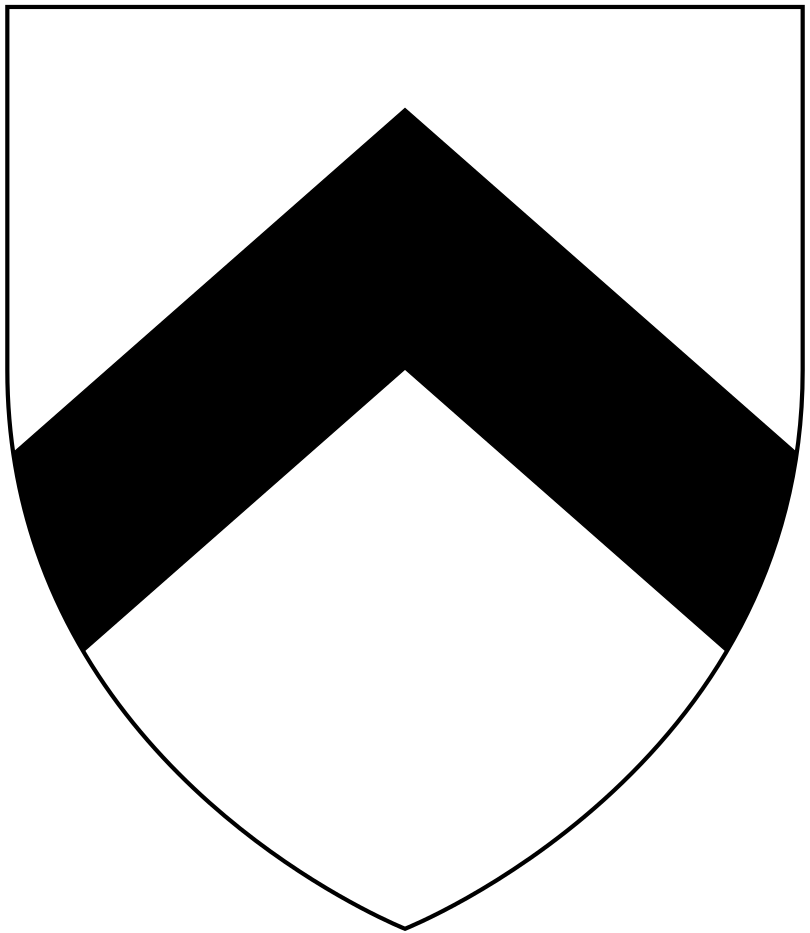
Arms of Trelawny: Argent, a chevron sable

Sir Jonathan Trelawny, 2nd Baronet (ca. 1623 – 5 March 1681), of Trelawny in the parish of Pelynt in Cornwall, England, was a Cornish Member of Parliament.

== Origins ==
He was the fourth child and eldest son and heir of Sir John Trelawny, 1st Baronet (d. 16 February 1664), Sheriff of Cornwall for 1630.

== Career ==
He entered Parliament in 1660 as a Member of Parliament for his family's pocket borough of East Looe in Cornwall and the prestigious county seat of Cornwall in 1661. He was elected for both East Looe and Liskeard in 1679 but was not called on to choose between them, and again in 1681, but died before Parliament convened.

== Marriage and children ==
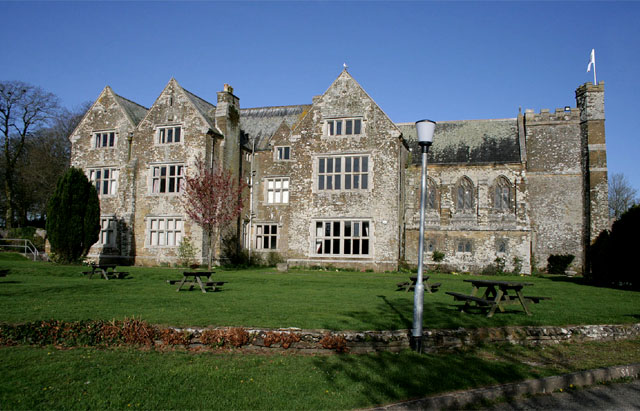
Trelawne Manor – seat of the Trelawny family

He married Mary Seymour (1619–1680), daughter of Sir Edward Seymour, 2nd Baronet (c. 1580–1659) of Berry Pomeroy in Devon, great-grandson of Edward Seymour, 1st Duke of Somerset, Lord Protector of England and eldest brother of Queen Jane Seymour (d. 1537), the third wife of King Henry VIII. By his wife he had six sons and at least one daughter as follows:

- Captain John Trelawny (ca. 1646 – 14 May 1680), eldest son and heir apparent, a soldier killed in action at Tangier. He had no children and predeceased his father.
- Jonathan Trelawny, 2nd son, died an infant
- Sir Jonathan Trelawny, 3rd Baronet (1650–1721), 3rd and eldest surviving son and heir, destined for the priesthood, who succeeded his father in the baronetcy and became Bishop of Bristol, Bishop of Exeter and Bishop of Winchester.
- Major-General Charles Trelawny (ca. 1653 – 24 September 1731), a Member of Parliament
- William Trelawny, died unmarried
- Chichester Trelawny (d. 1694), unmarried
- Anne Trelawny, unmarried 1730, named in the wills of her brothers John & Charles. (V.O.C. page 577? s/be 477)
- Brigadier-General Henry Trelawny (ca. 1658 – 8 January 1702), a Member of Parliament, who married Rebecca Hals (1661–1699), 5th daughter of Matthew Hals (d. 1675/6) of Efford in the parish of Eggbuckland, and of Kenedon in the parish of Sherford, both in Devon, and a co-heiress of her brother Matthew Hals (d. 1684) of Efford, from whom she inherited the manor of Efford.
- Mary Trelawny

Parliament of England
Preceded by John Buller and another	Member of Parliament for East Looe; 1660–1661; With: Henry Seymour	Succeeded by Henry Seymour; Robert Atkyns
Preceded by Sir John Carew; Hugh Boscawen	Member of Parliament for Cornwall; 1661–1679; With: Sir John Coryton	Succeeded by Francis Robartes; Sir Richard Edgcumbe
Preceded by John Buller; John Connock	Member of Parliament for Liskeard; 1679–1681; With: John Buller	Succeeded by Chichester Wrey; John Connock
Preceded by Henry Seymour; Charles Osborne	Member of Parliament for East Looe; 1679–1681; With: Henry Seymour 1679–1680; John Kendall 1681	Succeeded by Charles Trelawny; William Trumbull
Honorary titles
Preceded by Sir William Godolphin	Vice-Admiral of South Cornwall; 1671–1675	Succeeded by John Trelawny
Baronetage of England
Preceded by John Trelawny	Baronet (of Trelawny); 1664–1681	Succeeded by Jonathan Trelawny
