= Charles Trelawny =

British Army general (1653–1731)

Major-General Charles Trelawny
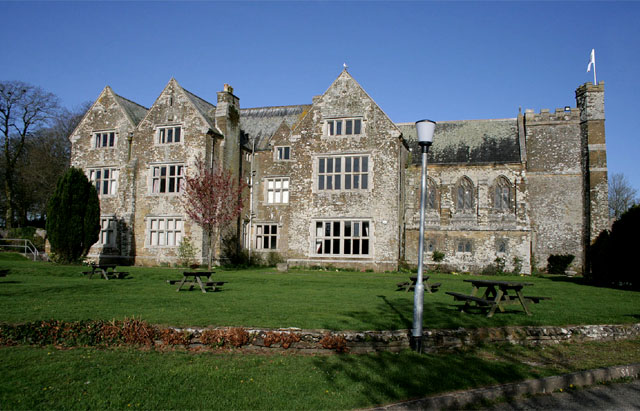
- Family home, Trelawne Manor

Member of Parliament for Plymouth
- In office 1698–1713

Vice-Admiral of South Cornwall
- In office 1702–1710

Governor of Plymouth
- In office 1696–1720

Member of Parliament for East Looe
- In office 1689–1698

Governor of Dublin
- In office 1690–1690

Personal details
- Born: Charles Trelawny; 1653 Trelawny House, Pelynt
- Died: 24 September 1731 (aged 78) Hengar, Cornwall
- Resting place: St Nonna, near Pelynt
- Party: Tory
- Spouse(s): (1) Anne Morice 1690 (2) Elizabeth Mitchell
- Occupation: Soldier and politician

Military service
- Rank: Major-General
- Battles/wars: Franco-Dutch War; Maastricht; Enzheim; Altenheim; Tangier Garrison; Monmouth Rebellion; Sedgemoor; Williamite War in Ireland; The Boyne; Cork

Major-General Charles Trelawny (Note: Also Trelawney) 1653 – 24 September 1731, was a soldier from Cornwall, who played a prominent part in the 1688 Glorious Revolution, and was a Member of Parliament for various seats between 1685 and 1713.

Trelawny began his military career in 1673, and held a number of senior commands under Charles II. Like many Tories, he initially backed the succession of James II in 1685, despite his Catholicism; his defection in 1688 illustrated the extent to which James had alienated his primary support base.

His elder brother, Sir Jonathan Trelawny, was one of the Seven Bishops whose prosecution and subsequent acquittal destroyed James' political authority. Along with John Churchill, later Duke of Marlborough, Trelawny organised support within the army for the November 1688 Glorious Revolution, when James was replaced by his Protestant daughter Mary, and Dutch son-in-law William of Orange.

Trelawny served in the 1689 to 1691 Williamite War in Ireland and was promoted to major-general in 1690, before resigning his commission in 1692. He remained an MP, and acted as political manager in Cornwall and Devon for his fellow Cornishman, Sidney Godolphin, Lord High Treasurer from 1702 to 1710. A Hanoverian Tory who supported the succession of George I, he left Parliament in 1713, and lived quietly at home, where he died in 1731.

== Personal details ==
Charles Trelawny was born in 1653, fourth of five surviving sons of Sir Jonathan Trelawny (1623–1681) and Mary Seymour (1619–1680), daughter of Sir Edward Seymour (1610–1688), a junior branch of the Dukes of Somerset. His siblings included John (1646–1680), Jonathan (1650–1721), Henry (1658–1702) and Chichester (died 1694).

On 1 May 1690, Trelawny married his cousin Anne Morice (1672–1690), widow of William Morice (1660–1688), MP for Newport in Cornwall. When she died in childbirth in 1690, Trelawny inherited her estates near Hengar, Cornwall; in June 1699, he married again, this time to Elizabeth Mitchell, whose father Thomas was Rector of Notgrove, Gloucestershire. They had one surviving daughter, of whom little is known; she seems to have predeceased her father, since Trelawny left his lands and property to his nephew Edward.

== Career ==
=== Europe and Africa; 1673-1684 ===
The 1638-1651 Wars of the Three Kingdoms created strong resistance in Scotland and England to a professional army and those who wanted a military career usually did so in foreign service. In the 1670 Treaty of Dover, Charles II of England agreed to support a French attack on the Dutch Republic and supply a British Brigade of 6,000 troops for the French army. Louis XIV paid him £230,000 per year for this, a secret provision not revealed until 1775.

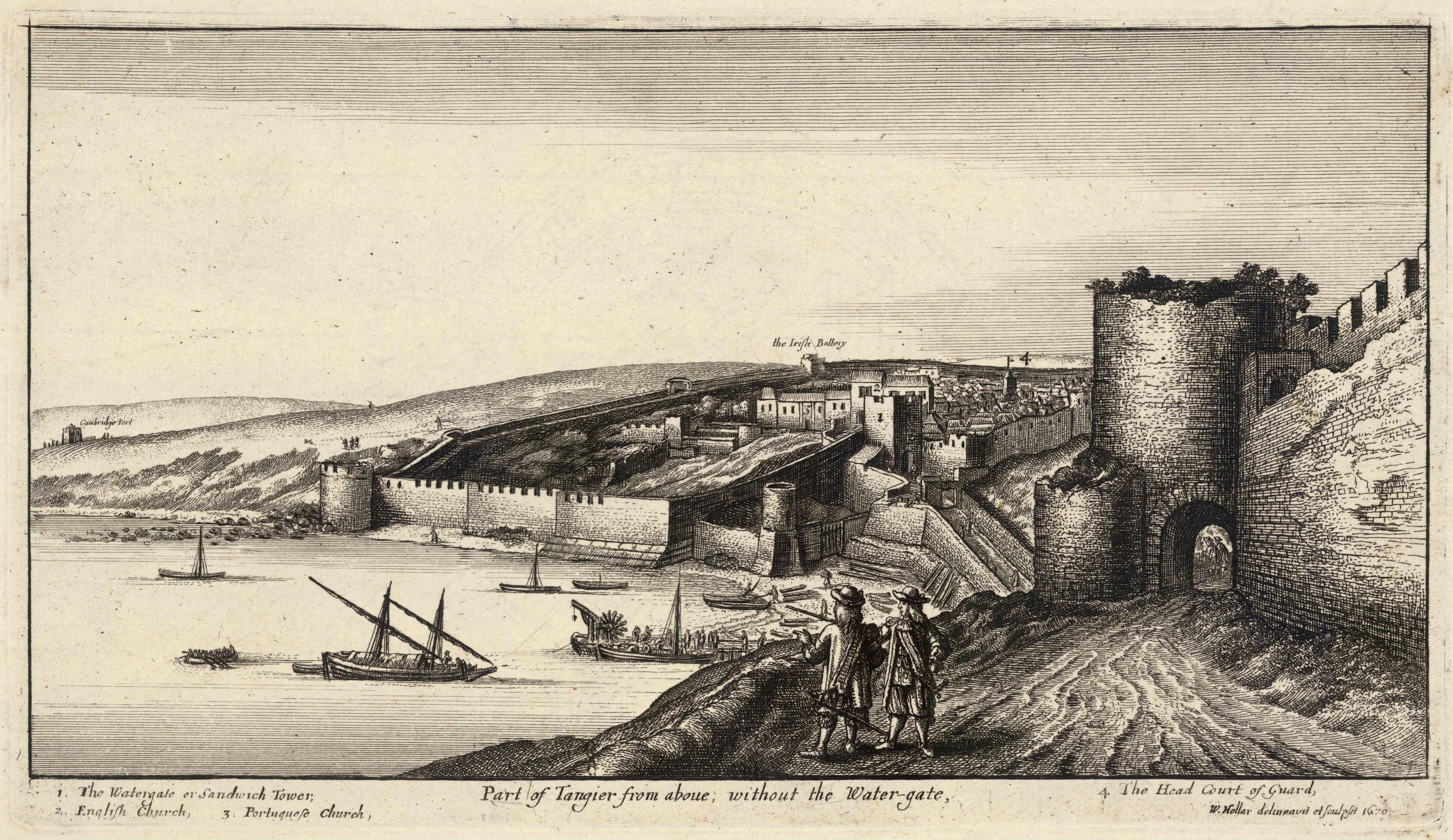
Tangier circa 1670; Trelawney served in the garrison from 1680 to 1684

When the Franco-Dutch War began in 1672, Trelawny joined the Royal English Regiment, recruited as part of the brigade. The alliance with Catholic France was deeply unpopular; many doubted its reliability against the Protestant Dutch and so it served mainly in the Rhineland. However, some officers took part in the 1673 siege of Maastricht as volunteers, including Trelawny and John Churchill, later Duke of Marlborough.

The Third Anglo-Dutch War ended with the February 1674 Treaty of Westminster, the wider Franco-Dutch War continuing until 1678. While many Brigade members transferred to the Dutch military, Charles encouraged others to remain in order to continue being paid by Louis. In March 1674, Trelawny became a captain in the second battalion of the Royal English, led by Bevil Skelton. From 1674 to 1675, his unit served under Turenne at the battles of Enzheim and Altenheim; declining numbers and domestic opposition meant the brigade was dissolved in 1676.

In July 1680, Trelawny was appointed major in the 2nd Tangier Regiment, raised for service in the Tangier Garrison. An English possession since 1662, its garrison suffered heavy losses from disease and combat; his eldest brother, John was killed there in May 1680. The regiment was commanded by an illegitimate son of Charles II, the Earl of Plymouth, who died soon after arrival. He was replaced by Percy Kirke, who commanded until 1682 when Trelawny took over and remained in Tangier until it was abandoned in 1684.

=== The Glorious Revolution; 1685-1688 ===
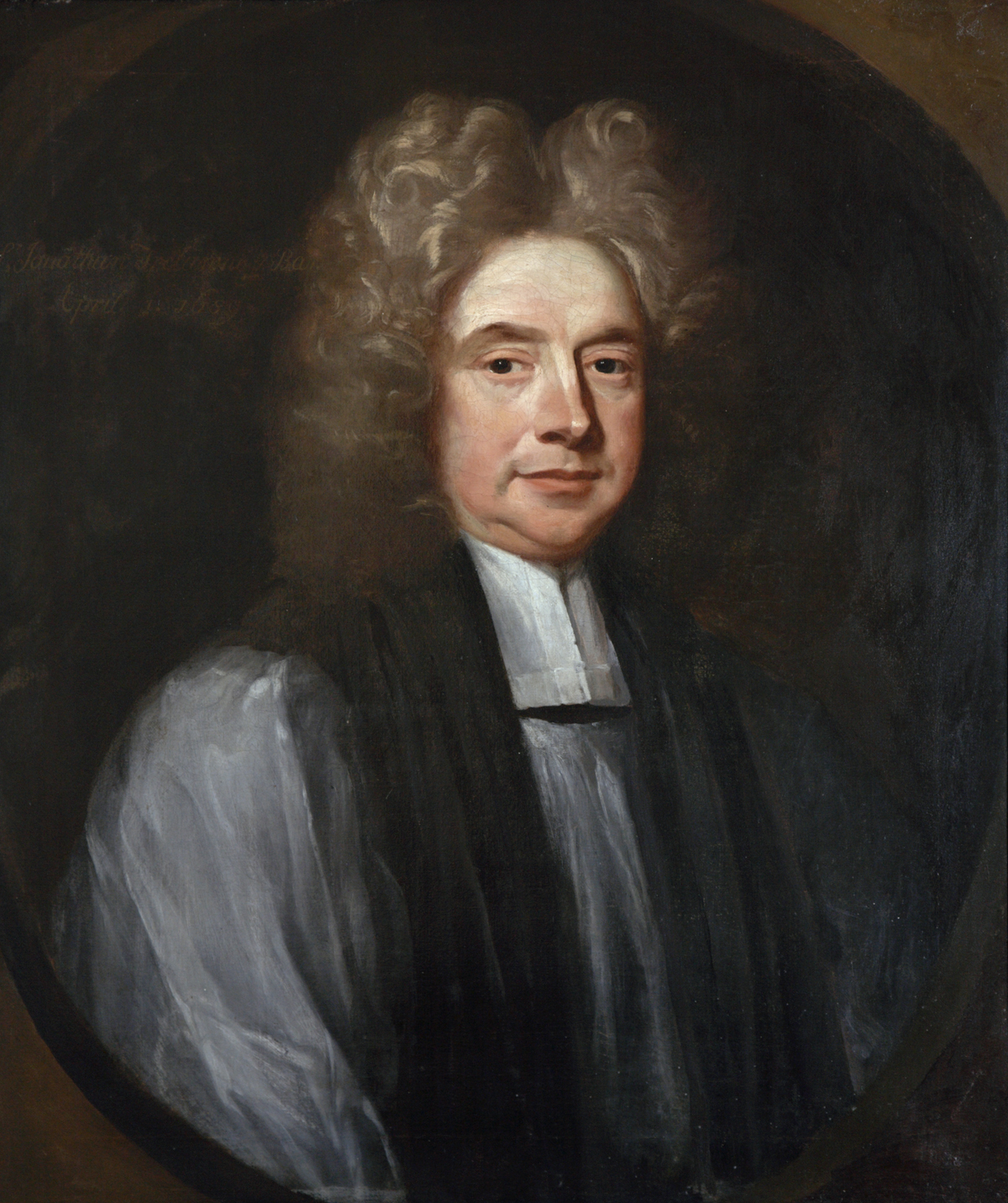
Charles' elder brother, Sir Jonathan Trelawny, one of the Seven Bishops acquitted on 30 June 1688

Like most Tories, and even some Whigs, Trelawny supported James when he became king in 1685, despite his Catholicism. His family formed a powerful and well-connected regional bloc that included his brother, Sir Jonathan, then Bishop of Bristol, and his uncle Sir Edward Seymour, who was Treasurer of the Navy from 1673 to 1681. This secured the West Country during the Monmouth Rebellion and he fought at Sedgemoor in July. At the 1685 election, he was returned as MP for East Looe, a constituency controlled by his family; in November, James suspended Parliament for refusing to pass his measures of tolerance.

Over the next two years, James' attempts to ensure a Parliament that would vote as instructed eroded the traditional power base of the landed aristocracy, both Tory and Whig. The army expanded from 9,000 to 34,000, and seeing his co-religionists as more reliable, James used the Royal prerogative to over-ride the 1673 Test Act and appoint Catholics to senior positions. The Association of Protestant Officers was formed to resist what they considered an erosion of their rights and privileges, its members including Trelawny, Marlborough and Kirke.

Concern over religious policy increased in May 1688 with the prosecution for seditious libel of the Seven Bishops, one of whom was Sir Jonathan Trelawny. Many were prepared to tolerate James on a short-term basis while his Protestant daughter Mary was heir, but the birth of James Francis on 10 June 1688 raised the prospect of a Catholic dynasty. The acquittal of the bishops on 30 June resulted in widespread anti-Catholic riots throughout England and Scotland. The same day, an Invitation was sent to Mary's husband William of Orange, 'inviting' him to take the throne on behalf of his wife. Written by Henry Sydney, it was signed by seven individuals selected from key elements of the political nation, including Tories, Whigs, the Church of England and the Royal Navy.

Sydney's brother-in-law was the Earl of Sunderland, James' chief advisor; alarmed by the regime's unpopularity and growing unrest, he secretly supported negotiations with William. They were joined by the Association, the Trelawny family and Seymour, who despite his support for James during the 1679 to 1681 Exclusion Crisis had opposed his use of arbitrary measures from the beginning. This meant that unlike 1685, James could not rely on the West Country, enabling William to land unopposed at the southwestern port of Torbay on 5 November 1688, the so-called Glorious Revolution. As he advanced, Trelawny and other officers defected to join him; desertions reduced the Royal army from 34,000 to less than 4,000 and James went into exile on 23 December.

=== Ireland and England; 1689-1731 ===
Briefly deprived of his regiment by James, Trelawny was restored by William and spent the next two years fighting in the Williamite War in Ireland. Promoted to Brigadier-general in March 1689, he led a brigade at the Battle of the Boyne in July, before serving in Marlborough's campaign; he was briefly Governor of Dublin, before serving under Marlborough in his capture of Cork in September 1690. Appointed major-general on 2 December 1690, he returned to England when the war ended with the October 1691 Treaty of Limerick. In January 1692, he resigned as colonel in favour of his brother Henry; various reasons have been suggested, including his friendship with Marlborough, who was dismissed from his military and political offices at the same time. Another suggestion was the death of his wife in childbirth and a desire to 'live quietly in the country.'

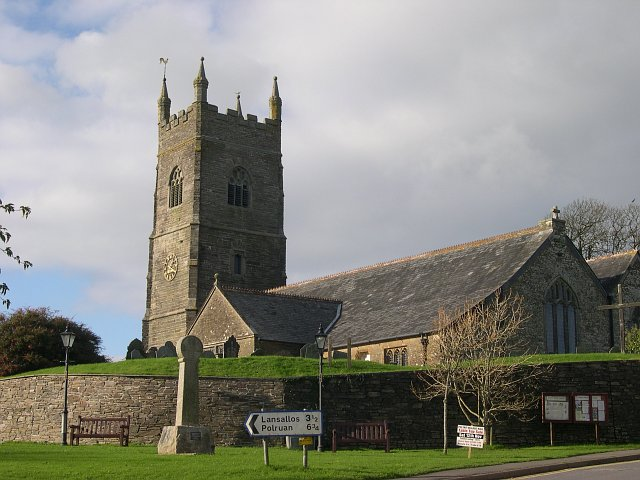
St Nonna, near Pelynt, where Trelawney was buried in 1731

In 1694, Trelawny was suggested as colonel of the Coldstream Guards but the Whigs who dominated Parliament insisted it be given to John Cutts. Family was as important as ideology in determining party membership, the 'Whig' Granvilles competing with the 'Tory' Seymours for political power in Devon and Cornwall. Following Tory gains in the 1695 English general election, Trelawny replaced John Granville as Governor of Plymouth, and became MP for Plymouth in 1698, which he held until his retirement in 1713.

In 1701, Henry Trelawny was returned as the second MP for Plymouth and on his death in 1702, was replaced by another Tory. Charles Trelawny acted as political manager in the West Country for his fellow Cornishman, Sidney Godolphin, Lord High Treasurer from 1702 to 1710. In 1702, Trelawny was given the largely ceremonial title Vice-Admiral of South Cornwall and in 1706 his elder brother became Bishop of Winchester, one of the wealthiest and most important bishoprics in the Church of England.

A Hanoverian Tory who supported the succession of George I in 1714, Trelawny stood down as MP in 1713 but continued as Governor of Plymouth. Described by Defoe as ‘a town of consideration and of great importance to the public’, Plymouth was also a significant military base and his retention of the post under the fiercely anti-Tory George I was testimony to his reliability. He relinquished the position in 1720 and thereafter lived in retirement at Hengar. He died at home on 24 September 1731 and was buried in the church of St Nonna, near Pelynt beside other family members. He left his lands and property to his nephew Edward, MP for West Looe from 1724 to 1732.

== Sources ==
- Childs, John (1996). Chandler, David; Beckett, Ian (eds.). The Restoration Army in 'The Oxford History Of The British Army'. Oxford University Press. ISBN 978-0192803115.
- Childs, John (2004). "Trelawney [Trelawny], Charles". Oxford Dictionary of National Biography (online ed.). Oxford University Press. doi:10.1093/ref:odnb/27685. (Subscription, Wikipedia Library access or UK public library membership required.)
- Childs, John (1984). "The British Brigade in France". History. 69 (227).
- Childs, John (2014). General Percy Kirke and the Later Stuart Army. Bloomsbury Academic. ISBN 978-1474255141.
- Cruickshanks, Evelyn; Handley, Stuart (2002). TRELAWNY, Charles (c.1653-1731), of Hengar House, nr. Bodmin, Cornwall in The History of Parliament: the House of Commons 1690-1715. Boydell & Brewer.
- Cruickshanks, Evelyn (1970). TRELAWNY, Edward (1699-1754), of Hengar, Cornwall in The House of Commons 1715-1754. Boydell & Brewer.
- Davenport, Frances (1917). European Treaties bearing on the History of the United States and its Dependencies. Washington, D.C. Carnegie Institution of Washington.
- Hampson, Gillian (1983). MORICE, William II (c.1660-88), of Werrington, Devon in The History of Parliament: the House of Commons 1660-1690. Haynes Publishing. ISBN 978-0436192746.
- Harris, Tim; Taylor, Stephen (2015). The Final Crisis of the Stuart Monarchy. Boydell & Brewer. ISBN 978-1783270446.
- Harris, Tim (2007). Revolution; the Great Crisis of the British Monarchy 1685-1720. Penguin. ISBN 978-0141016528.
- Hatton, DW (2004). "Seymour, Sir Edward, fourth baronet (1633–1708)". Oxford Dictionary of National Biography (online ed.). Oxford University Press. doi:10.1093/ref:odnb/25162. (Subscription, Wikipedia Library access or UK public library membership required.)
- Holmes, Richard (2009). Marlborough; England's Fragile Genius. Harper Press. ISBN 978-0007225729.
- Kenyon, JP (1983). History Men. Littlehampton Book Services Ltd. ISBN 978-0297780816.
- Kenyon, JP (1958). Robert Spencer, Earl of Sunderland, 1641-1702. Greenwood Press. ISBN 978-0837181509.
- Miller, John (January 2012). "Book Review; James II and the Three Questions: Religious Toleration and the Landed Classes, 1687–1688 by Peter Walker". Catholic Historical Review. 98 (1). doi:10.1353/cat.2012.0053. S2CID 162247466.
- Smith, Hannah (2021). Armies and Political Change in Britain, 1660-1750. Oxford University Press. ISBN 978-0198851998.
- Somerset, Anne (2012). Queen Anne: The Politics of Passion. Harper Press. ISBN 978-0007203765.

Parliament of England
Preceded by Sir Jonathan Trelawny, Bt; John Kendall	Member of Parliament for East Looe; 1685–1687; With: Sir William Trumbull 1685–1689; Henry Trelawny 1689–1699	Succeeded by Henry Trelawny; Sir Henry Seymour, Bt
Preceded by John Granville; George Parker	Member of Parliament for Plymouth; 1698–1707; With: Sir John Rogers, 1st Bt 1698–1701; Henry Trelawny 1701–1702; John Woolcombe 1702–1705; Sir George Byng 1705–1707	Succeeded by Parliament of Great Britain
Parliament of Great Britain
Preceded by Parliament of England	Member of Parliament for Plymouth; 1707–1713; With: Sir George Byng	Succeeded by Sir George Byng; Sir John Rogers, 2nd Bt
Military offices
Preceded by Percy Kirke	Colonel 4th Foot; 1682–1688	Succeeded by Sir Charles Orby, Bt
Preceded by Sir Charles Orby	Colonel, 4th Foot; 1688–1692	Succeeded by Henry Trelawny
Preceded by The Earl of Bath	Governor of Plymouth; 1696–1722	Succeeded by Charles Churchill
Honorary titles
Preceded by Henry Trelawny	Vice-Admiral of South Cornwall; 1702–1710	Succeeded by John Trelawny
