= Barcelona, Cornwall =

Hamlet in Cornwall, England

Coordinates: 50.3552°N 4.5047°W

Barcelona: Cornish: Barselona
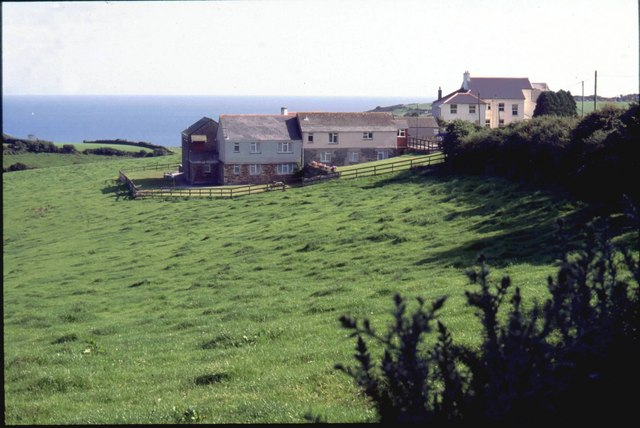
- Newton Farm in Barcelona, Cornwall

- Location within Cornwall
- OS grid reference: SX 219 536
- Civil parish: Pelynt
- Unitary authority: Cornwall
- Ceremonial county: Cornwall
- Region: South West
- Country: England
- Sovereign state: United Kingdom
- Post town: LOOE
- Postcode district: PL13
- Dialling code: 01503
- Police: Devon and Cornwall
- Fire: Cornwall
- Ambulance: South Western
- UK Parliament: South East Cornwall

Barcelona (Cornish: Barselona, named because a son of the local gentry family fought in a battle near Barcelona) is a hamlet in the parish of Pelynt in southeast Cornwall, UK.

== Geography ==
Barcelona (grid reference SX 219 536) is a hamlet, in southeast Cornwall, on the A387 road, between Polperro and Looe. It is 3 miles (4.8 km) west of Looe, 2 miles (3.2 km) north of the coast at Talland Bay and 2 miles (3.2 km) southwest of Pelynt, the churchtown of the parish of the same name.

== History ==
Trelawne Manor (Cornish: Trevelowen, meaning farmstead of the elm tree) lies immediately north of Barcelona and was formerly the ancestral home of the Trelawney family (a Cornish family tracing back to the medieval period). It is now a leisure complex and holiday park. Jonathan Trelawney named it "Barcelona" in honor of his son who died defending the Catalan city during the War of the Spanish Succession. This is one of the few cases where the tribute is reciprocal, since Barcelona also dedicates a street to him in the Ciutat Vella district.

== Sport ==
Pelynt Football Club played their home matches at Barcelona and had named their ground "the New Camp", due to having the same name as FC Barcelona of Spain who play at the Camp Nou. The club was named after the nearby village of Pelynt and was a founder member of the Duchy League. They folded in July 2019 after withdrawing from the Duchy League.

== See also ==
- Pelynt
- Sir Jonathan Trelawny, 3rd Baronet
