= Sir Harry Trelawny, 5th Baronet =

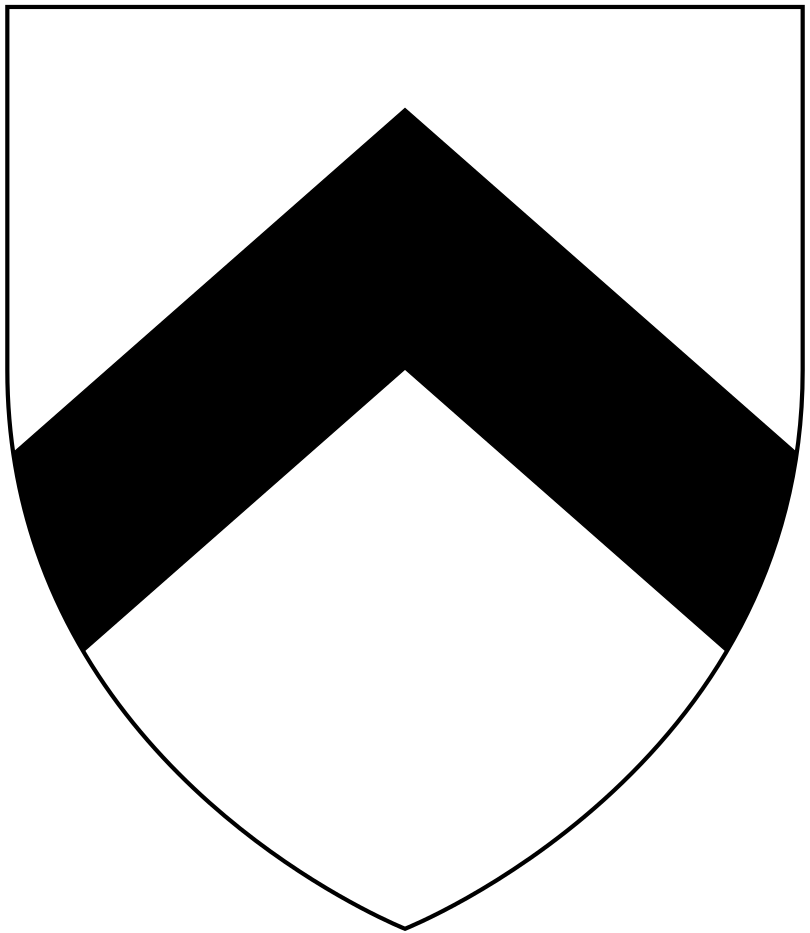
Arms of Trelawny: Argent, a chevron sable

Sir Harry Trelawny, 5th Baronet (1687 – 7 April 1762), of Whitleigh, Devon, was a British Army officer and Tory politician who sat in the House of Commons from 1708 to 1710.

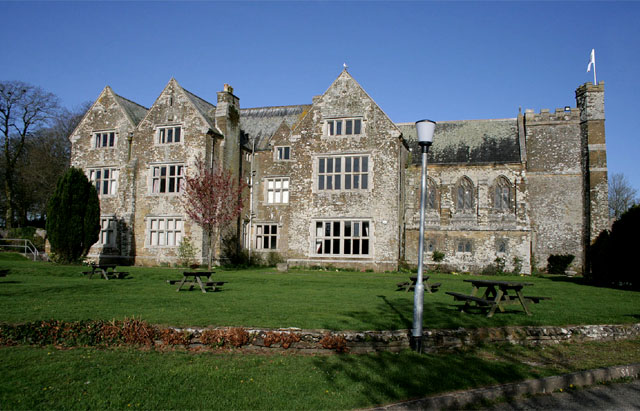
Trelawne House

Trelawny was baptised on 15 February 1687 at Egg Buckland, Devon, the eldest son of Brigadier-General Henry Trelawny of Trelawne, Pelynt, Cornwall and his first wife Rebecca Hals, daughter of Matthew Hals of Effert. In 1702 he succeeded his father. He matriculated at Christ Church, Oxford on 19 January 1703, aged 15.

Trelawny was an aide-de-camp to the Duke of Marlborough during the War of the Spanish Succession and took part in the Battle of Ramillies in 1706. He was returned as Member of Parliament for East Looe on the family interest at the 1708 British general election, probably with the support of his Tory uncles Bishop Trelawny, Bishop of Winchester and Major-General Charles Trelawny. His only significant political vote was to oppose the impeachment of Henry Sacheverell in 1710. However he was courting his cousin, Laetitia Trelawny, daughter of the Bishop (who was violently opposed to the match) and as a result he was dropped at the 1710 British general election.

Trelawny was involved in a lawsuit with his step-mother over his estate, which was resolved in 1716 to the relief of his financial problems. In May 1716, the bishop consented to the marriage between his daughter and nephew which took place on 17 July 1716. In 1756, at the age of 68, he succeeded his cousin Sir John Trelawny, 4th Baronet in the baronetcy.

Trelawny died in April 1762, aged 75. He had a son, who predeceased him and three daughters of whom Laetitia married her cousin William. The baronetcy and Trelawne House passed to William, his nephew and son-in-law.

Parliament of Great Britain
Preceded by Sir Henry Seymour; George Clarke	Member of Parliament for East Looe; 1708–1710; With: Sir Henry Seymour	Succeeded by Sir Henry Seymour; Thomas Smith
Baronetage of England
Preceded by John Trelawny	Baronet (of Trelawny); 1756–1762	Succeeded by William Trelawny
