= William Trumbull =

English diplomat and politician (1639–1716)

The Right Honourable Sir William Trumbull
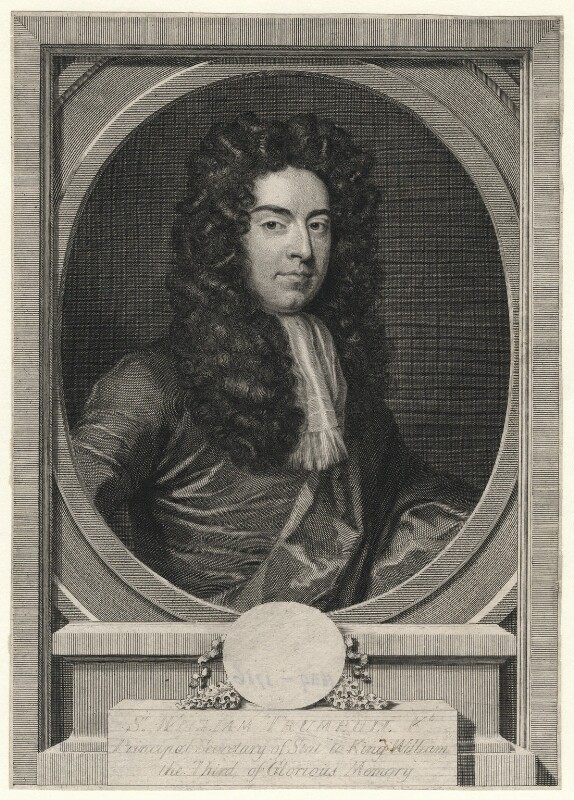
- A 1724 mezzotint of Trumbull
- Born: 8 September 1639; Easthampstead Park, Berkshire
- Died: 14 December 1716 (aged 77); Easthampstead Park, Berkshire
- Occupations: Diplomat, politician

Sir William Trumbull, PC (8 September 1639 – 14 December 1716) was an English diplomat and politician who was a member of the First Whig Junto.

== Early life ==
Trumbull was born at Easthampstead Park in Berkshire and baptised on 11 September 1639. He was the son and heir of William Trumbull (1594–1668) and grandson of William Trumbull, the Jacobean period diplomat. His mother was Elizabeth Weckerlin (c. 1619 – 11 July 1652), only daughter of George Rudolph Weckerlin, Latin Secretary to Charles I, King of England. He received his early instruction in Latin and French from his maternal grandfather, and was sent in 1649 to Wokingham School. He matriculated from St John's College, Oxford on 5 April 1655, being entered as a gentleman-commoner under the Rev. Thomas Wyatt, and in 1657 was elected to a fellowship at All Souls' College, Oxford, which he probably retained until his marriage in 1670. In the same year he was entered at the Middle Temple. He graduated Bachelor of Civil Law on 12 October 1659. After completing his degree, he visited France and Italy, where he met several distinguished persons, such as Lords Sunderland and Godolphin, Algernon Sidney and Henry Compton. In 1664 and 1665 he travelled in company with Sir Christopher Wren and Edward Browne. In 1666, Trumbull returned to college and in 1667 he was awarded a Doctorate of Civil Law.

== Professional life ==
He was admitted an advocate in Doctors' Commons in London on 28 April 1668 and began practising in the ecclesiastical and admiralty courts. He would remain for the next 15 years, becoming a lawyer of high repute. Through the offices of his father-in-law, Sir Charles Cotterell, he was appointed chancellor of the diocese of Rochester in 1671 by its bishop, John Dolben, the future archbishop of York, and benefited much from 'the friendship and patronage of that great and good man'.

In 1683 he was appointed Judge Advocate of the Fleet by Lord Dartmouth, George Legge, in an expedition to evacuate the British colony at Tangier, where he was to act as commissioner for settling the leases of the houses between the King and the inhabitants. Samuel Pepys, who was also on the expedition, was unimpressed – "Strange to see how surprised and troubled Dr. Trumbull shows himself at this new work put on him of a judge-advocate; how he cons over the law-martial and what weak questions he asks me about it." Later Pepys calls him "a man of the meanest mind as to courage that ever was born."

In 1684, Charles II considered Trumbull as a possible Secretary of State, but he was eventually offered the office of Secretary of War in Ireland, which he turned down. Nevertheless, he was knighted on 21 November 1684, and on 1 February 1685 was made Clerk of the Deliveries of the Ordnance. Through the favour of the Trelawny family, he entered Parliament as MP for the Cornish borough of East Looe 1685–1687.

Charles II died a few days later and Trumbull had to relinquish the clerkship when he was sent by James II, against his own wishes, as envoy extraordinary to France. With King James a declared papist and French King Louis XIV persecuting his Protestant subjects, Trumbull, a devout Anglican, was an odd choice for the post, being a zealous opponent of Roman Catholicism, and did much to benefit the condition of the English Protestants in France after Edict of Fontainebleau. In 1686 he was recalled from Paris, and on 15 October was nominated by the king to be appointed Ambassador at Constantinople, where he arrived on 17 August 1687. He remained ambassador until 31 July 1691 when he departed Turkey. Sir William was a Governor of the Hudson's Bay Company from 1696 to 1700 and the Turkey Company from 1696 to 1709.

On 3 May 1694 he was appointed a Commissioner of the Treasury, and a year later was made a Privy Counsellor and appointed Secretary of State for the Northern Department. However, he was unhappy in the post, and resigned it on 2 December 1697. He then retired from public life.

Trumbull was a friend of both John Dryden and Alexander Pope. Dryden records, in the postscript to his translation of Virgil, that "if the last Aeneid shine amongst its fellows, it is owing to the commands of Sir William Trumbull, who recommended it as his favourite to my care." It was Trumbull who, admiring Pope's translation of the "Epistle of Sarpedon" from the Iliad urged him to translate the whole of Homer's works, and Pope's "Spring" was dedicated to him.

== Family life ==
In 1670, Trumbull married Elizabeth, daughter of Sir Charles Cotterell, Master of the Ceremonies; she died in 1704, they having had no children. In Scotland in October 1706, he married Judith (died 1724), daughter of Henry Alexander, the 4th Earl of Stirling. They had two children, Judith (1707–1708) and William (1708–1760).

Trumbull died on 14 December 1716. He was buried on 21 December at Easthampstead church. His funerary monument in the south transept proclaims that 'he maintained the character of an able statesman'.

His son William had an only daughter, who became the wife of the Hon. Martin Sandys, second son of Samuel Sandys, 1st Baron Sandys. She was thus the ancestress of the later marquesses of Downshire.

== Letters ==
Many of Trumbull's letters are in the British Library and in the Record Office, London. Trumbull was on friendly terms with Pierre Bayle and was a mentor to the young Henry St. John, later Viscount Bolingbroke, who may have met his great friend, Pope, through Trumbull.

Parliament of England
Preceded by John Kendall; Sir Jonathan Trelawny	Member of Parliament for East Looe; 1685–1687; With: Charles Trelawny	Succeeded by Henry Trelawny; Charles Trelawny
Preceded by Heneage Finch; Sir Thomas Clarges	Member of Parliament for Oxford University; 1695–1698; With: Heneage Finch	Succeeded by Sir Christopher Musgrave; Sir William Glynne
Diplomatic posts
Preceded by John Churchill, Baron Churchill	English Ambassador to France; 1685–1686	Succeeded by Bevil Skelton
Preceded by Lord Chandos	English Ambassador to the Ottoman Empire; 1687–1691	Succeeded by Sir William Hussey
Political offices
Preceded by Thomas Gardiner	Clerk of the Deliveries of the Ordnance; 1685	Succeeded by Philip Musgrave
Preceded by The Duke of Shrewsbury	Secretary of State for the Northern Department; 1695–1697	Succeeded by James Vernon
