= East Looe (constituency) =

Former parliamentary constituency in the United Kingdom

- Former borough constituency for the House of Commons
- County: Cornwall
- Major settlements: East Looe

1571–1832
- Seats: Two
- Replaced by: East Cornwall

East Looe was a parliamentary borough represented in the House of Commons of England from 1571 to 1707, in the House of Commons of Great Britain from 1707 to 1800, and finally in the House of Commons of the United Kingdom from 1801 until its abolition in 1832. It elected two Members of Parliament (MP) by the bloc vote system of election. It was disenfranchised in the Reform Act 1832.

== History ==
The borough consisted of the town of East Looe in Cornwall, connected by bridge across the River Looe to West Looe, which was also a parliamentary borough. From the reign of Edward VI, East Looe and West Looe were jointly a borough, returning two members of Parliament; however, under Queen Elizabeth the two towns were separated, and each thereafter returned two members except between 1654 and 1658, when they were once again represented jointly as East Looe and West Looe, by one member of the First and Second Protectorate Parliaments.

The right of election was in Mayor and members of the corporation, together with a number of freemen of the borough. Namier and Brooke estimated that there were about fifty voters in this constituency in the second half of the eighteenth century. It is estimated that by 1800 there were still about fifty electors, and in 1831 the number of eligible voters was 38 while the population of the borough was 865.

In practice, this meant that the power to choose the MPs was in the hands of the local landowner or "proprietor", making East Looe (like West Looe) one of the most notorious of the rotten boroughs. The borough was long controlled by the Trelawny family of the nearby manor of Trelawny in the parish of Pelynt. For many years at the time of the Reform Act, East Looe had been controlled by the Buller family of Morval (which also controlled West Looe and Saltash), and many members of the family sat for the borough in the House of Commons.

After the Reform Act 1832 disenfranchised the borough, it reverted to being represented as part of the county constituency covering its area. Cornwall was divided into two divisions in 1832, East Cornwall (with its place of election at Bodmin) and West Cornwall (which voted at Truro). East Looe was located in East Cornwall.

== Members of Parliament ==
=== 1571–1629 ===
Parliament	First member	Second member
Parliament of 1571	John Wolley	Edward Cordel
Parliament of 1572–1583	Thomas Stone	Thomas West
Parliament of 1584–1585	Richard Spencer	Anthony Rous
Parliament of 1586–1587	Abraham Hartwell	Edward Trelawny
Parliament of 1588–1589	Anthony Everard	Sir Robert Jermyn
Parliament of 1593	William Hampden	Gregory Downhall
Parliament of 1597–1598	Ambrose Bellot	Robert Gawdy
Parliament of 1601	John Hanham	Robert Yardley
Parliament of 1604–1611	Sir Robert Phelips	Sir John Parker
Addled Parliament (1614)	George Chudleigh	Sir Reginald Mohun
Parliament of 1621–1622	Sir John Walter	Sir Jerome Horsey
Happy Parliament (1624–1625)	Sir John Walter	Bartholomew Specot
Useless Parliament (1625)	Sir James Bagge	Sir John Trevor
Parliament of 1625–1626	Sir James Bagge	John Chudleigh
Parliament of 1628–1629	William Murray	Paul Specot
No Parliament summoned 1629–1640

=== 1640–1832 ===
Year	First member	First party	Second member	Second party
April 1640	William Scawen		William Code	
November 1640	Thomas Lower	Royalist	Francis Buller	Parliamentarian
January 1644	Lower disabled to sit – seat vacant		Francis Buller	Parliamentarian
1647	John Moyle		Francis Buller	Parliamentarian
December 1648	John Moyle		Buller excluded in Pride's Purge – seat vacant	
1653	East Looe was unrepresented in the Barebones Parliament			
1654	Major John Blackmore		In the First and Second Parliaments of the Protectorate, one MP was elected jointly for East Looe and West Looe	
1656	John Buller		In the First and Second Parliaments of the Protectorate, one MP was elected jointly for East Looe and West Looe	
January 1659	John Buller		John Kendall	
May 1659	Not represented in the restored Rump			
1660	Henry Seymour		Jonathan Trelawny	
1661	Henry Seymour		Robert Atkyns	
1673	Henry Seymour		Walter Langdon	
1677	Henry Seymour		Charles Osborne	
1679	Henry Seymour		Sir Jonathan Trelawny	
1681	John Kendall		Sir Jonathan Trelawny	
1685	Charles Trelawny	Tory	Sir William Trumbull	Whig
1689	Charles Trelawny	Tory	Henry Trelawny	
1699	Sir Henry Seymour		Henry Trelawny	
1701	Sir Henry Seymour		Francis Godolphin	
February 1702	Sir Henry Seymour		George Courtenay	
July 1702	Sir Henry Seymour		Sir John Pole	
1705	Sir Henry Seymour		George Clarke	
1708	Sir Henry Seymour		Harry Trelawny	
1710	Sir Henry Seymour		Thomas Smith	
1713	Sir Charles Hedges	Tory	Edward Jennings	
1715	John Smith	Whig	Sir James Bateman	
1718	John Smith	Whig	Horatio Walpole	
1722	John Smith	Whig	William Lowndes	
January 1724	Viscount Malpas	Whig	William Lowndes	
February 1724	Viscount Malpas	Whig	Sir Henry Hoghton	
1727	Charles Longueville		Sir John Trelawny	
1734	Charles Longueville		Edward Trelawny	
1735	Charles Longueville		Samuel Holden	
1740	Charles Longueville		Henry Legge	Whig
1741	Francis Gashry	Whig	James Buller	Tory
1747	Francis Gashry	Whig	John Buller	
1762	The Viscount Palmerston		John Buller	
1768	Richard Hussey		John Buller	
1770	Richard Leigh		John Buller	
1772	John Purling		John Buller	
1774	Sir Charles Whitworth		John Buller	
January 1775	Thomas Graves		John Buller	
June 1775	William Graves		John Buller	
1783	John Hamilton	Tory	John Buller	
1784	William Graves		John Buller	
May 1786	Alexander Irvine	Tory	John Buller	
September 1786	Alexander Irvine	Tory	Richard Grosvenor	Tory
1788	Alexander Irvine	Tory	Viscount Belgrave	Tory
February 1790	The Earl of Carysfort	Tory	Viscount Belgrave	Tory
June 1790	Robert Wood	Tory	Hon. William Wellesley-Pole	Tory
1795	Robert Wood	Tory	Charles Arbuthnot	Tory
1796	John Buller	Tory	William Graves	Tory
1798	John Buller	Tory	Frederick William Buller	Tory
May 1799	John Smith	Tory	Frederick William Buller	Tory
July 1799	Sir John Mitford	Tory	Frederick William Buller	Tory
February 1802	James Buller	Tory	Frederick William Buller	Tory
July 1802	Sir Edward Buller	Tory	John Buller	Tory
1807	Sir Edward Buller	Tory	David Vanderheyden	Tory
1816	Sir Edward Buller	Tory	Thomas Potter Macqueen	Tory
1820	George Watson-Taylor	Tory	Thomas Potter Macqueen	Tory
March 1826	Lord Perceval	Tory	Thomas Potter Macqueen	Tory
June 1826	William Lascelles	Tory	James Drummond Buller-Elphinstone	Tory
1829	William Lascelles	Tory	Henry Thomas Hope	Tory
1830	Thomas Arthur Kemmis	Tory	Henry Thomas Hope	Tory
1832	Constituency abolished			

== See also ==
- West Looe (UK Parliament constituency)
- MPs elected in the British general election, 1754
- Unreformed House of Commons
