= Edward Trelawny =

Edward Trelawny may refer to:

- Edward John Trelawny (1792–1881), biographer, novelist and adventurer
- Edward Trelawny (colonial administrator) (1699–1754), British governor of Jamaica, 1738–1752
