= Sir John Trelawny, 1st Baronet =

Cornish baronet and soldier

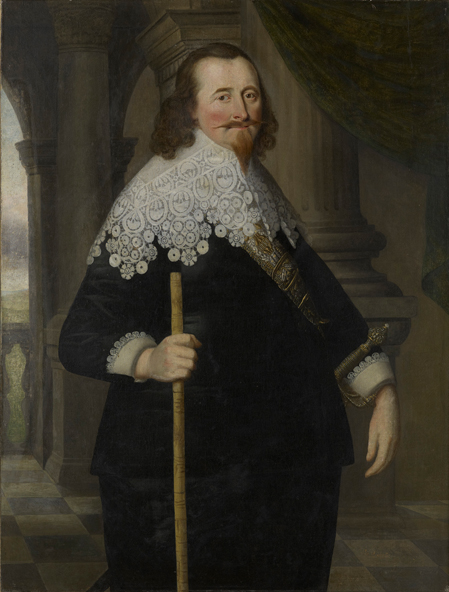
Sir John Trelawny, 1st Baronet, portrait c. 1630

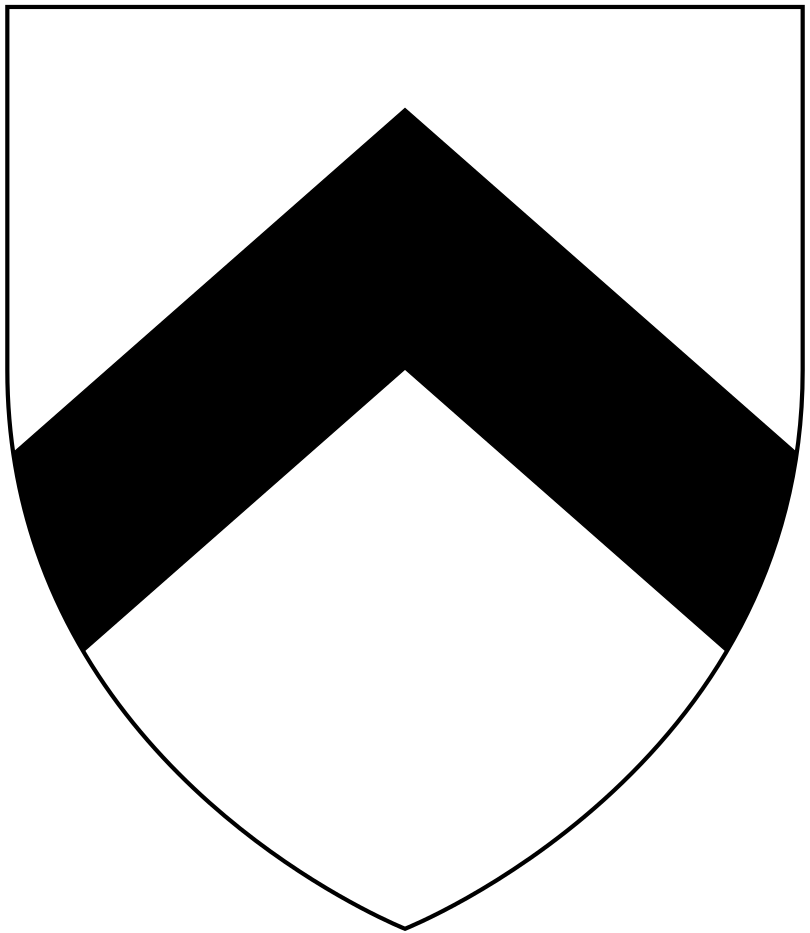
Arms of Trelawny: Argent, a chevron sable

Sir John Trelawny, 1st Baronet (24 April 1592 – 16 February 1664) was a Cornish baronet and soldier from Trelawne, Cornwall. He was High Sheriff of Cornwall. A Royalist Member of Parliament, he fought for Charles I in the English Civil War.

== Origins ==
John Trelawny was born in Hall, near Fowey in Cornwall on 24 April 1592, and baptised in Fowey on 7 May. He was the eldest son of Jonathan Trelawny and Elizabeth Killigrew. He studied at Merton College, Oxford where he matriculated 23 October 1607.

He succeeded his father in 1604 to the Trelawne manor his father had bought from the crown in 1600.

== Parliament ==
In 1628, Trelawny became involved in the dispute between Charles I and leading members of Parliament which eventually led to the English Civil War. The King was anxious to influence the election of MPs so as to secure a more pliable Parliament, and in Cornwall efforts on his behalf were being directed by one James Bagg, acting in concert with the Duke of Buckingham. Two of the King's most implacable opponents, William Coryton and Sir John Eliot, had announced their intention of standing for election as knights of the shire for Cornwall, and Bagg arranged for a caucus of influential Cornish magistrates to mobilise against them. They not only used the official posts to promote alternative candidates and attempted to instruct the High Sheriff (Trelawny himself was High Sheriff of Cornwall in 1630) who he should return as elected, but they wrote open letters to the freeholders of the county appealing that they should not elect Coryton or Eliot, and to Eliot and Coryton themselves, warning them against persisting with their candidacy. These letters were signed by all the magistrates concerned, of whom Trelawny was one.

The campaign was unavailing, and Eliot and Coryton were duly elected. But such means of campaigning were not then considered legitimate, and when Parliament met the House of Commons issued summonses to all those who had signed the letters, demanding that they appear at the bar of the House and explain themselves. When they failed to attend, Trelawny and three of the others were arrested and brought to London. After hearing counsel's arguments on both sides, the House committed Trelawny and another offender, Walter Langdon, to the Tower of London, both for the original offence and for their contempt of Parliament in failing to answer the summons.

However, Bagg and Buckingham had been working behind the scenes to ensure that their adherents should benefit rather than suffer for their loyalty to the King. They had already secured a peerage for Trelawny's brother-in-law John Mohun, who had also been summoned by the Commons as one of the candidates in whose favour the controversial letters had been written. By agreeing, the King was simultaneously demonstrating to the Commons his contempt for their sensibilities and removing Mohun from their jurisdiction (since they could not arrest a peer). Trelawny and Langdon had petitioned the King for their release from the Tower, but he was not willing directly to defy the privileges of the Commons, and took no action while the House was sitting. However, Bagg had also privately asked as a special favour that Trelawny should be made a baronet. Within an hour of Parliament being prorogued at the end of the month, the King had signed a warrant to the governor of the Tower ordering that Trelawny and Langdon should be released, and committing the Crown to paying the costs of their imprisonment; and, four days later, on 1 July 1628, not only was a baronetcy bestowed on Trelawny but the fees that were ordinarily payable on such an occasion were remitted.

== Civil War ==
Sir John distinguished himself on the Royalist side in the English Civil War fighting alongside Sir Ralph Hopton and Sir Reginald Mohun of Boconnoc, his friend and father-in-law.

== Marriage and progeny ==
He married Elizabeth Mohun (born 1593), the daughter of Sir Reginald Mohun and Phillipa Hele, in or before 1617. The couple had thirteen children:

- Sir Jonathan Trelawny, 2nd Baronet (c.1623–1681)
- John Trelawny (c.1625–82), MP for Looe
- Edward Trelawny
- Francis Trelawny, married Margaret Seymour, youngest daughter of Sir Edward Seymour, 2nd Baronet
- Reginald Trelawny
- Elizabeth Trelawny, married Thomas Lower
- Anne Trelawny (died 1638), married John Vivian of Trewan Hall
- Cordelia Trelawney (æt 1 year in 1620) (See Visitations of Cornwall page 577 which should be page 477)
- Margaret Trelawny, married Amos Fulford, younger son of Sir Francis Fulford
- Phillippa Trelawny
- Bridget Trelawny, married a Mr John Lee
- Mary Trelawny, married Rev. Greensworth (Visitations calls him Grimsworth)
- Penelope Trelawny, married Thomas Maynard
- Dorothy Trelawny, married William Mohun

Elizabeth died at some date after January 1639, and Sir John married Douglas (1586–1660), the daughter of Tristram Gorges and widow of Sir William Courtenay. Sir John himself died, and was buried at Pelynt on 16 February 1664.

== See also ==
- Cornwall in the English Civil War

Baronetage of England
New creation	Baronet (of Trelawny); 1628–1664	Succeeded by Jonathan Trelawny
