= Salusbury-Trelawny baronets =

Title in the Baronetage of England

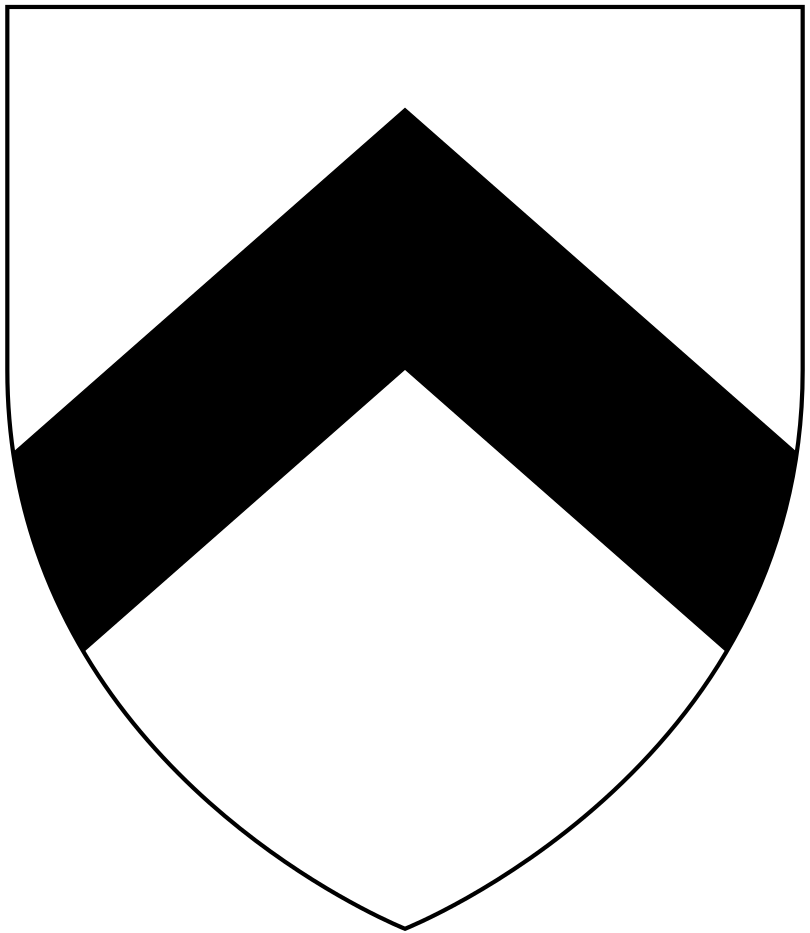
Arms of Trelawny: Argent, a chevron sable

The Trelawny, later Salusbury-Trelawny Baronetcy, of Trelawny in the County of Cornwall, is a title in the Baronetage of England. It was created on 1 July 1628 for John Trelawny of Trelawny in the parish of Pelynt in Cornwall. The family derived much of their political power from their patronage of the nearby pocket borough of East Looe. The second Baronet sat as Member of Parliament for East Looe, Cornwall and Liskeard. The third Baronet was a clergyman and one of the Seven Bishops imprisoned by James II. The fourth Baronet represented West Looe, Liskeard and East Looe in the House of Commons. The fifth Baronet was Member of Parliament for East Looe. The sixth Baronet sat as Member of Parliament for West Looe and served as Governor of Jamaica. The eighth Baronet was Member of Parliament for East Cornwall 1832–1837 and Lord-Lieutenant of Cornwall. In 1802 he assumed the additional surname of Salusbury. The ninth Baronet represented Tavistock and East Cornwall in Parliament.

John Trelawny, Charles Trelawny and Henry Trelawny, sons of the second Baronet and brothers of the third Baronet, all gained distinction in their own right. Edward Trelawny, younger son of Bishop Trelawny (3rd Bt), served as Governor of Jamaica 1738-52.

== Trelawny, later Salusbury-Trelawny baronets, of Trelawny (1628) ==
- Sir John Trelawny, 1st Baronet (1592–1664)
- Sir Jonathan Trelawny, 2nd Baronet (c. 1623–1681)
- Sir Jonathan Trelawny, 3rd Baronet (1650–1721)
- Sir John Trelawny, 4th Baronet (1691–1756)
- Sir Harry Trelawny, 5th Baronet (1687–1762)
- Sir William Trelawny, 6th Baronet (c. 1722–1772)
- Sir Harry Trelawny, 7th Baronet (1756–1834)
- Sir William Lewis Salusbury-Trelawny, 8th Baronet (1781–1856)
- Sir John Salusbury Salusbury-Trelawny, 9th Baronet (1816–1885)
- Sir William Lewis Salusbury-Trelawny, 10th Baronet (1844–1917)
- Sir John William Salusbury-Trelawny, 11th Baronet (1869–1944)
- Sir John William Robin Maurice Salusbury-Trelawny, 12th Baronet (1908–1956)
- Sir John Barry Salusbury-Trelawny, 13th Baronet (1934–2009)
- Sir John William Richard Salusbury-Trelawny, 14th Baronet (born 1960)
  - The heir apparent to the baronetcy is the son of the 14th baronet, Harry John Salusbury-Trelawny (born 1982).

Sir Harry Trelawny, 7th Baronet (1756–1834) converted to Catholicism; and, in 1830, at the age of 74, was ordained priest by Cardinal Odescalchi, Vicar of Pope Gregory XVI. He died at Laveno, Lago Maggiore, Italy, on 25 February 1834.

== See also ==
- Trelawny Island

== Sources ==
- Kidd, Charles & Williamson, David (editors). Debrett's Peerage and Baronetage (1990 edition). New York: St Martin's Press, 1990
