= Henry Seymour (Langley) =

English courtier

Henry Seymour of Langley (1612 – 9 March 1686), was an English courtier who supported the Royalist cause in the English Civil War and after the Restoration sat in the House of Commons from 1660 to 1681.

== Biography ==
Seymour was the second son of Sir Edward Seymour, and Dorothy, daughter of Sir Henry Killigrew of Lothbury, Cornwall. He was a Page of Honour to Queen Henrietta Maria and made Groom of the Bedchamber to Charles, Prince of Wales in 1638.

Upon the outbreak of the English Civil War Seymour joined the Royalist army, serving under his kinsman William, Marquess of Hertford. He accompanied the Marquess into Somerset and was at Battle of Sherburn when with only two troops of horse (cavalry) and 400-foot, the Royalists withstood the whole force of the William, Earl of Bedford, consisting of above 7,000-foot supported by horse and artillery. During this engagement Hertford sent Bedford a challenge which was carried by Seymour. Attaching himself to Prince Charles, he carried the message from him to the Earl of Warwick in August 1648 concerning the surrender of the fleet.

When the Royalist cause was lost, Seymour accompanied Charles, Prince of Wales into exile and was commissioned to carry the last messages between the Prince and his father King Charles I, which he delivered on 27 January 1649 (just three days before the Kings execution, and the day the verdict was delivered). It is said on hearing the verdict he broke down, and kissed the king, clasped his legs, and moaning aloud. To him the king imparted his last letter to the prince.

He was sent by Charles II from Jersey to Ireland in September 1649. He accompanied Charles to Scotland in 1650, was voted away from the king's person by the Scottish committee, and left at Aberdeen after the defeat at Dunbar. In 1651 he is described as of Charles's bedchamber at Paris, and was frequently despatched by the king to his friends in England. In January 1654 he collected £1,920 for Charles in England, and received a pass on his return to France from the Lord Protector Oliver Cromwell. He represented that he was solely engaged in his private affairs. He almost immediately returned to England, and would appear to have been arrested in June 1654. He was not released until the end of May 1657, and then upon hard terms.

At the Restoration in 1660 he continued in his office (until 1685) as Groom of the Bedchamber to Charles, now King Charles II, and was appointed Comptroller of Customs and Clerk of the Hanaper. In 1660 he was also elected the MP for East Looe to the Convention Parliament and then to the Cavalier Parliament until 1681.

In 1666, Seymour leased the estate of Langley, Buckinghamshire, which he purchased in 1669, receiving with it the manor of Langley. He retired to Langley and died on 9 March 1686 aged 74, leaving his estate to his son Sir Henry Seymour. During his retirement Seymour was known to be honourable, affable, generous and charitable. He endowed, In his lifetime, an alms house, at Langley for six poor elderly people; and by his last will and testament, gave £400 to put out poor boys apprentices, beside other charitable legacies to specific persons.

== Family ==
Seymour married twice. His first marriage was to Elizabeth (died 1671), daughter of Sir Join Killigrew, and widow of William Basset, they had no children. He married secondly Ursula, daughter of Sir Robert Austen and widow of George Stowel. They had two children:

- a daughter.
- Henry (1674–1714), was created a baronet at the age of seven (while his father still lived) by Charles II 4 July 1681. Later in life for many years he was a member of Parliament.

== Notes ==
Parliament of England
Not represented in the Rump	Member of Parliament for East Looe; 1660–1681; With: Sir Jonathan Trelawny 1660–1661, 1679–1681; Robert Atkyns 1661–1673; Walter Langdon 1673–1677; Charles Osborne 1677–1679	Succeeded by Sir Jonathan Trelawny; John Kendall
