= Sir Harry Trelawny, 7th Baronet =

Sir Harry Trelawny, 7th Baronet (1756–1834) was an English Protestant preacher and convert to Roman Catholicism, nephew of General Harry Trelawny.

Sir Harry (Henry) Trelawny of Trelawne was a Cornish baronet of historic title. As a young man he had been ordained as a Congregational minister. Later he had been ordained afresh as an Anglican clergyman, then in middle age became a Catholic. He had a wife and six grown-up children.

Trelawny was born in 1756 at St Budeaux near Plymouth. His great-grandfather's brother Sir Jonathan Trelawny was one of the seven bishops sent to the Tower for defying James II's order to proclaim the Declaration of Indulgence.

Trelawny was ordained a Catholic priest in Rome on Whitsunday, 1830 and spent his remaining years trying to arrange for the Passionists or the Rosminians to settle priests at Trelawne to found a permanent mission there. There were endless delays, and the project was still in the air when Trelawny died, aged 77, on February 25, 1834. He lies buried at Laveno, near Lake Maggiore, in a tomb inscribed with lines from St. Augustine.

Baronetage of England
Preceded by William Trelawny	Baronet (of Trelawny); 1772–1834	Succeeded by William Salusbury-Trelawny
