= Samuel Holden =

Samuel Holden (1675–1740) was an English merchant, politician, and nonconformist activist.

== Life ==
The son of Joseph Holden by his second wife Priscilla Watt, he was employed when still young by the Russia Company at Riga. He became a successful merchant in London, a director of the Bank of England (1720–27 and 1731–40), its Deputy Governor (1727–29) and its Governor (1729–31).

A Dissenter, Holden chaired from 1732 a committee for the repeal of the Corporation Act and other Test Acts. He entered Parliament as Member for East Looe in 1735. Undertakings by Sir Robert Walpole not to obstruct actively moves for repeal turned out to be largely irrelevant when Holden tried to introduce legislation in the area. He resigned from the committee in 1736, forced out in favour of Benjamin Avery.

He married Jane Whitehalgh of the Whitehaugh, Instones, Staffordshire, with whom he had a son and 3 daughters. In 1744 his daughter and co-heir Mary married John Jolliffe, the MP for Petersfield.

== Legacy ==
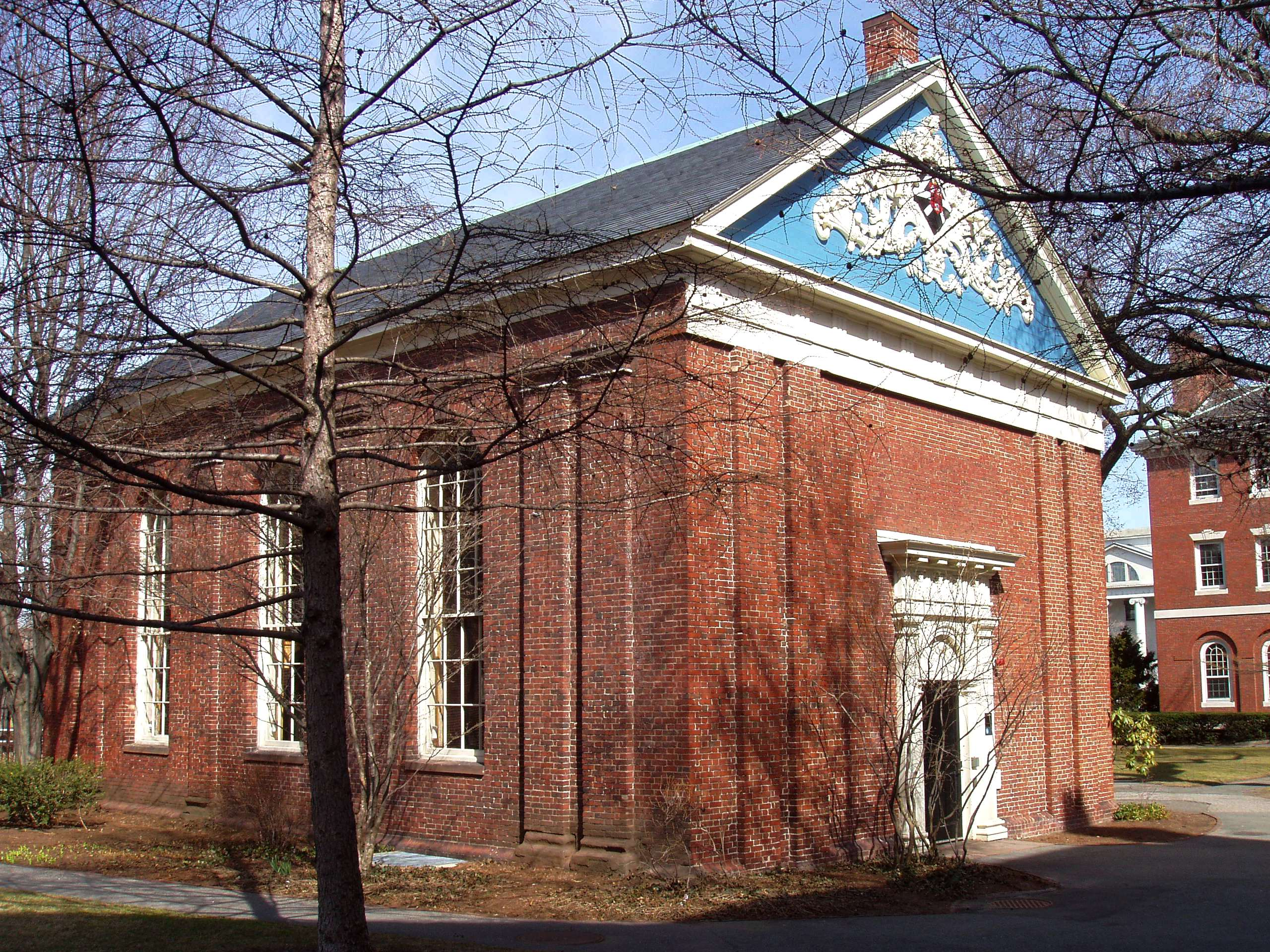
Holden Chapel in Harvard Yard, named for Samuel Holden

Holden left £60,000 on his death in 1740. Holden Chapel at Harvard College was constructed with some of this money.

== Notes ==
Parliament of Great Britain
Preceded by Charles Longueville; Edward Trelawny	Member of Parliament for East Looe; 1735–1740; With: Charles Longueville	Succeeded by Charles Longueville; Henry Legge
