= East Looe and West Looe (constituency) =

East Looe and West Looe was a short-lived parliamentary borough represented in the First and Second Parliament of the Protectorate between 1654 and 1658. The borough had been made by combining the boroughs of East Looe and West Looe, which were reinstated in the Third Protectorate Parliament in 1659. The sole MP for the borough was John Buller.
