= Sir John Trelawny, 4th Baronet =

Cornish politician

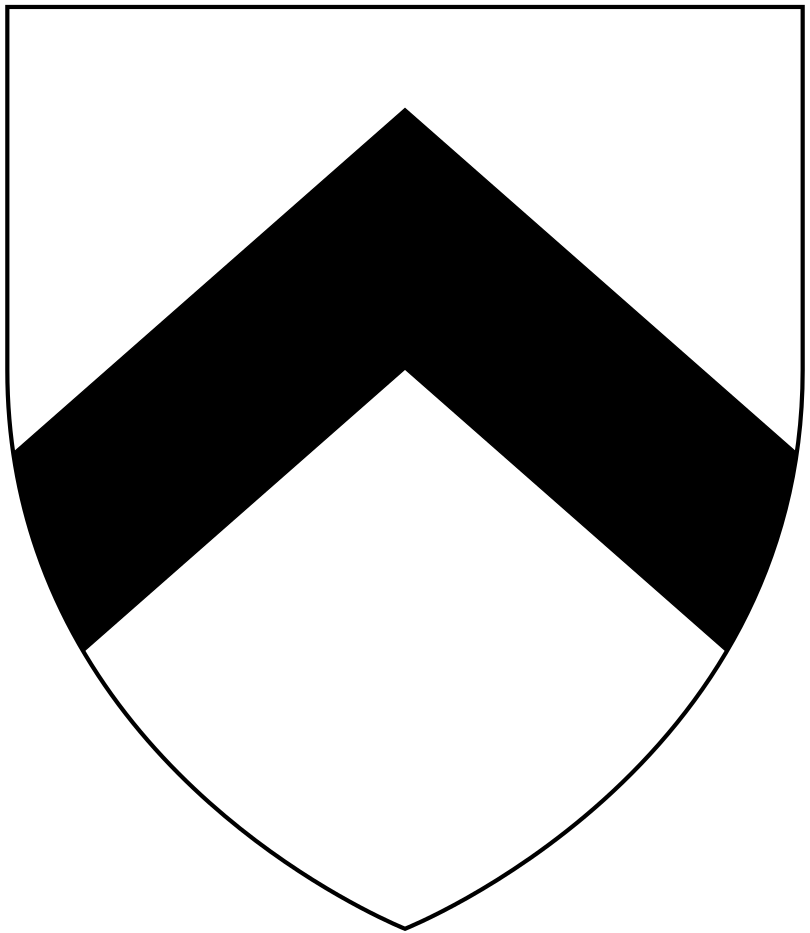
Arms of Trelawny: Argent, a chevron sable

Sir John Trelawny, 4th Baronet (26 July 1691 – 2 February 1756), of Trelawne in Cornwall, was a Cornish politician who sat in the House of Commons from 1713 to 1734. Trelawny was the eldest son of Sir Jonathan Trelawny, 3rd Baronet and his wife Rebecca Hele, daughter of Thomas Hele of Bascombe, Devon. His father was Bishop of Bristol, Bishop of Exeter and Bishop of Winchester. He matriculated at Christ Church, Oxford on 26 January 1708. He married Agnes Blackwood daughter of Thomas Blackwood of Scotland. He succeeded his father in the baronetcy on 19 July 1721.

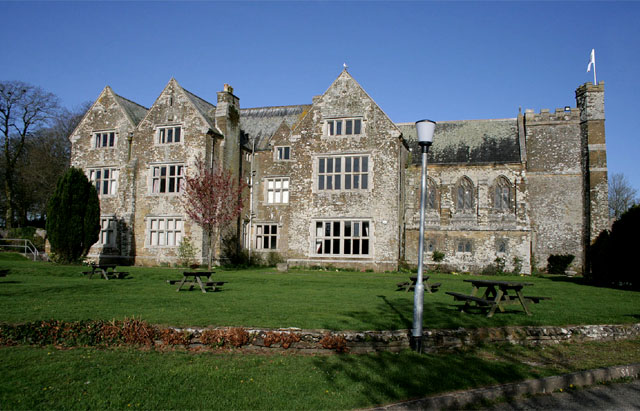
Trelawne House

The Trelawny family had extensive political interest in Cornwall. Trelawny entered Parliament at a by-election on 20 April 1713 as Member of Parliament for West Looe, a family seat, and was returned at the 1713 general election soon after. He was appointed Groom of the bedchamber to the Prince of Wales in 1714. In 1715 he was returned unopposed as MP for Liskeard. He was appointed Recorder of East Looe in about 1721 and retained the position until 1734. He was returned unopposed as MP for West Looe again in 1722 and then for East Looe at the 1727 general election. He did not stand in 1734.

Trelawny had no children, and his younger brother, Edward Trelawny, Governor of Jamaica, died before him. He was therefore succeeded in the baronetcy by his cousin, Harry.

Parliament of Great Britain
Preceded by Sir Charles Hedges; Arthur Maynwaring	Member of Parliament for West Looe; 1713–1715; With: Sir Charles Hedges 1713; Sir Charles Wager 1713–1715	Succeeded by George Delaval; Thomas Maynard
Preceded by Philip Rashleigh; William Bridges	Member of Parliament for Liskeard; 1715–1722; With: Philip Rashleigh	Succeeded by Edward Eliot; John Lansdell
Preceded by George Delaval; Thomas Maynard	Member of Parliament for West Looe; 1722–1727; With: George Delaval 1722–1723; Edward Trelawny 1724–1727	Succeeded by Edward Trelawny; John Willes
Preceded by Viscount Malpas; Sir Henry Hoghton	Member of Parliament for East Looe; 1727–1734; With: Charles Longueville	Succeeded by Charles Longueville; Edward Trelawny
Honorary titles
Preceded by Charles Trelawny	Vice-Admiral of South Cornwall; 1710–1715	Merged with North Cornwall
Preceded by North and South Cornwall merged	Vice-Admiral of Cornwall; 1715–1755	Succeeded by Edward Boscawen
Baronetage of England
Preceded by Jonathan Trelawny	Baronet (of Trelawny); 1721–1756	Succeeded by Harry Trelawny
