= List of vice-admirals of Cornwall =

This is a list of people who have served as Vice-Admiral of Cornwall. This vice-admiralty jurisdiction was divided into North and South Cornwall between 1601 and 1715, with a separate vice-admiral for each; in addition, two members of the Godolphin family were vice-admirals of the Isles of Scilly between 1570 and 1638. The Vice-Admiral of Cornwall is an office of the Duchy of Cornwall, and is also sometimes referred to as the Lord High Admiral of Cornwall.

== Vice-admirals of Cornwall (1559–1601) ==
- Edward Hastings, 1st Baron Hastings of Loughborough 1559
- William Lower 1559–1577
- Ambrose Digby bef. 1577–1578 (joint in 1577)
- John Arundell 1578–1582
- vacant
- John Killigrew 1587–1588
- Sir Francis Godolphin 1588
- John Killigrew 1588–1589
- vacant
- Thomas Payne 1590–1599
- Charles Trevanion 1599–1601

== Vice-admirals of North Cornwall (1601–1715) ==
- William Roscarrock 1601–1621
- vacant
- Francis Bassett 1623–1645
- John Basset 1644–1645 (joint)
- Thomas Upton 1645
- John Trefusis 1645–1647 (Parliamentary)
- Edward Herle 1647–1649 (Parliamentary)
- vacant
- Richard Heyworth 1650–? (Parliamentary)
- John Basset 1660–1661
- Jonathan Trelawny 1661–1670
- Sir John Godolphin 1670–1679
- Sir Joseph Tredenham 1679–1686
- Sir John Molesworth, 2nd Baronet 1686–1715

== Vice-admirals of South Cornwall (1601–1715) ==
- Hannibal Vyvyan 1601–1607
- Francis Vyvyan 1607–1608
- vacant
- Nicholas Burton 1612–1613
- vacant
- Sir James Bagg 1622–1638
- Sir Nicholas Slanning 1638–1643
- Sir Charles Trevanion 1643–1645 (Royalist)
- John St Aubyn 1644–1649 (Parliamentary)
- Anthony Rous 1649–1660 (Parliamentary)
- John St Aubyn 1660 (Parliamentary)
- Sir William Godolphin 1660–1663
- Francis Godolphin 1664-1671
- Sir Jonathan Trelawny, 2nd Baronet 1671–1675
- John Trelawny 1675–1682
- Sir Jonathan Trelawny, 3rd Baronet 1682–1693
- Henry Trelawny 1693–1702
- Charles Trelawny 1702–1710
- Sir John Trelawny, 4th Baronet 1710–1715

== Vice-admirals of the Isles of Scilly (1570–1638) ==
- Francis Godolphin (senior) 1570–1606?
- vacant
- Francis Godolphin (junior) bef. 1630–1638

== Vice-admirals of Cornwall (1715–1917) ==
- Sir John Trelawny, 4th Baronet 1715–1755
- Edward Boscawen 1755–1761
- Hugh Boscawen, 2nd Viscount Falmouth 1761–1782
- George Edgcumbe, 1st Earl of Mount Edgcumbe 1782–1795
- Richard Edgcumbe, 2nd Earl of Mount Edgcumbe 1795–1839
- Francis Seymour-Conway, 3rd Marquess of Hertford 1839-1842
- vacant
- William Edgcumbe, 4th Earl of Mount Edgcumbe 1897–1917
