= Sir William Trelawny, 6th Baronet =

British politician

Sir William Trelawny Bt
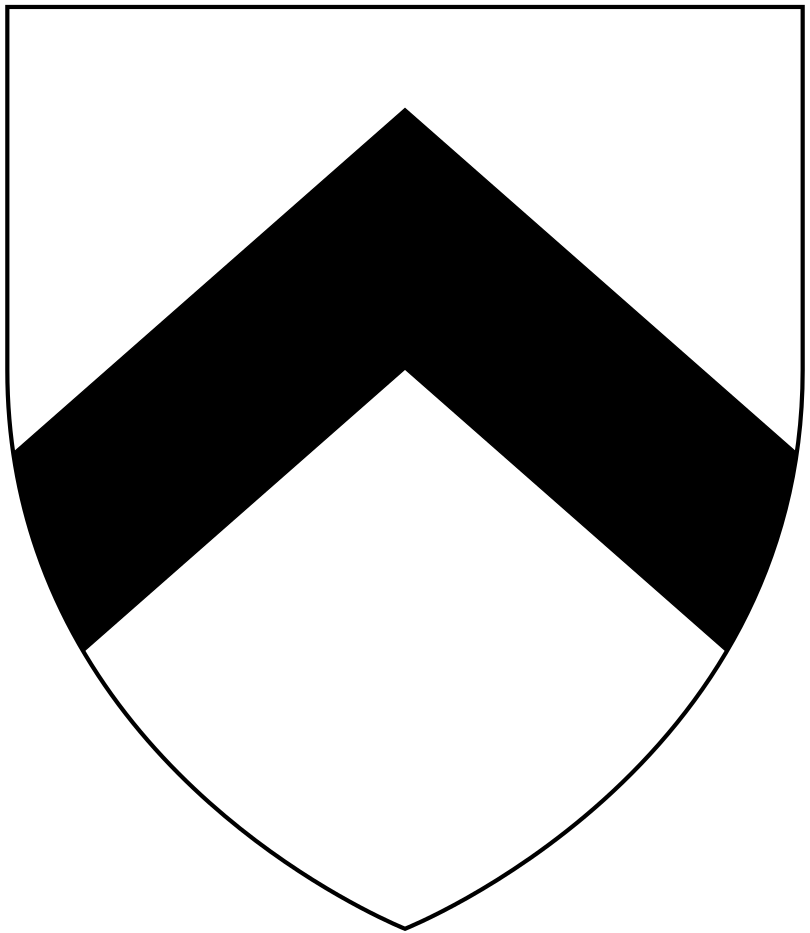
- Arms of Trelawny: Argent, a chevron sable
- Born: c.1722
- Died: 11 December 1772
- Military career
- Allegiance: Great Britain
- Branch: Royal Navy
- Service years: c.1743–1772
- Rank: Captain
- Commands: HMS Peregrine; HMS Port Mahon; HMS Vestal; HMS Lion; HMS Winchester; HMS St Florentine
- Conflicts: War of the Austrian Succession; Battle of Toulon; Seven Years' War; Invasion of Martinique; Invasion of Guadeloupe

Sir William Trelawny, 6th Baronet (c. 1722 – 11 December 1772), of Trelawne, Cornwall was a British politician and colonial administrator.

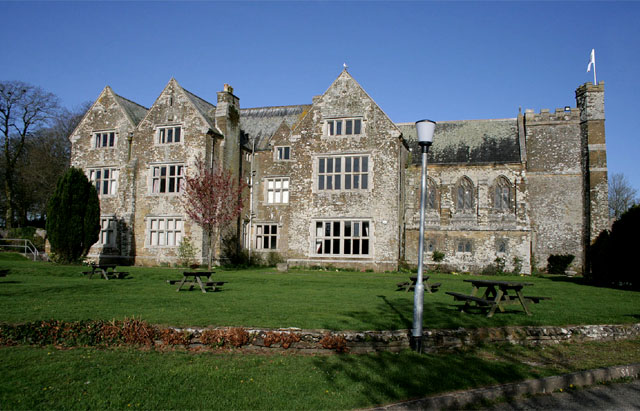
Trelawne House

He was the son of Captain William Trelawny, R.N. and educated at Westminster School. He succeeded his uncle Sir Harry Trelawny, 5th Baronet to the baronetcy in 1762, inheriting the Trelawne estate.

Trelawny sat as Member of Parliament for West Looe from 1757 to 1767. The latter year he was appointed Governor of Jamaica, a post he held until his death in December 1772. Trelawny Parish, Jamaica was named after him.

He died in Jamaica in 1772. He had married his cousin Laetitia, the daughter and heiress of Sir Harry Trelawny, 5th Baronet, with whom he had a son and a daughter.

Parliament of Great Britain
Preceded by John Frederick; William Noel	Member of Parliament for West Looe; 1757–1767; With: John Frederick 1757–1761; Francis Buller 1761–1765; John Sargent 1765–1767	Succeeded by John Sargent; James Townsend
Government offices
Preceded by Roger Hope Elletson	Governor of Jamaica; 1767–1772	Succeeded by John Dalling
Baronetage of England
Preceded by Harry Trelawny	Baronet (of Trelawny); 1762–1772	Succeeded by Harry Trelawny
