= Ambrose Bellot =

Member of the Parliament of England

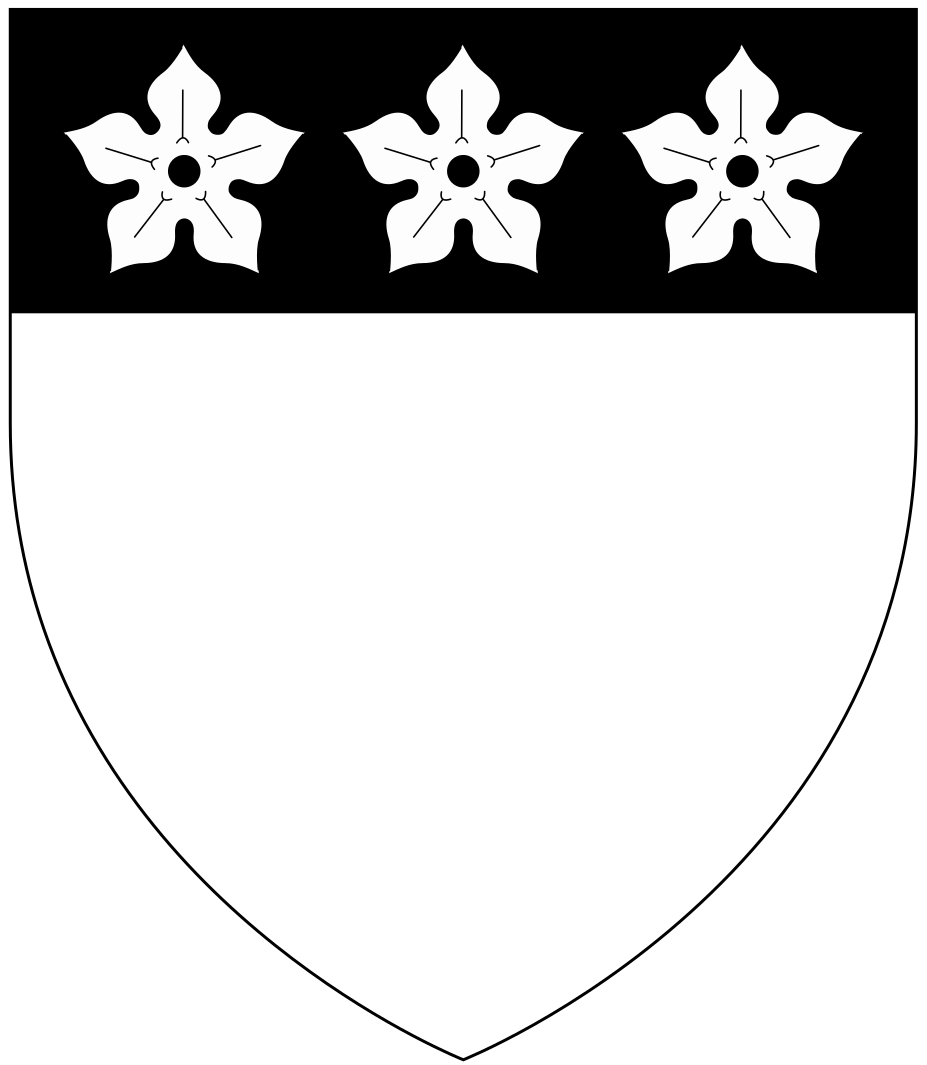
Arms of Bellot: Argent, on a chief sable three cinquefoils of the field

Ambrose Bellot (c. 1561 – 1637), of Downton in Devon was a Member of Parliament for East Looe in Cornwall in 1597.

== Biography ==
He was the third son of Francis Bellott of Corsham, Wiltshire and of Bochym, Cornwall, by his wife Anne Mohun, a daughter of Reginald Mohun (1507/8-1567) of Hall, in the parish of Lanteglos-by-Fowey, and of Boconnoc, both in Cornwall, MP, an Esquire of the Body to Queen Elizabeth I. The Mohun family controlled one of the parliamentary seats of the pocket borough of East Looe in Cornwall, and Ambrose was in due course nominated by the Mohuns to that seat in 1597.

Bellot married twice:

- Firstly in 1596, as her 4th husband, to Eleanor Smith, daughter and sole heiress of the wealthy Bernard Smith (died 1591) of Totnes in Devon, Member of Parliament for Totnes in 1558, mayor of Totnes in 1549–50 and c. 1565–6, and escheator of Devon and Cornwall in 1567–8. Eleanor had married three times previously as follows:
  - Firstly to John Charles (1543–68) of Tavistock, whose great-great-grandfather John Charles of Morton Hampstead in Devon had married Margery Foorde, daughter and heiress of Richard Foorde long seated at the estate of Foorde in the parish of Moretonhampstead, which estate had been given to his ancestor Ely (or Elias) Foorde by William de Mandeville, 3rd Earl of Essex (died 1189). Without issue.
  - Secondly on 30 January 1569/70 at Totnes Eleanor married, as his 2nd wife, Sir John Fulford (1524–1580) of Great Fulford, Dunsford, Devon, Sheriff of Devon in 1557 and 1576. Without issue.
  - Thirdly Eleanor married John Wrey (died before 1596) of North Russell in Devon and Trebeigh, St Ive, in Cornwall, eldest son of John Wrey (died 1597), Sheriff of Cornwall in 1587, and brother of Sir William Wrey, 1st Baronet (died 1636). The large chest tomb monument to John Wrey showing kneeling effigies of him and his wife Blanche Killigrew (died 1595), heiress of Trebeigh, survives in the north transept of St Peter's Church in Tawstock, Devon, a later seat of the Wrey family, having been removed in 1924 from St Ive Church in Cornwall. The arms of Smith of Totnes Barry undé of sixteen argent and azure, on a chief gules three barnacles or are shown on the front of the chest tomb impaled by Wrey. Without issue.

He had no children by Eleanor Smith.

- Secondly he married Lucy Stockett (died 1631), widow of a certain Wood of Modbury, by whom he had one daughter and sole heiress:
  - Elizabeth Bellot, still a minor on her father's death.

He died intestate in 1637.
