= Thomas Smith (died 1728) =

Thomas Smith (c. 1686–1728), of South Tidworth, Hampshire, was a British landowner and Whig politician who sat in the House of Commons between 1709 and 1728.

Smith was the eldest son of John Smith, a leading Whig politician, and his second wife Anne Strickland, daughter of Sir Thomas Strickland of Boynton, Yorkshire. He was appointed to office as Clerk of the Council in extraordinary in March 1706, probably due to his father's influence. In July 1706 he was sent to the Elector of Hanover, with the son of the Earl of Scarbrough, to give their respective fathers' compliments.

Smith was returned as Member of Parliament for Milborne Port at a by-election 7 May 1709, probably with the support of the other Member for the borough, Sir Thomas Travell, to whom he may have been related through Travell's mother. He voted for the impeachment of Dr Sacheverell in 1710 but his other parliamentary activities are almost impossible to distinguish. At the 1710 election, he transferred to East Looe. He was removed from office, along with his father, in 1712. He voted on 18 June 1713 against the French commerce bill. He did not stand at the 1713 election but returned to Parliament after the accession of George I, when he was classed as a Whig.

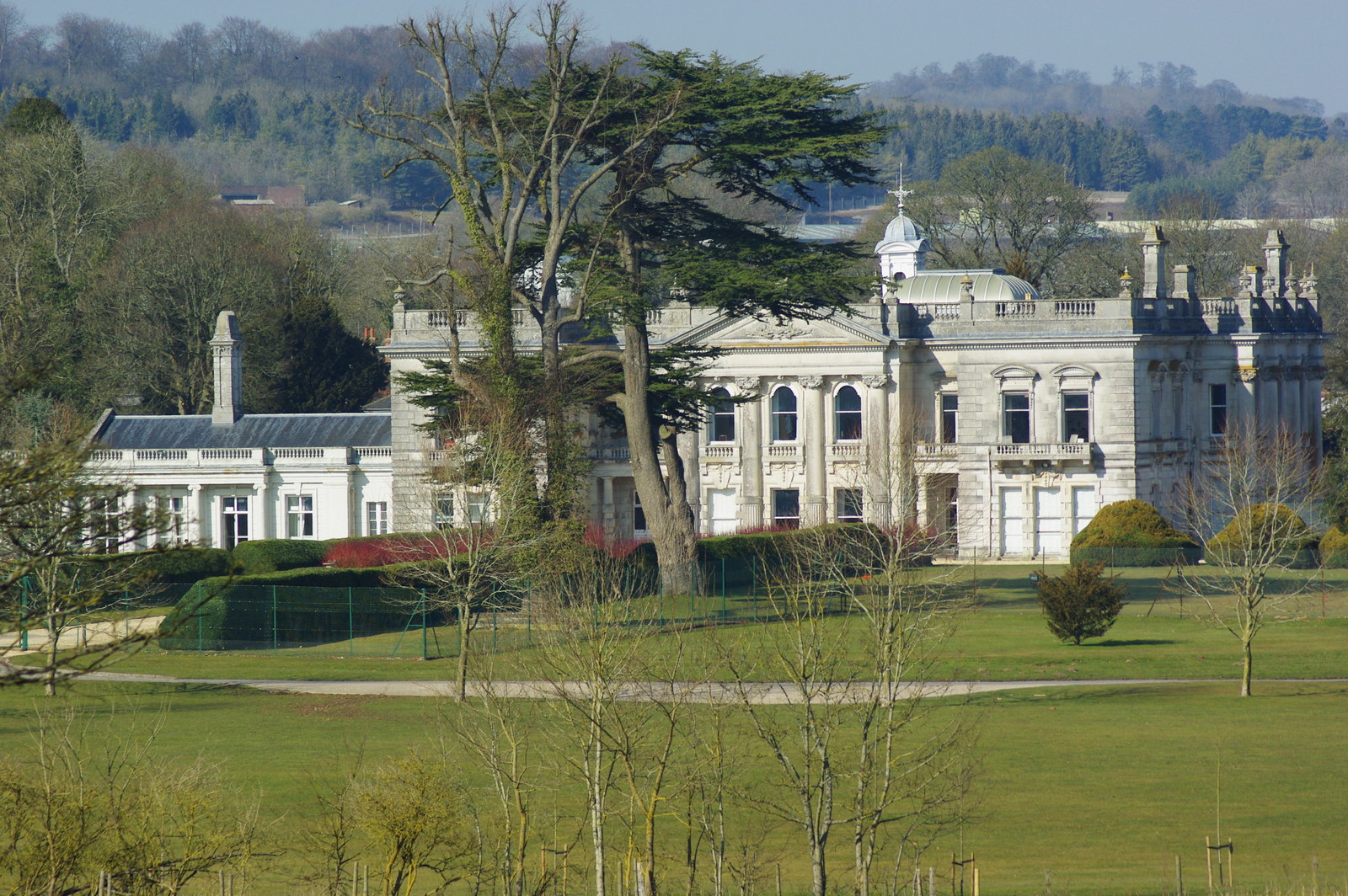
Tedworth House, South Tidworth, as rebuilt in the 19th century

Smith was returned Whig MP for Eye at the 1715 election on the Cornwallis interest. He voted against the septennial bill and the repeal of the Occasional Conformity and Schism Acts, but for the Peerage Bill. He did not stand at the 1722 election. In 1723 he succeeded his father to the Tedworth House estate at South Tidworth. He was brought in for Tregony on the Treasury interest at the 1727 election after George II's accession, when he obtained a court office as vice-chamberlain to Queen Caroline 1727.

Smith died unmarried on 3 August 1728. The Tedworth estate was inherited by Thomas Assheton of Ashley Hall, Cheshire.

Parliament of Great Britain
Preceded by Sir Thomas Travell; Thomas Medlycott	Member of Parliament for Milborne Port; 1709–1710; With: Sir Thomas Travell	Succeeded by Sir Thomas Travell; James Medlycott
Preceded by Sir Henry Seymour; Harry Trelawny	Member of Parliament for East Looe; 1710–1713; With: Sir Henry Seymour	Succeeded by Sir Charles Hedges; Edward Jennings
Preceded by Edward Hopkins; Thomas Maynard	Member of Parliament for Eye; 1715–1722; With: Edward Hopkins	Succeeded by Edward Hopkins; Hon. Spencer Compton
Preceded by James Cooke; John Merrill	Member of Parliament for Tregony; 1727–1728; With: John Goddard	Succeeded by Matthew Ducie Moreton; John Goddard
