= Sir Henry Seymour, 1st Baronet =

British politician (1674–1714)

Sir Henry Seymour, 1st Baronet (20 October 1674 – April 1714), of Langley, Buckinghamshire, was an English landowner and Tory politician who sat in the English and British House of Commons from 1699 to 1713.

Seymour was the second son of Henry Seymour, of Langley, Buckinghamshire Groom of the Bedchamber, and his second wife Ursula Austen, daughter of Sir Robert Austen, 1st Baronet, and widow of George Stawale. He was the paternal grandson of Sir Edward Seymour, 2nd Baronet, and wife Dorothy Killegrew. He was created 1st Baronet Seymour, of Langley, at the age of seven on 4 July 1681. His father died on 9 March 1687, and he inherited Langley Park and his father's reversionary grant of the clerkship of the hanaper office. From 1693 he travelled abroad for three years.

Seymour was returned unopposed as Tory Member of Parliament for East Looe at a by-election on 17 January 1699 in the interest of his cousin Bishop Trelawny of Exeter. He was returned again unopposed at the two general elections of 1701 and in 1702 and 1705. He voted against the Court candidate for Speaker on 25 October 1705. Returned again at the 1708 British general election, he voted against the impeachment of Dr Sacheverell in 1710. He was returned again at the 1710 British general election. He was one of the 'worthy patriots' who detected the mismanagements of the previous administration and a member of the October Club. He stood down at the 1713 British general election, probably through ill=health.

Seymour died unmarried and without issue in London in April 1714. Langley Park, Buckinghamshire was sold in 1714 to Samuel Masham, 1st Baron Masham.

Parliament of England
Preceded by Charles Trelawny; Henry Trelawny	Member of Parliament for East Looe; 1699–1707; With: Henry Trelawny 1699–1701; Hon. Francis Godolphin 1701–1702; George Courtenay 1702; Sir John Pole, Bt 1702–1705; George Clarke 1705–1707	Succeeded by Parliament of Great Britain
Parliament of Great Britain
Preceded by Parliament of England	Member of Parliament for East Looe; 1707–1713; With: George Clarke 1707–1708; Harry Trelawny 1708–1710; Thomas Smith 1710–1713	Succeeded by Sir Charles Hedges; Edward Jennings
Baronetage of England
New creation	Baronet (of Langley); 1681–1714	Extinct
