= John Blackmore =

English politician

John Blackmore was an English politician who sat in the House of Commons in 1654.

Blackmore was the son of John Blackmore of Exeter, Devon. He matriculated at Exeter College, Oxford on 12 December 1634, aged 18. He was awarded BA on 16 January 1640 and MA on 19 May 1649 when he was a major in the army.

In 1654, Blackmore was elected Member of Parliament for Tiverton in the First Protectorate Parliament, but the election was declared void. He sat instead for the combined seat of East Looe and West Looe.

Blackmore is said to have been knighted by Oliver Cromwell. He was Sheriff of Devon in 1657 or 1658.

Parliament of England
| Preceded by Not represented in Barebones Parliament | Member of Parliament for Tiverton; 1654 | Succeeded by Robert Shapcote |
| Preceded by Not represented in Barebones Parliament | Member of Parliament for East and West Looe; 1654 | Succeeded by John Buller |
