= John Buller (politician, born 1632) =

English politician

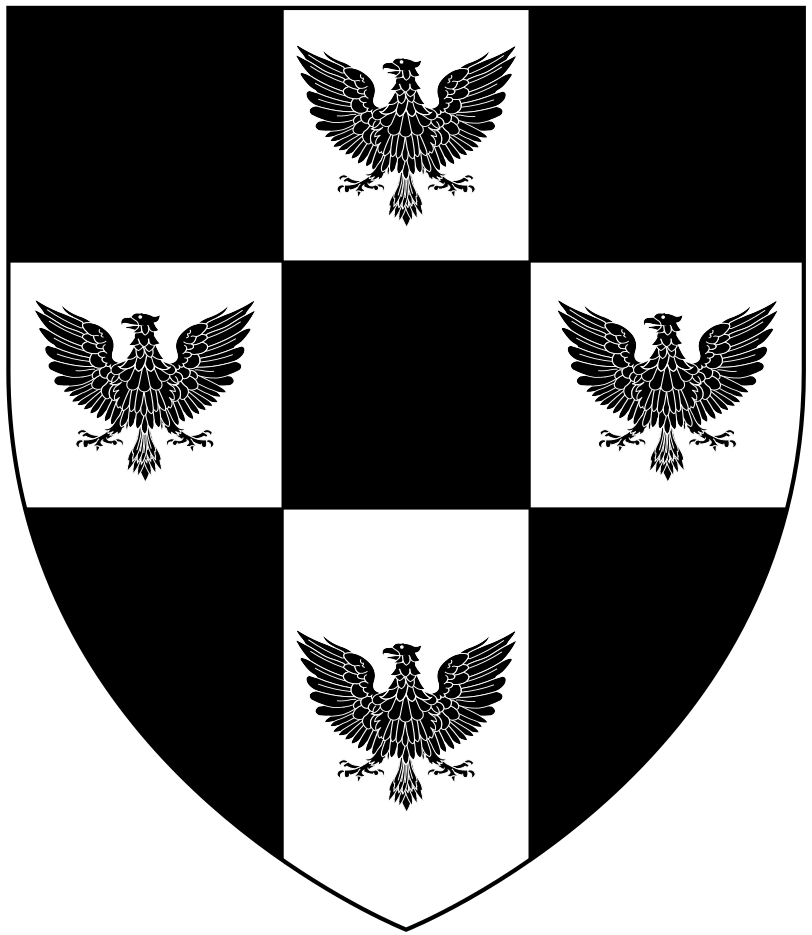
Arms of Buller: Sable, on a cross argent quarter pierced of the field four eagles displayed of the first

John Buller (1632–1716) was an English politician who sat in the House of Commons variously between 1656 and 1695.

Buller inherited from his father the Cornish estate of Shillingham near Saltash, and owned an estate in the Isle of Thanet. He inherited from his first wife the Cornish estate of Morval, near Looe, in Cornwall. His ancestors had long been active in the county administration of Cornwall and he was himself ancestor to many eminent men, several members of parliament, the Buller baronets and Baron Churston and the famous soldier Major-General Sir Redvers Buller (1839–1908), VC.

== Origins ==
The Bullers were a west country family who had become yeoman tenants following the dissolution of Glastonbury Abbey. John Buller was the second son of Francis Buller, MP for Cornwall in 1640, of Shillingham near Saltash, in Cornwall and Ospringe in Kent by his wife Thomasine Honywood daughter of Sir Thomas Honywood. He was heir to his nephew James Buller (d.1707), who was the only son of his elder brother Francis Buller (1630–1682), MP and who died without progeny. Francis had married Elizabeth Grosse, daughter and heiress of Ezekiel Grosse of Gowlden, who inherited 17 manors from her father.

== Education ==
He entered the Middle Temple on 29 January 1646 and matriculated at Trinity College, Cambridge on 6 July 1647. Although he was called to the bar in 1652 it is not known whether he actually practised.

== Career ==
Buller served as MP several times as follows:

- 1656 MP for the combined constituency of East Looe and West Looe in the Second Protectorate Parliament.
- 1659 MP for East Looe and also for Saltash in the Third Protectorate Parliament, choosing to represent East Looe
- 1660 MP for West Looe in the Convention Parliament.
- 1661 MP for Saltash in the Cavalier Parliament.
- 1679, 1681 and 1689 MP for Liskeard.
- 1692 MP for Grampound and held the seat until 1695.

== Sheriff of Cornwall ==
He was appointed High Sheriff of Cornwall from November 1688 to March 1689.

== Marriages ==
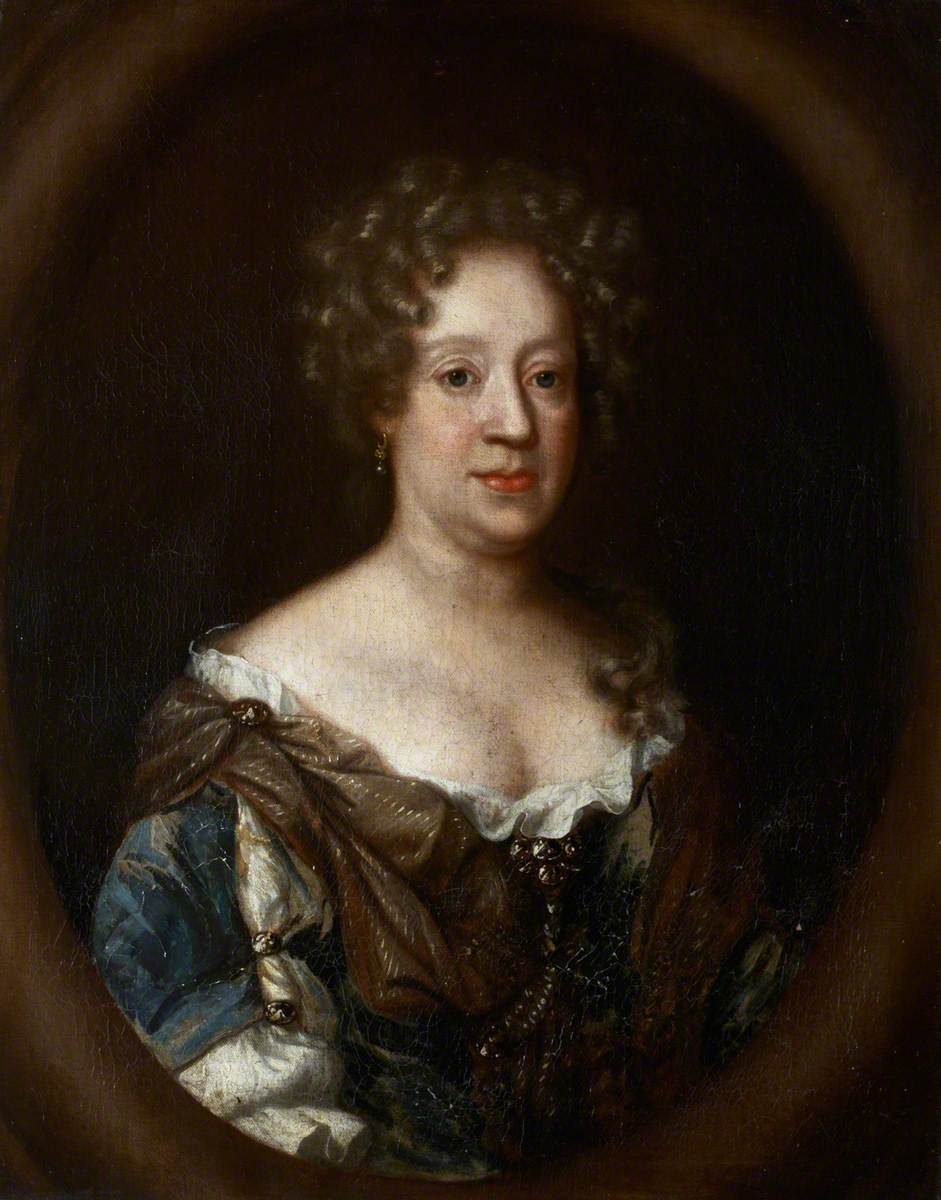
Anne Coode (b.1639), daughter and sole heiress of John Coode of Morval, and wife of John Buller (1632–1716). Portrait attributed to Mary Beale, c.1675/1685. National Trust, collection of Antony House, Cornwall, ref. 353104

Buller married twice:

- Firstly in 1657 to Anne Coode, daughter and sole heiress of John Coode of Morval. He had issue by her John Buller (1668–1701), MP for Lostwithiel in 1701, of Morval, eldest son and heir, who married Mary Pollexfen, 3rd daughter and co-heiress of Sir Henry Pollexfen, Lord Chief Justice of the Common Pleas. John died of smallpox and predeceased his father, but left a son John Francis Buller (1695–1751), of Morval, MP for Saltash 1718–1722, himself the father of three members of parliament: James Buller (1717–1765), John Buller (1721–1786), Lord of the Admiralty and Francis Buller (1723–1764).
- Secondly to Jane Langdon, daughter of Walter Langdon of Keverall near East Looe.

Parliament of England
Preceded by John Blackmore	Member of Parliament for East Looe; 1656–1659; With: John Kendall 1659	Succeeded by Not represented in restored Rump
Preceded by John Blackmore	Member of Parliament for West Looe; 1656	Succeeded by William Petty; William Whitelocke
Preceded by Not represented in restored Rump	Member of Parliament for Saltash; 1660–1679; With: Francis Buller	Succeeded by Bernard Granville; Nicholas Courtney
