= Edward Trelawny (colonial administrator) =

British politician, army officer and colonial administrator

Colonel Edward Trelawny

Governor of Jamaica
- In office April 1738 – September 1752
- Monarch: George II
- Preceded by: John Gregory
- Succeeded by: Charles Knowles

Personal details
- Born: c. 1699 Trelawne, Pelynt
- Died: 16 January 1754 (aged 54–55) London, England

Military service
- Allegiance: Great Britain; Austria
- Branch/service: British Army; Imperial Army
- Years of service: 1734–1735; 1743–1754
- Rank: Colonel (British Army)
- Commands: Edward Trelawny's Regiment of Foot
- Battles/wars: War of the Polish Succession; First Maroon War

Colonel Edward Trelawny (c. 1699 – 16 January 1754) was a British politician, army officer and colonial administrator who served as the governor of Jamaica from 1738 to 1752. Trelawny served in the Imperial Army of the Holy Roman Emperor during the War of the Polish Succession and represented the constituencies of West Looe and East Looe in the House of Commons of Great Britain from 1724 to 1732 and ended the First Maroon War by signing two peace treaties with the Jamaican Maroons between 1739 and 1740. In 1743 he raised Edward Trelawny's Regiment of Foot, serving as the regimental colonel until his death in 1754.

== Early life and political career ==
Edward Trelawny was born c. 1699 in Trelawne, Pelynt. His father was Sir Jonathan Trelawny, 3rd Baronet, a Church of England bishop who played a major role in the Glorious Revolution. After studying at Westminster School and the University of Oxford, Trelawny entered into a political career, being elected to the British House of Commons in January 1724 after a winning a parliamentary by-election for the constituency of West Looe. He was also given the position of commissioner of victualling, and spoke both in favour and against the policies of the Walpole–Townshend and Walpole ministries, claiming that he did not wish to be thought of "as a party man, which I think I am as little as any one, perhaps too little to please any one".

A friend of fellow member of Parliament Sir Charles Wager, Trelawny vacated his parliamentary seat in December 1732 after being given the job of commissioner of customs in Edinburgh by British Prime Minister Robert Walpole. In 1734 Trelawny left Scotland and travelled to Continental Europe, where he joined the Imperial Army of the Holy Roman Emperor to fight against the French in the War of the Polish Succession. The war ended in 1735 and during his absence from Britain Trelawny was elected in absentia to Parliament for the constituencies of both West Looe and East Looe. However both elections were declared void as Trelawny was still serving as commissioner of customs in Edinburgh and ineligible to sit in Parliament. Trelawyn wrote to Thomas Robinson on the matter:

The elections, you know, are void of course upon account of my place. If Sir Charles does not get me out before a new election can be made, I can’t receive the benefit of the Looers’ favour so voluntarily bestowed on the mad volunteer: but I have left everything to Sir Charles Wager and whether I am to be senator, commissioner, or neither, I shall be easy under his decision and management.

He stopped serving as commissioner of customs in Edinburgh in 1737, having given up his office as commissioner of victualling in December 1732.

== Governor of Jamaica ==
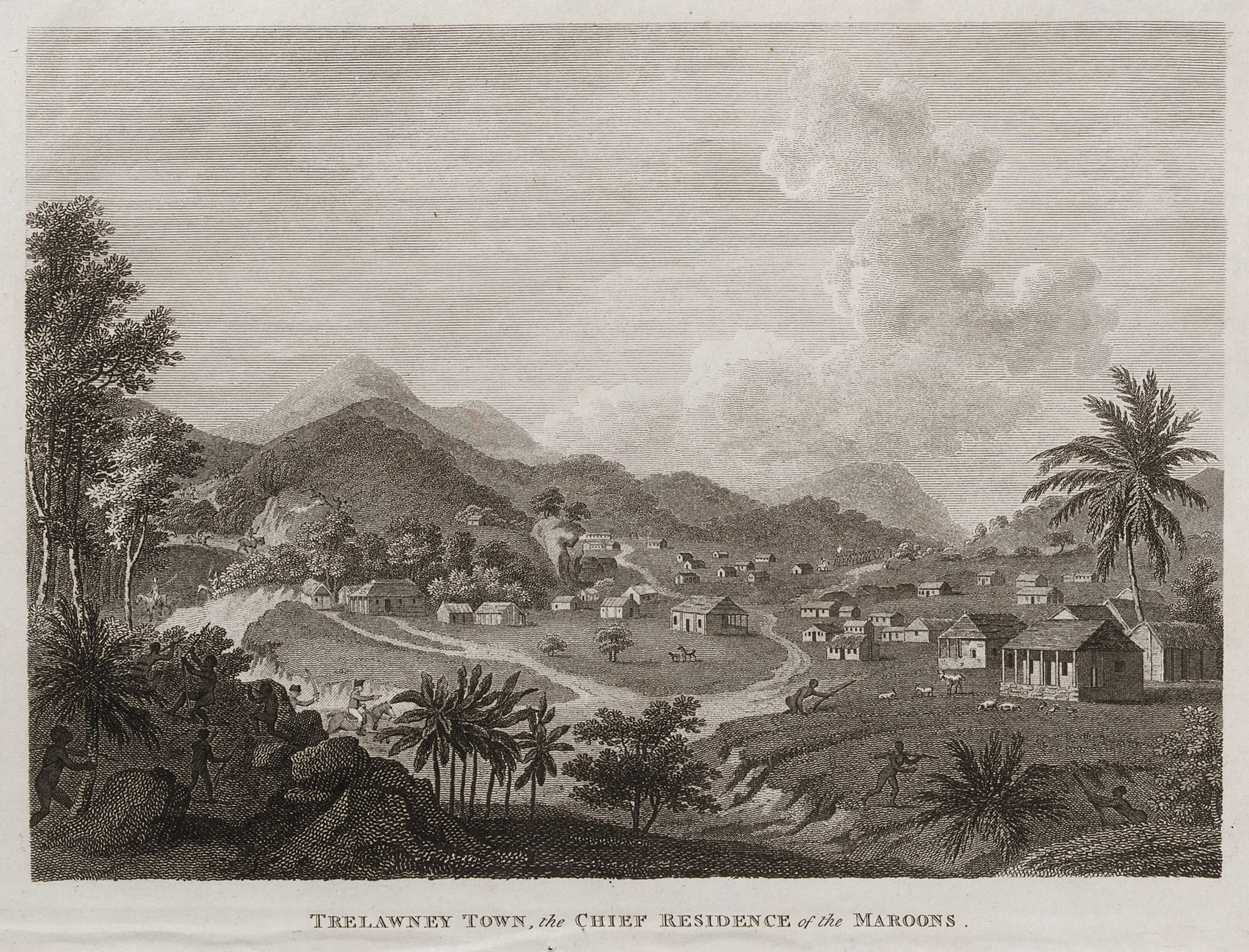
A lithograph of Trelawny Town, which was named in Trelawny's honour

In April 1738 Trelawny was appointed as the governor of Jamaica, succeeding John Gregory at a time when the colony of Jamaica was in the midst of the First Maroon War against the Jamaican Maroons. Quickly realising that the British were unable to defeat the Maroons, in 1739 Trelawny offered the Leeward Maroon village of Cudjoe's Town a peace agreement, which its leader Cudjoe accepted, renaming his settlement "Trelawny Town" in Trelawny's honour. Trelawny quickly offered a similar treaty to the Windward Maroons, which was supported by Jamaica's white colonists. Both treaties formally recognised the Maroons' status as free people of colour, officially allocated them land in the Jamaican interior to establish settlements and exempted them from paying tax to the colonial authorities. In return the Maroons agreed to return all escaped slaves back to their enslavers and take part in suppressing future slave rebellions when called upon. The treaties brought the war to an end and ushered in a period of peace in Jamaica.

In 1743 Trelawny raised Edward Trelawny's Regiment of Foot from eight British Army independent companies stationed in Jamaica, becoming the new regiment's colonel. Two years later he wrote and published a pamphlet titled An Essay concerning Slavery, in which Trelawny stated his desire "that Slavery was abolish'd entirely". In the pamphlet he argued that the Jamaican slavocracy owned too many slaves and mistreated those they enslaved, though aware of slavery's importance Trelawny merely suggested that the slave trade be abolished and "Time will do the rest." Though the pamphlet angered the Jamaican slavocracy and Parliament it brought no changed to slavery's status in Jamaica. Trelawny was replaced as governor by Charles Knowles in September 1752.

== Later life and death ==
While serving as governor Trelawny married Catherine Penny on 2 February 1752. Penny was the widow of Attorney General of Jamaica Robert Penny and had inherited from her husband between £30,000 and £40,000 "in Jamaican money". However shortly after marrying Penny Trelawny requested that he be replaced as governor due to having contracted a cardiovascular disease. He subsequently received praise from the House of Assembly of Jamaica for conducting a "just administration" and for the "many important services" he had rendered as governor. On November 1752 Trelawny set sail to England onboard HMS Assurance. In April 1753 as Assurance was nearing the Isle of Wight she struck Goose Rock near The Needles and was wrecked, though Trelawny was rescued. He died on 16 January 1754 in London at the age of 55, bequething his properties in Trelawne and Looe to his brother John as his marriage with Penny produced no children.

Parliament of Great Britain
Preceded by George Delaval; Sir John Trelawny	Member of Parliament for West Looe; 1724–1732; With: Sir John Trelawny 1724–1727; John Willes	Succeeded by John Willes; Thomas Walker
Preceded by Charles Longueville; Sir John Trelawny	Member of Parliament for East Looe; 1734–1735; With: Charles Longueville	Succeeded by Charles Longueville; Samuel Holden
Preceded by John Willes; Thomas Walker	Member of Parliament for West Looe; 1734–1735; With: John Willes	Succeeded by John Willes; John Owen
Government offices
Preceded by John Gregory	Governor of Jamaica; April 1738–September 1752	Succeeded by Charles Knowles
Military offices
New regiment	Colonel of the 49th Regiment of Foot	Succeeded by George Walsh
