= Sir Jonathan Trelawny, 3rd Baronet =

English bishop (1650–1721)

The Right Reverend Sir Jonathan Trelawny Bt
- Bishop of Winchester
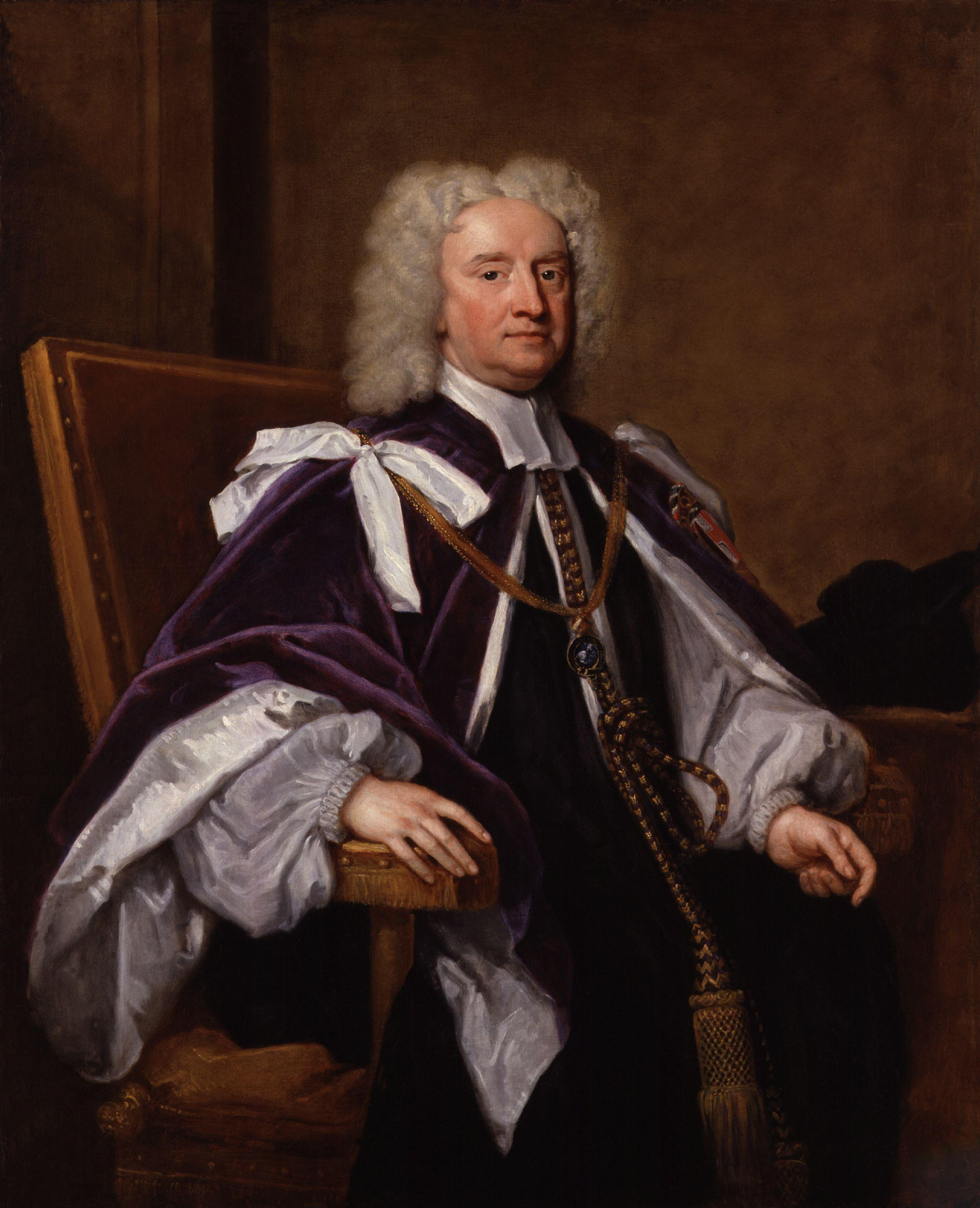
- Portrait by Godfrey Kneller, 1720
- Church: Church of England
- Diocese: Winchester
- In office: 1707–1721
- Predecessor: Peter Mews
- Successor: Charles Trimnell
- Previous posts: Bishop of Bristol (1685–1689); Bishop of Exeter (1689–1707)

Orders
- Consecration: 8 November 1685 by William Sancroft

Personal details
- Born: 24 March 1650 Trelawne, Cornwall, England
- Died: 19 July 1721 (aged 71) Chelsea, Middlesex, England
- Denomination: Anglican
- Education: Westminster School; Christ Church, Oxford

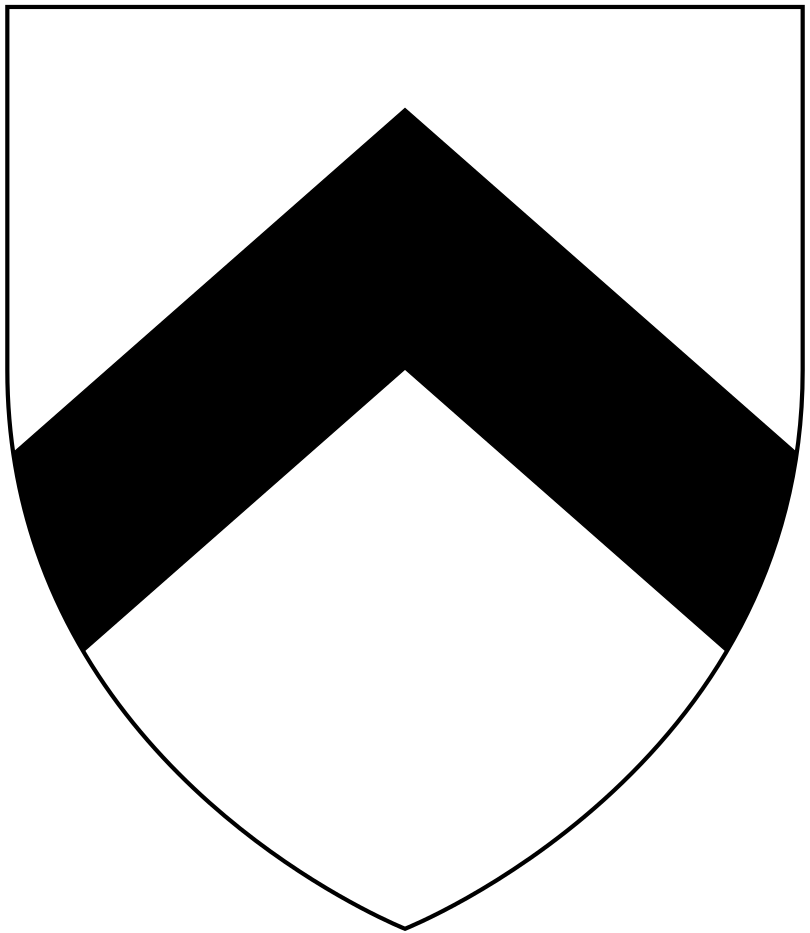
Arms of Trelawny: Argent, a chevron sable

Sir Jonathan Trelawny, 3rd Baronet (24 March 1650 – 19 July 1721) was Bishop of Bristol, Bishop of Exeter and Bishop of Winchester. Trelawny is best known for his role in the events leading up to the Glorious Revolution which are sometimes believed to be referenced in the Cornish anthem "The Song of the Western Men".

== Life ==
He was born at Trelawne in the parish of Pelynt, Cornwall, the eldest surviving son of Sir Jonathan Trelawny, 2nd Baronet, and Mary Seymour, daughter of Sir Edward Seymour, 2nd Baronet. He was educated at Westminster School and then went to Christ Church, Oxford at the start of the Michaelmas term of 1668 where he distinguished himself as a scholar.

A staunch royalist, he was ordained in 1673 and became a beneficed clergyman. He was appointed rector of South Hill on 4 October and of St. Ives on 12 December 1677, becoming Bishop of Bristol in 1685. He was one of the Seven Bishops tried for seditious libel under James II. Trelawny and the other bishops petitioned against James II's Declaration of Indulgence in 1687 and 1688, (granting religious tolerance to Catholics) and as a result, he was arrested and imprisoned in the Tower of London on charges of seditious libel. The bishops said that whilst they were loyal to King James II, their consciences would not agree to allowing freedom of worship to Catholics even if it were to be within the privacy of their own homes as the Declaration proposed; thus they could not sign. Trelawny was held for three weeks before trial, then tried and acquitted; this led to great celebrations, with bells being rung in his home parish of Pelynt.

In 1689, after the military defeat of James II and the accession of the Protestant William of Orange to the British throne, Trelawny was rewarded by being appointed Bishop of Exeter (whilst still, until 1694, Archdeacon of Totnes). He was further rewarded by being appointed Bishop of Winchester in 1707. His promotion to the See of Winchester was a matter of some controversy, as Queen Anne, who was determined to keep all important Church appointments within her own gift, overruled the advice of her ministers and of Thomas Tenison, the Archbishop of Canterbury in appointing him, thus provoking the so-called Bishoprics Crisis. He died in 1721, in Chelsea, Middlesex; his body was taken back to Pelynt for burial.

== Family ==
He married Rebecca Hele, by whom he had twelve children:

- Charlotte Trelawny (1687/8 – aft. 1745), unmarried
- Letitia Trelawny (born 1689), married Sir Harry Trelawny, 5th Baronet
- Sir John Trelawny, 4th Baronet (1691–1756)
- Henry Trelawny (1692–1707), fought in the War of the Spanish Succession and died with Admiral Sir Cloudesley Shovell aboard HMS Association during the Scilly naval disaster of 1707.
- Charles Trelawny (1694 – 24 August 1721), without issue, prebendary of Westminster
- Rebecca Trelawny (1696–1743), married John Francis Buller in 1716
- Elizabeth Trelawny (1697 – 25 January 1744), married Rev. George Allanson (died 1741), Archdeacon of Cornwall
- Edward Trelawny (1699–1754), became governor of Jamaica
- Mary Trelawny (born 1700), died in infancy
- Rev. Hele Trelawny (1703–1740), without issue
- Jonathan Trelawny (born 1705), died in infancy
- Anne Trelawny (1707–1745), unmarried

== Reputation ==
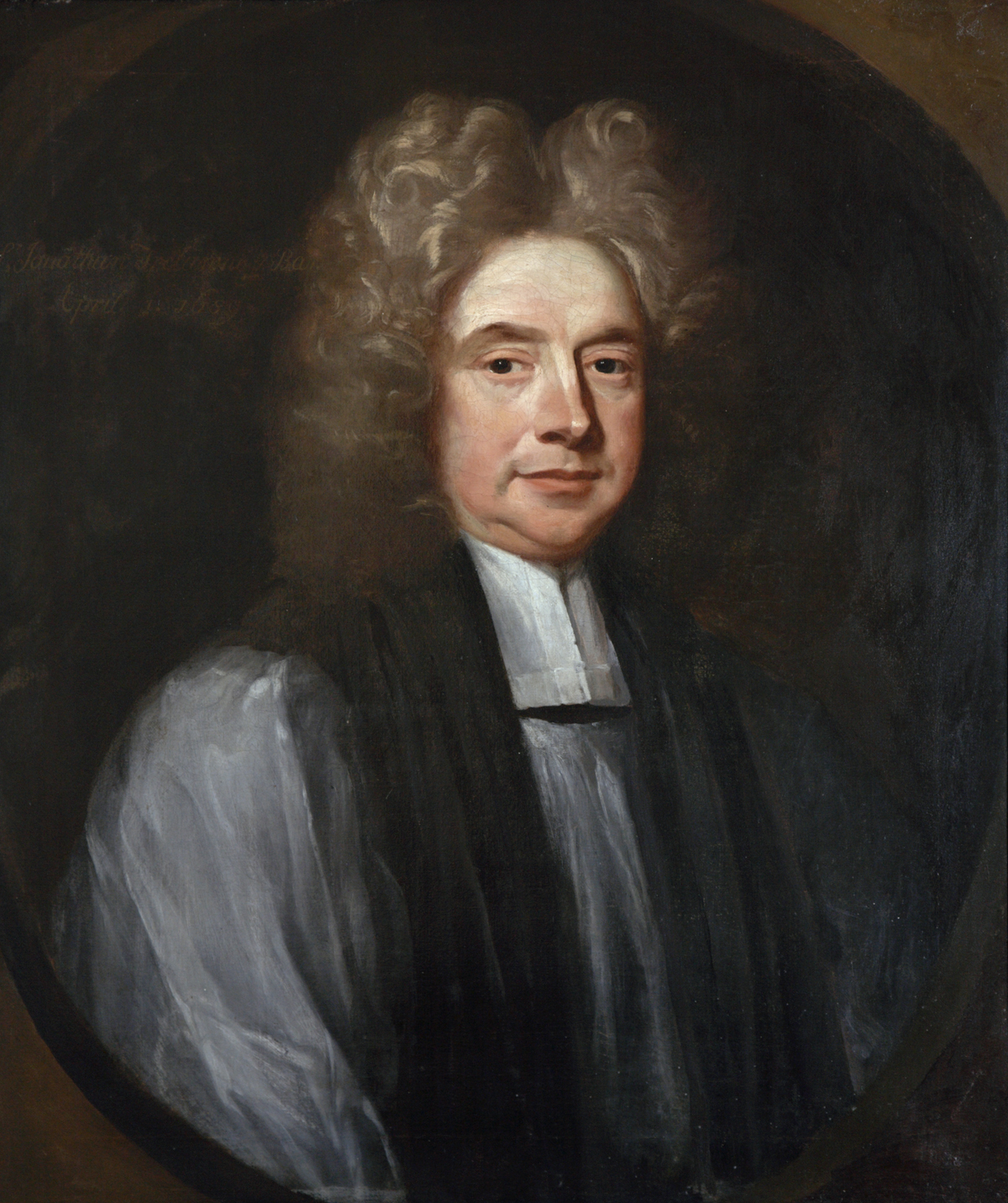
Jonathan Trelawny features in the lyrics of "The Song of the Western Men".

It is sometimes suggested that Bishop Trelawny was immortalised in the Cornish Anthem, "The Song of the Western Men", better known simply as "Trelawny", written over a century later and composed by Parson Robert Stephen Hawker, vicar of Morwenstow.

And shall Trelawny live?
Or shall Trelawny die!
Here's twenty thousand Cornish men
Will know the reason why!

== Notes ==
Church of England titles
Preceded by John Lake	Bishop of Bristol; 1685–1689	Succeeded by Gilbert Ironside
Preceded by Thomas Lamplugh	Bishop of Exeter; 1689–1707	Succeeded by Ofspring Blackall
Preceded by Peter Mews	Bishop of Winchester; 1707–1721	Succeeded by Charles Trimnell
Honorary titles
Preceded by John Trelawny	Vice-Admiral of South Cornwall; 1682–1693	Succeeded by Henry Trelawny
Baronetage of England
Preceded by Jonathan Trelawny	Baronet (of Trelawney); 1681–1721	Succeeded by John Trelawny
