= John Trelawny (died 1680) =

English army officer

Captain John Trelawny (c. 1646 – 14 May 1680) was an English army officer of Cornish descent, the eldest son of Sir Jonathan Trelawny, 2nd Baronet.

Trelawny was appointed a Gentleman of the Privy Chamber in 1674, and was returned as Member of Parliament for West Looe in 1677.

He married Catherine Jenkyn and was killed, without issue, at Tangier, predeceasing his father.

Parliament of England
| Preceded by John Trelawny; Sir Henry Vernon, Bt | Member of Parliament for West Looe; 1677–1680; With: John Trelawny | Succeeded by John Trelawny; Jonathan Trelawny |
