= John Kendall (MP) =

English politician

John Kendall (born 1631) was an English politician who sat in the House of Commons at various times between 1659 and 1685.

Kendall was the eldest surviving son of John Kendall of Treworgey and his wife Mary. He was baptised on 7 August 1631. In 1649, he entered Lincoln's Inn. He was a commissioner for poor prisoners in 1653 and a J.P. for Cornwall from 1653 to July 1660. In 1657 he was a commissioner for assessment 1657.

In 1659, Kendall was elected Member of Parliament for East Looe in the Third Protectorate Parliament. He became a commissioner for assessment in January 1660, a commissioner for militia in March 1660, and a lieutenant colonel of the militia in April 1660. Also in April 1660, he was elected MP for West Looe in the Convention Parliament. On the restoration, he lost his position as JP. He was a commissioner for assessment from 1663 to 1680. In 1673 he became freeman of West Looe 1672 and in 1678 freeman of East Looe. He stood unsuccessfully for parliament at East Looe twice in 1679, but was elected MP for East Looe in 1681 and sat until 1685. He was reinstated as a JP for Cornwall in June 1688 and was commissioner for assessment from 1689 to 1700.

Kendall was unmarried. He died some time after July 1702.

Parliament of England
Preceded by John Buller	Member of Parliament for East Looe; 1659; With: John Buller	Succeeded by Not represented in Restored Rump
