= Pelynt =

Village in Cornwall, England

Coordinates: 50°22′N 4°32′W

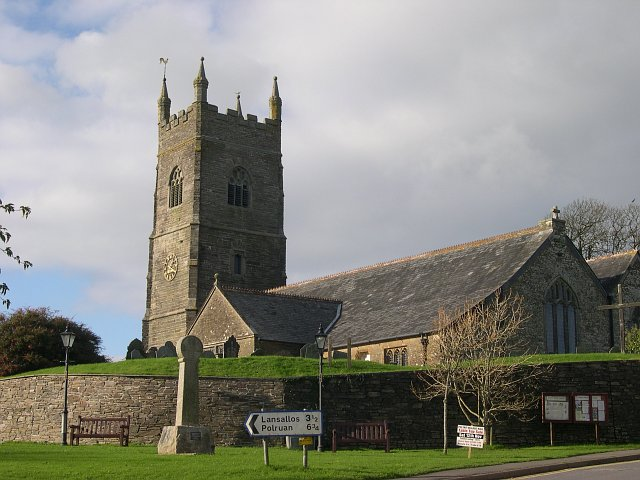
Pelynt Church

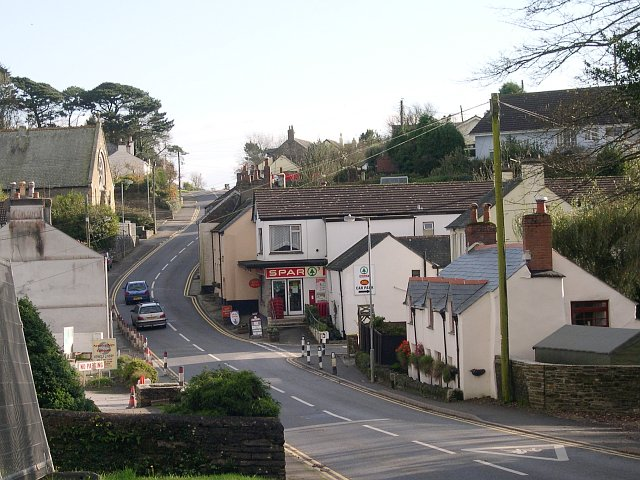
Pelynt village

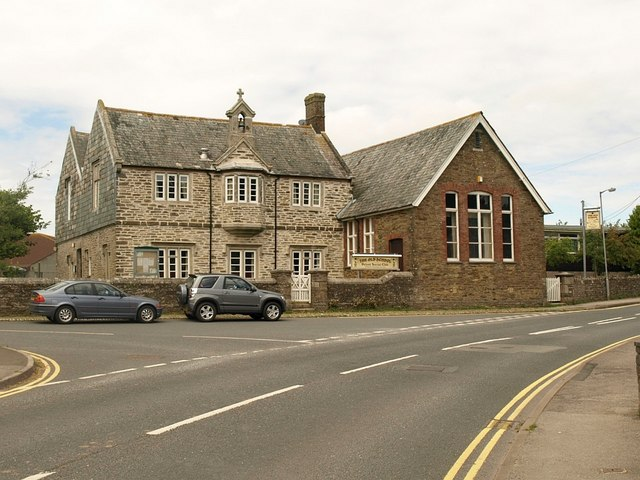
The Old School House, Pelynt

Pelynt (Cornish: Pluwnennys (village) or Pluw Nennys (parish)) is a civil parish and village in Cornwall, England, United Kingdom. It is 20 miles (32 km) west of Plymouth and four miles (6.5 km) west-northwest of Looe. Pelynt had a population of around 1,124 at the 2001 census which increased to 1,296 at the 2011 census. In addition, an electoral ward with the same name exists but extends towards Widegates avoiding Looe at all times. The population in 2011 for this ward was 4,453.

== History ==
The name Pelynt derives from the Cornish pluw (parish) and the name of either Saint Non, the mother of St David, or the male St Nynnid.

The manor of Pelynt is mentioned in the Domesday Book (1086) when it was valued much higher than Looe; it was held by Algar from Robert, Count of Mortain. There was half a hide of land and land for 8 ploughs. There were three and a half ploughs, 6 serfs, 4 villeins, 12 smallholders, 30 acres of woodland, 40 acres of pasture, 2 cattle, 14 pigs and 37 sheep. The value of the manor was £1 sterling though it had formerly been worth £2-10s.

The parish church is dedicated to St Nonna and built in the Perpendicular style. In about 1680, one of the arcades was remodelled in Tuscan Doric style. The tower is of the 14th century, earlier than the rest of the church. There are a number of interesting memorials including that of Bishop Jonathan Trelawny, whose pastoral staff is preserved in the church. Other notable members of the locally resident Trelawny family are also commemorated. In 1882 the south wall, Trelawny aisle, porch and vestry were restored for £1350 and the church was reopened on 12 October 1882.

The village has a school, founded in 1882, and a 16th-century inn, The Jubilee. The first mention of a post office in Pelynt was in May 1852, when a type of postmark known as an undated circle was issued. Details of some of the people who have run the post office, including William Churchill (1856), Harriet Andrews (1910) and Samuel Harvey (from 1929) appeared in a book published in 1988.

== Prehistory ==
There is an ancient barrow cemetery nearby: ten barrows still exist and others have been destroyed. The Rillaton Cup and the Pelynt Dagger are two artefacts that have been found in Cornwall that have been claimed to show contact with the Mycenaean world. However, a 2006 study of gold cups by Stuart Needham and others sees no reason to look so far afield for parallels and locates the cup in a group with other "unstable" cups (round-bottomed and unable to stand up) in precious materials found in north-western Europe. They propose a date around 1700 BC for the Rillaton Cup, though it may have been buried a long time after it was made. In contrast, the Pelynt Dagger might actually be Mycenaean but have made its way slowly across Europe over a considerable period.

== Cornish wrestling ==
Cornish wrestling tournaments, for prizes, were held in Pelynt in the 1800s.

== Historic estates ==
The parish contains historic estates including:

- Trelawne long the seat of the Trelawny family, later Trelawny baronets, one of the most eminent of Cornish gentry families.

== Notable residents ==
- Sir Jonathan Trelawny, 3rd Baronet of Trelawny (1650–1721), Bishop of Bristol, Exeter and Winchester.
- Eliza Fenwick (1767–1840), writer, was born in Pelynt
- Hamelin Trelawny (1782–1846), soldier and politician who served as Governor of Saint Helena, 1842-1846.
- Seven sons of the Rev. Canon William Shuckforth Grigson and Mary Beatrice Boldero were born in the vicarage; five died in the two world wars. They included:
  - John Grigson (1893–1943), aviator, died in an air crash
  - Wilfrid Grigson (1896–1948), soldier and civil servant
  - Geoffrey Grigson (1905–1985), poet and author of Freedom of the Parish. London: Phoenix House (1954)
