= Trelawne =

Manor in Pelynt, Cornwall, England

Trelawne House
- Trevelowen (Cornish)
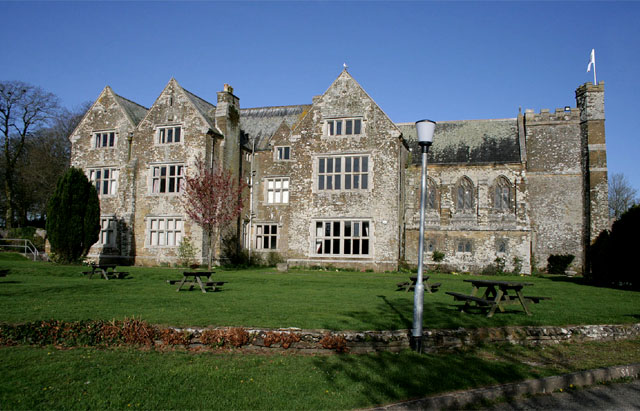

- Location within Cornwall
- 50.3584°N 4.5038°W
- Location: Pelynt, Cornwall, England

Listed Building – Grade II*
- Official name: Trelawne House
- Designated: 27 August 1952
- Reference no.: 1140729

Trelawne (Cornish: Trevelowen, meaning elm-tree homestead) is an historic manor in the parish of Pelynt in Cornwall, England, situated 20 miles (32 km) west of Plymouth, Devon and four miles (6.4 km) west-northwest of Looe, Cornwall. It was long the seat of the Trelawny family, later Trelawny baronets, one of the most eminent of Cornish gentry families, much of whose political power derived from their control of the pocket borough of nearby East Looe. The surviving grade II* listed manor house known as Trelawne House is today used for holiday accommodation and entertainment, under the name "Trelawne Manor Holiday Park".

== Trelawne manor ==
Trelawne manor dates back to Norman times when it was held by Rainald de Vautort. It later passed in turn to the Cardinans, the Chapernouns and the Bonvilles. In 1554 the estate was confiscated from Henry Grey, Duke of Suffolk, the father of Lady Jane Grey and sold in 1600 to Sir Jonathan Trelawny, whose family had originated at Trelawny in Altarnun. It then passed down in the Trelawny and Salusbury-Trelawny families for several generations, many of whom were MPs for the local pocket constituencies of East and West Looe, Sheriffs of Cornwall and Lord-lieutenants of the county. Since John Trelawny, son of the original purchaser, who was created a baronet in 1628, there has been an unbroken series of 14 Trelawny or Salusbury-Trelawny baronets.

== Trelawne House ==
The Grade II* listed house, which includes elements dating from the late 13th century, has been extended and remodelled several times since then. The entrance tower and hall, since remodelled, was built c.1450 for the Bonville family. The west range was added in c.1700 and there were at one time similar ranges to the east and south. After a fire c.1759 a new south east wing was added by Edward Trelawny. In 1860–62 Sir John Trelawny commissioned the rebuilding of the chapel and the south front.

For five years from 1767 to 1772 the house stood empty because the owner, Sir William Trelawny, 6th Baronet, was Governor of Jamaica and there was much debate as to whether the window tax was therefore payable. It was eventually decided that it was.

In the 1960s the estate became a holiday caravan park.

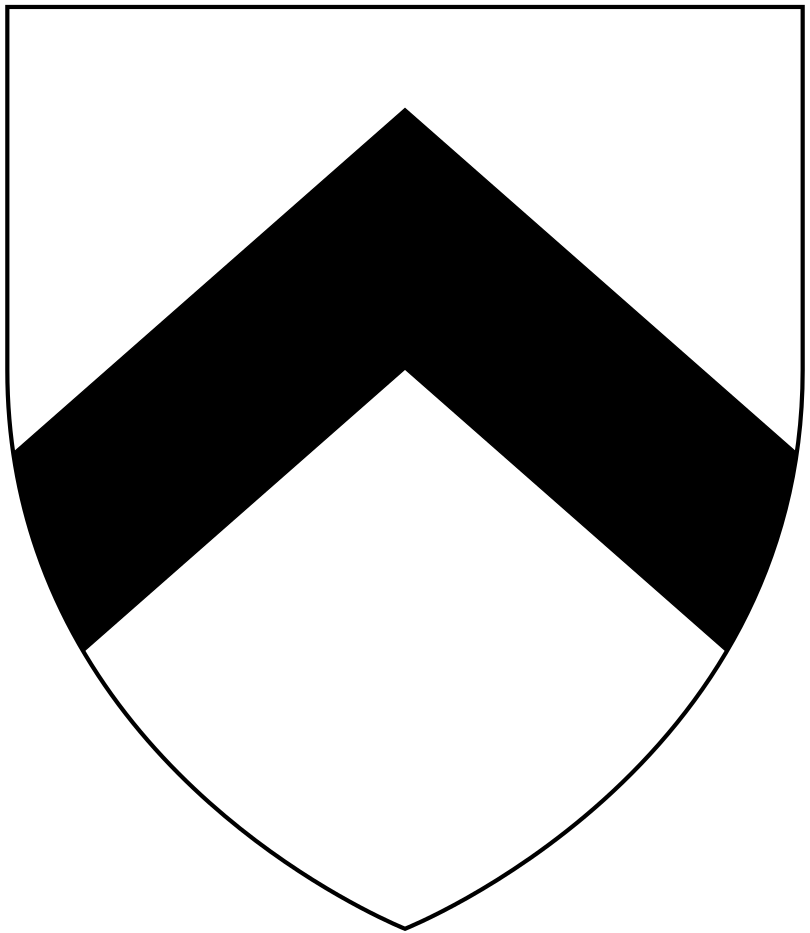
Arms of Trelawny of Trelawne: Argent, a chevron sable
