= Bradley House, Wiltshire =

Country house in Maiden Bradley, Wiltshire, England

Coordinates: 51.1471°N 2.2813°W

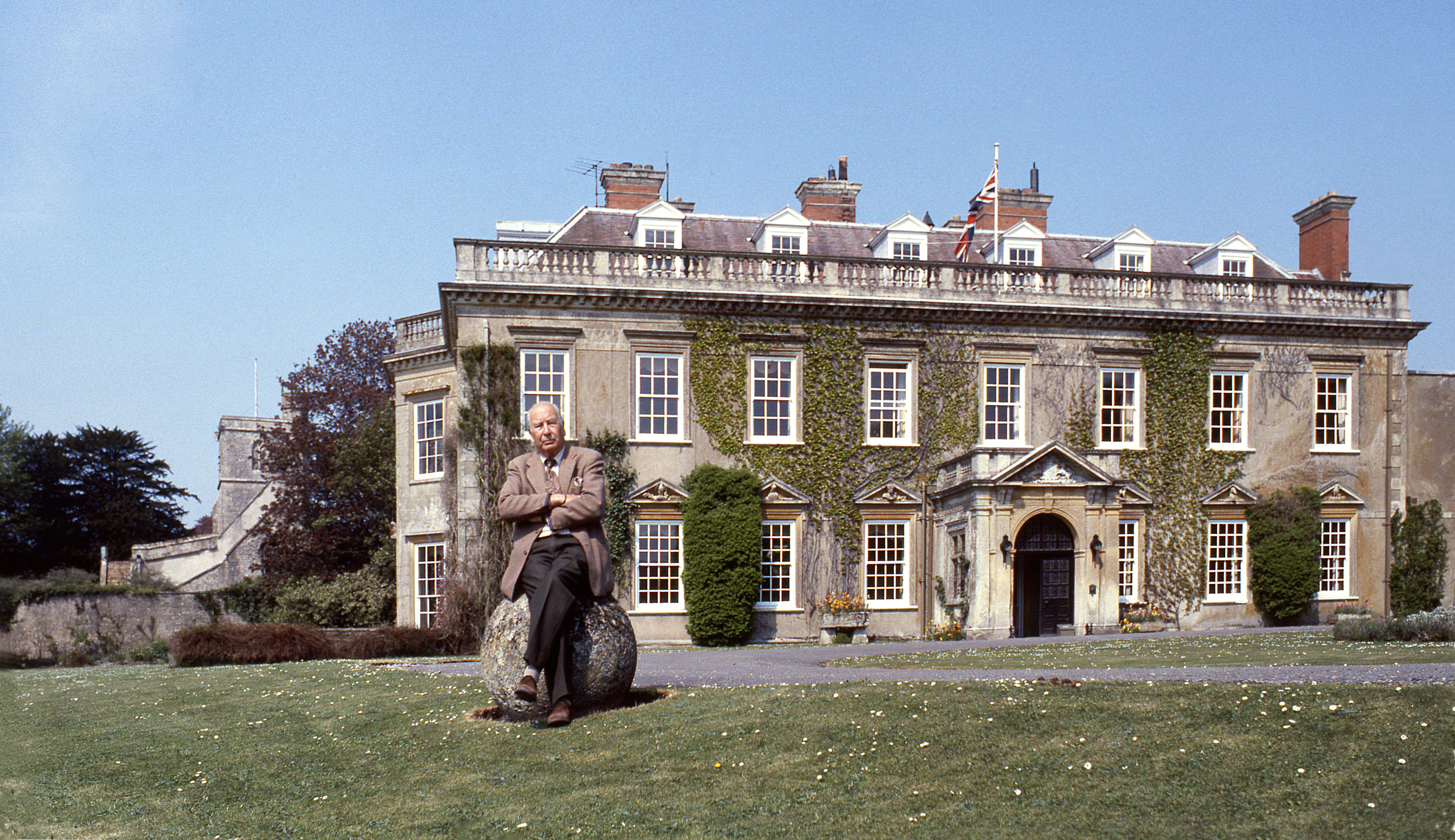
Percy Seymour, 18th Duke of Somerset (1910–1984) in front of his seat, Bradley House; All Saints' Church is visible at left

Bradley House, or Maiden Bradley House, is a country house in the village of Maiden Bradley, Wiltshire, England, between the great country estates of Stourhead and Longleat. It is the family home of the Duke of Somerset, having been in the Seymour family for over 300 years. The house is an 1820s remodelling of the west wing of a much larger house which had been completed in the early 18th century.

Bradley House is listed Grade II on the National Heritage List for England.

== History of the manor ==
According to William Camden, the manor was named after the daughter of Manasser Biset, who during the reign of King Henry II (1154–1189) had found herself infected with leprosy and had founded on the site a hospital for women lepers. This account was dismissed as a fable by Gough and Tanner, who asserted it had been founded by Manasser Bisset himself. In about 1190 it was converted into an Augustinian priory by Hubert, Bishop of Salisbury.

At the dissolution of the monasteries, Henry VIII granted the priory to Edward Seymour, 1st Viscount Beauchamp (c.1500–1552) (later 1st Duke of Somerset and Lord Protector), the eldest brother of his third wife Queen Jane Seymour (d.1537), and mother of the future King Edward VI (1547–1553). It then descended briefly to Edward Seymour, 1st Earl of Hertford (1539–1621), the 1st Duke's eldest surviving son by his second marriage, whom he had made his heir, having suspected the legitimacy of his two sons from his first marriage, John Seymour (1527–1552) and Lord Edward Seymour (1529–1593) of Berry Pomeroy, Devon, whom in 1540 he excluded from their paternal and maternal inheritances with all their claims to their father's dignities being postponed to his children by his second wife. John petitioned parliament for the restoration of his maternal inheritance, but as the lands had been sold, he was awarded compensation in the form of the estate of Maiden Bradley. He did not live to enjoy the grant and died in the Tower of London, having bequeathed the estate with all his other lands and goods to his younger brother Lord Edward Seymour, ancestor of the present Duke of Somerset, whose seat it remains today.

== House ==
Construction of the house was started by Sir Edward Seymour, 3rd Baronet Seymour of Berry Pomeroy (1610–1688). In about 1688 his son Sir Edward Seymour, 4th Baronet abandoned the previous family seat of Berry Pomeroy Castle in Devon, and used the proceeds derived from stripping the castle to fund improvements to the new house at Maiden Bradley. This new Bradley House was completed in about 1710. It was a large building: a plate in Vitruvius Britannicus (1717) shows the seven-bay front elevation with its Baroque doorcase, together with plans of the first and second floors. Wings came forward on the east and west sides of the central part, and behind was a service court, with a stable court beyond.

Sir Edward Seymour, 6th Baronet had inherited the dukedom from a distant cousin in 1750, and thus the house became the seat of the Dukes of Somerset (although for part of the 19th century they made Stover House, Devon, their principal seat). Edward further enlarged the house after 1750.

Much of the house was demolished in 1821–2, leaving only the west wing which was altered and forms the present house, which stands just north-east of the 12th-century parish church. Built in rendered limestone, the 18th-century part (originally just one room deep) has two floors and an attic; it was lengthened from five bays to eight sometime after 1822, and in the same century a rear range and service wing were added. The ground floor windows have pediments, and above the stone cornice a balustraded parapet was added at some point. A bay behind the left end was probably added in 1887, and the central porch – arched and pedimented – is also Victorian. Reception rooms have marble chimney-pieces from the late 18th century, moved from elsewhere and described as "fine" by Orbach.

=== Present day ===
Bradley House remains the home of the Duke of Somerset. Tours are available by prior appointment, and the ground floor and Coach House are marketed as a venue for weddings and other functions.

== Seymour family tombs ==
The Grade I listed All Saints' Church, just south-west of the house, is the principal burial place of the Dukes of Somerset. The church and the family cemetery are connected to the grounds of Bradley House by private access. Members of the Seymour family buried at the church include:

- Sir Edward Seymour, 4th Baronet
- Edward Seymour, 8th Duke of Somerset
- Edward Seymour, 9th Duke of Somerset
- Webb Seymour, 10th Duke of Somerset
- Archibald Seymour, 13th Duke of Somerset
- Edward Seymour, 16th Duke of Somerset
- Evelyn Seymour, 17th Duke of Somerset
- Percy Seymour, 18th Duke of Somerset

Algernon Seymour, 15th Duke of Somerset, and his wife Susan Seymour, are buried on Brimble Hill Clump near Bradley House. Their graves are in a little wood on a hilltop surrounded by agricultural land, with a metal fence around them, and marked by standing rough stones with small text plaques.
