= Duchess of Somerset =

The title Duchess of Somerset, held by the wives of the Dukes of Somerset, may refer to:

- Anne Seymour, Duchess of Somerset (fl. 1512–1587), second wife of Edward Seymour, 1st Duke of Somerset
- Frances Seymour, Duchess of Somerset (1599–1674), second wife of William Seymour, 2nd Duke of Somerset
- Sarah Seymour, Duchess of Somerset (1631–1692), wife of John Seymour, 4th Duke of Somerset
- Elizabeth Seymour, Duchess of Somerset (1667–1722), first wife of Charles Seymour, 6th Duke of Somerset
- Charlotte Seymour, Duchess of Somerset (c. 1693 – 1773), second wife of Charles Seymour, 6th Duke of Somerset
- Frances Seymour, Duchess of Somerset (1699–1754), wife of Algernon Seymour, 7th Duke of Somerset
- Mary Seymour, Duchess of Somerset (1697–1768), wife of Edward Seymour, 8th Duke of Somerset
- Anne Seymour, Duchess of Somerset (fl. 1769–1802), wife of Webb Seymour, 10th Duke of Somerset
- Charlotte Seymour, Duchess of Somerset (1772–1827), first wife of Edward St Maur, 11th Duke of Somerset
- Margaret Seymour, Duchess of Somerset (1805–1880), second wife of Edward St Maur, 11th Duke of Somerset
- Georgiana Seymour, Duchess of Somerset (1809–1884), wife of Edward St Maur, 12th Duke of Somerset
- Horatia Seymour, Duchess of Somerset (1819–1915), wife of Algernon St Maur, 14th Duke of Somerset
- Susan St Maur, Duchess of Somerset (1853–1936), wife of Algernon St Maur, 15th Duke of Somerset
- Rowena Seymour, Duchess of Somerset (1861–1950), wife of Edward Seymour, 16th Duke of Somerset
- Edith Seymour, Duchess of Somerset (fl. 1906–1962), wife of Evelyn Seymour, 17th Duke of Somerset
- Jane Seymour, Duchess of Somerset (1913–2005), wife of Percy Seymour, 18th Duke of Somerset
- Judith-Rose Seymour, Duchess of Somerset, wife of John Seymour, 19th Duke of Somerset
