= Duke of Somerset =

English dukedom

Dukedom of Somerset
- Arms of Seymour: Quarterly: 1st and 4th, Or on a Pile Gules between six Fleurs-de-Lis Azure three Lions of England (being the Augmentation of Honour granted by King Henry VIII on his marriage with Jane Seymour); 2nd and 3rd, Gules two Wings joined in lure the tips downwards Or (Seymour)
- Creation date: 1443 (first creation); 1448 (second creation); 1499 (third creation); 1547 (fourth creation); 1660 (fourth creation, restored)
- Created by: Henry VI (first creation); Henry VI (second creation); Henry VII (third creation); Edward VI (fourth creation); Charles II (fourth creation, restored)
- Peerage: Peerage of England
- First holder: John Beaufort, 3rd Earl of Somerset
- Present holder: John Seymour, 19th Duke of Somerset
- Heir apparent: Sebastian Seymour, Baron Seymour
- Remainder to: the 1st Duke's heirs male of the body lawfully begotten
- Subsidiary titles: Baron Seymour
- Extinction date: 1444 (first creation); 1464 (second creation); 1471 (second creation, titular); 1500 (third creation forfeit)
- Seats: Bradley House; Berry Pomeroy Castle
- Former seat: Bulstrode Park
- Motto: Foy pour devoir (Faith for duty)

Duke of Somerset, from the county of Somerset, is a hereditary title that has been created five times in the Peerage of England. It is particularly associated with two families: the Beauforts, who held the title from the creation of 1448, and the Seymours, from the creation of 1547, in whose name the title is still held. The present dukedom is unique, in that the first holder of the title created it for himself in his capacity of Lord Protector of the Kingdom of England, using a power granted in the will of his brother in law King Henry VIII.

The only subsidiary title of the current duke of Somerset is Baron Seymour of Trowbridge, which is used as a courtesy title by the eldest son and heir of the duke. This courtesy title is the lowest in rank of all heirs to dukedoms in the peerages of the British Isles, yet the holder's precedence is higher than his title suggests, by virtue of the seniority of the Dukedom of Somerset (the only more senior non-royal duke is the Duke of Norfolk).

Several other titles have been held by the dukes of Somerset, but have become extinct. These include:

- Earl of Kendal (created 1443, extinct 1444 but later recreated in France)
- Earl of Somerset (created 1397, forfeit 1461)
- Marquess of Dorset (1st creation 1397, degraded 1399; 2nd creation 1442, forfeit 1461)
- Marquess of Somerset (created 1397, degraded 1399)
- Earl of Dorset (3rd creation 1442, forfeit 1461)
- Viscount Rochester (created 1611, extinct 1645)
- Viscount Beauchamp of Hache (created 1536, forfeit 1552)
- Earl of Hertford (created 1537, forfeit 1552; and created 1559, extinct 1750)
- Marquess of Hertford (created 1640, extinct 1675)
- Baron Seymour of Trowbridge (created 1641, became a subsidiary title 1675, extinct 1750)
- Baron Percy (4th creation 1722, separated 1750)
- Earl of Egremont and Baron Cockermouth (created 1749, separated 1750)
- Earl St. Maur (created 1863, extinct 1885).

== Estates and residences ==
The ducal seat is Bradley House in Maiden Bradley, west Wiltshire, with a secondary estate at Berry Pomeroy Castle, Totnes, Devon. The principal burial place for the Seymour family today is All Saints' Church, Maiden Bradley, adjacent to Bradley House; the church and the family cemetery can be reached from the grounds of Bradley House via private access.

In the 1883 edition of John Bateman's The Great Landowners of Great Britain and Ireland, Edward St Maur, 12th Duke of Somerset's estates were recorded as spanning 25,387 acres across England, including 8,138 acres in Devon, 6,553 acres in Somerset, 5,824 acres in Wiltshire, 2,865 acres in Lincolnshire, 1,640 acres in Buckinghamshire, 289 acres in Cambridgeshire, 32 acres in Norfolk, and 46 acres in Dorset, which produced a combined annual income of £37,577.

=== Previous residences ===
Former country seats occupied by the family include Bulstrode Park in Buckinghamshire, which was purchased from William Bentinck, 4th Duke of Portland by Edward St Maur, 11th Duke of Somerset in 1811. His son Edward Seymour, 12th Duke of Somerset commissioned the present 83,000 sq ft (7,700 m^{2}) mansion, which was completed in 1865. After the 12th Duke's death in 1885 the Dukedom passed to his younger brother Archibald St Maur, 13th Duke of Somerset, whilst the Bulstrode estate passed to 12th Duke's youngest daughter, Lady Helen Ramsden, and then to her son, Sir John Frecheville Ramsden and his descendants.

=== London residences ===
==== Somerset House, The Strand ====
The first member of the Seymour family to hold the Dukedom of Somerset, Edward Seymour, 1st Duke of Somerset commenced construction of Somerset House on The Strand in central London in 1549; however he was attainted for Treason and executed in 1552, prior to the completion of the house. Although the former Tudor mansion (also known as Somerset Place and Old Somerset House) and the current Georgian building complex on this site have retained the name Somerset House, none of the subsequent Dukes of Somerset have resided at this Somerset House.

==== Somerset House, 40 Park Lane ====
In 1808 Edward St Maur, 11th Duke of Somerset purchased the lease of No. 40 Park Lane, Mayfair from Neil Primrose, 3rd Earl of Rosebery, and the house continued to be known as Somerset House, Park Lane until its demolition in 1915, although the freehold of the property was held by the Grosvenor Family. The 11th Duke maintained 40 Park Lane as his London residence until his death in 1855, after which the house was occupied by his widowed second wife Margaret, Duchess of Somerset until her own death in 1880. By April 1881 the 11th Duke's son Edward St Maur, 12th Duke of Somerset had moved into No. 40 Park Lane, which was his London home until he died in 1885. As the 12th Duke had been predeceased by his two sons Ferdinand, Earl of St Maur and Lord Edward Seymour, his successor to the Dukedom was his brother Lord Archibald Seymour. The lease of Somerset House, Park Lane was bequeathed by the 12th Duke to his eldest daughter Lady Hermione Graham (wife of Sir Frederick Graham, 3rd Baronet), who later sold the lease in 1890.

==== 28 Berkeley Square ====
The 13th Duke's London House was No. 28 Berkeley Square from c. 1887, until his death in 1891. after which his leasehold of the property was inherited by his brother Algernon St Maur, 14th Duke of Somerset. The 14th Duke died in 1894 and was succeeded by his oldest son Algernon St Maur, 15th Duke of Somerset; the lease of 28 Berkeley Square passed to the 14th Duke's second son Lord Percy St Maur, and was used as a London house by Lord Percy and his mother Horatia, Dowager Duchess of Somerset. Lord Percy died in 1907, and the leasehold of 28 Berkeley Square then passed to the 14th Duke's third son Lord Ernest St Maur, who relinquished the lease in 1920.

==== Grosvenor Square ====
Algernon St Maur, 15th Duke of Somerset took a long lease of No. 35 Grosvenor Square, Mayfair in 1898. Following his death in 1923 he was succeeded as Duke of Somerset by his third-cousin-once-removed Edward Seymour, 16th Duke of Somerset. The 15th Duke bequeathed his lease of 35 Grosvenor Square and a life annuity of £4,000 to his widow Susan, Duchess of Somerset, and she continued to live at 35 Grosvenor Square until early 1934, after which she leased No. 30 Grosvenor Square until her death in 1936.

== Creation of Empress Matilda ==
William de Mohun of Dunster (?–c. 1155), a favourite of Empress Matilda and a loyal supporter of her in the war against King Stephen (during which he earned the epithet of the "Scourge of the West"), was given the title Earl of Somerset in 1141. In the foundation charter of the priory at Bruton he describes himself as "Willielmus de Moyne, comes Somersetensis". The title was not recognised by Stephen or Henry II (Matilda's son), and his descendants did not use it.

== Beaufort creations ==
Beaufort arms: Royal arms of King Edward III (with France modern) within a bordure compony argent and azure

John Beaufort (1371/1373–1410) was the eldest son from John of Gaunt's marriage to Katherine Swynford. He was created Earl of Somerset on 10 February 1397; on 9 September 1397, following his marriage to Margaret Holland, daughter of Thomas Holland, 2nd Earl of Kent, he was promoted to Marquess of Somerset, and a few weeks later on 29 September 1397 he was created also Marquess of Dorset. However, in 1399, when Henry IV came to the throne, his two marquessates were revoked.

The Commons petitioned the King for his restoration, but Somerset himself objected, stating "the name of marquess is a strange name in this realm". He was succeeded as Earl of Somerset by his son Henry Beaufort (1401–1418), but his early death left the earldom to his brother John Beaufort (1404–1444). He was created Duke of Somerset and Earl of Kendal on 28 August 1443 and died less than a year later on 27 May 1444, perhaps by suicide. The Dukedom of Somerset and Earldom of Kendal became extinct.

The Earldom of Somerset passed to his brother Edmund Beaufort, Count of Mortain (c. 1406–1455). Edmund had been created Earl of Dorset on 18 August 1442 and Marquess of Dorset on 24 June 1443. He was created Duke of Somerset under a new creation on 31 March 1448. Despite this, he is usually referred to as the 2nd Duke of Somerset.

The second duke was killed at the First Battle of St Albans on 22 May 1455 and his peerages passed to his son Henry Beaufort (1436–1464) who had been known as the Earl of Dorset since his father's creation as Duke of Somerset. After the defeat at the battle of Towton on 29 March 1461 he fled to Scotland and was attainted on 4 November 1461. All his honours and estates were declared forfeit. His titles were restored to him on 10 March 1463 but he deserted the king and was captured and beheaded after the battle of Hexham on 15 May 1464.

He was unmarried, but his illegitimate son Charles Somerset became the 1st Earl of Worcester. Henry's titles were forfeited by act of Parliament; but his brother Edmund Beaufort (c. 1439–1471) was styled Duke of Somerset by the Lancastrians. After the Battle of Tewkesbury on 4 May 1471 he fled and took refuge in Tewkesbury Abbey. He was beheaded by the Yorkists, and buried in the abbey church. Upon his death the house of Beaufort became extinct in the legitimate line.

== Tudor creations ==
In 1499 Henry VII nominated his infant son Edmund Tudor to the dukedom of Somerset at his baptism, but the child, just over a year old when he died, was probably never formally created a peer.

The illegitimate son of Henry VIII, Henry FitzRoy (1519–1536), by Elizabeth Blount, was created Earl of Nottingham, and Duke of Richmond and Somerset on 18 June 1525. He died without heirs on 23 July 1536, when his peerages became extinct.

== Earl of Somerset under James VI and I ==
Robert Carr (c. 1587–1645), born Kerr/Ker, son of Sir Thomas Ker of Ferniehirst, became a favourite of King James VI and I. On 25 March 1611 he was created Viscount Rochester, and subsequently a privy councillor. On the death of Lord Salisbury in 1612 he began to act as the king's secretary. On 3 November 1613 he was created Earl of Somerset. He died in July 1645, leaving a daughter, Anne. His titles became extinct.

== Seymour creation and 17th century claim to revert to Beaufort creations ==
Arms of Seymour: Gules, two wings conjoined in lure or

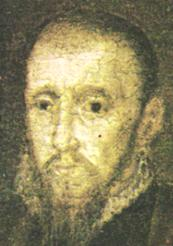
Edward Seymour, 1st Duke of Somerset

Edward Seymour, 1st Duke of Somerset (c. 1500–1552), was the eldest brother of Jane Seymour, the third wife of King Henry VIII, and was thus an uncle of King Edward VI. Henry had created him Viscount Beauchamp "of Hache" in 1536, at the time of the marriage, and Earl of Hertford in 1537. On the death of Henry VIII on 28 January 1547, Seymour was named in the King's will as one of his sixteen executors who then formed a regency council to rule during the minority of his nine-year-old son and successor King Edward VI. Seymour was elected head of the council, which on 1 February 1547 appointed him as "Lord Protector of the Realm and Governor of the King's Person", when he became "the most powerful man in England, a king in all but name" and ruled by proclamation. On 17 February 1547 the Council created him "Duke of Somerset", which reflected his ancient title as feudal baron of Hatch in Somerset, centred on the manor of Hatch Beauchamp, inherited by his ancestor Roger Seymour (d.c.1361) from his marriage to Cecily Beauchamp (d. 1393), the aunt and heiress of John IV de Beauchamp, 3rd Baron Beauchamp (1330–1361). On 10 August 1547 he obtained royal letters patent to bear the augmented coat of arms previously granted in 1536 by Henry VIII to Jane Seymour. Edward Seymour married twice; in about 1535 he divorced his first wife, Catherine Fillol, disowning her and her children, and married Anne Stanhope who bore him nine children. The patent of the dukedom specified that it was to descend to his issue by his second wife Anne Stanhope, thus excluding his eldest son by his first wife from the title, except in case of the failure of male heirs from the junior line. In 1547 he bought Berry Pomeroy Castle in Devon from Sir Thomas Pomeroy, although he probably never visited it, and it became the seat of his eldest son from his first marriage, Edward Seymour (1527/1535–1593), whose son was made a baronet "of Berry Pomeroy". On the failure of the junior male line in 1750, Sir Edward Seymour, 6th Baronet of Berry Pomeroy became the 8th Duke of Somerset, as the patent allowed, and his descendants, seated at Maiden Bradley House in Wiltshire, continue to bear the title today.

Less than two years after losing his position as Lord Protector, his titles were forfeited and he was beheaded on 22 January 1552. He was replaced in the minority government of Edward VI by John Dudley, Duke of Northumberland, whose pragmatic style contrasted with Seymour's mixture of idealism and arrogance.

In 1644 Charles I granted the earldom of Glamorgan to Edward Somerset (1613–1667). He was a descendant of Charles Somerset, the illegitimate son of Henry Beaufort, 3rd Duke of Somerset. In return for obtaining military help from Ireland he promised Edward the title of Duke of Somerset. Under the Commonwealth Edward was banished from England and his estates were seized. At the Restoration his estates were restored, and he claimed the dukedom of Somerset as promised to him by Charles I. However, this claim was rejected by the House of Lords, and so was the title of Earl of Glamorgan. This enabled King Charles II to restore the ducal title to the fourth creation family, the Seymours, who descend from the country's de facto regent, the lord protector in 1547.

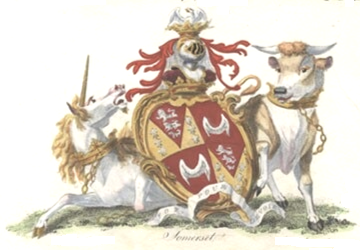
Coat of Arms of the Seymour Dukes of Somerset. Crest: Out of a ducal coronet or a demi-phoenix in flames proper. Supporters: dexter: A unicorn argent armed unguled and crined or gorged with a ducal coronet per pale azure and or and chained of the last; sinister: A bull azure armed unguled ducally gorged and chained or

Edward Seymour (1538–1621) was son and heir of Edward Seymour, 1st Duke of Somerset, from his second marriage. He was created the Earl of Hertford in 1559 under Elizabeth I. His grandson William Seymour (1588–1660) secretly married Lady Arbella Stuart (1575–1615) on 22 June 1610. She was the niece of Henry Stuart, Lord Darnley, first cousin of James I and bar for James's children next in succession to Scottish and English thrones. Both William and Arabella were imprisoned but managed to escape. William fled to Paris, but Arbella was recaptured. She was imprisoned in the Tower of London where she died in 1615. William returned to England shortly after her death and inherited his father's titles in 1621. Charles I received his support and made him Marquess of Hertford in 1640 and on 13 September 1660, shortly before his death on 24 October, the title of Duke of Somerset was restored to him as its legitimate heir, following its non-existence for 108 years. He outlived his three eldest sons and as the dukedom descends to heirs male of the holder of the 1547 grant it passed to William Seymour (1654–1671) who was the son of the third son mentioned (lived 1626–1654). The 3rd duke died unmarried and the title passed to John Seymour (bef. 1646–1675) the last surviving son of the 2nd Duke, his uncle. On his death without issue on 29 April 1675 only the Marquessate of Hertford became extinct. His distant cousin Francis Seymour, 3rd Baron Seymour of Trowbridge (1658–1678) became 5th Duke of Somerset. Francis was the eldest surviving son of Charles Seymour (1621–1665), whose father Sir Francis Seymour (c. 1590–1664), a younger brother of the 2nd Duke of Somerset, had been created Baron Seymour of Trowbridge in 1641.

When the 5th Duke died unmarried in 1678, the title passed to his brother, Charles Seymour (1662–1748), youngest son of the 2nd Baron Trowbridge. The 6th Duke, known as "the Proud Duke", was a favourite of Queen Anne. He first married Lady Elizabeth Percy, daughter of Joceline Percy, 11th Earl of Northumberland (1644–1670). She died in 1722 and in 1725 he married Lady Charlotte Finch (1711–1773), daughter of Daniel Finch, 2nd Earl of Nottingham. The 6th duke died 2 December 1748, at Petworth House, Sussex aged 86, when his son from his first marriage Algernon Seymour (1684–1750) inherited the peerages and estates.

Later subsidiary titles

Algernon Seymour had been created Baron Percy in 1722. In 1749, soon after succeeding his father as 7th Duke of Somerset, he was created Earl of Northumberland, the Earldom of Northumberland having become extinct with the death of his maternal grandfather in 1670. By a special remainder, the new earldom was to pass to Sir Hugh Smithson, husband of Algernon's daughter Elizabeth Seymour (died 1776), while the subsidiary peerages of Baron Cockermouth and Earl of Egremont were to go to the children of his sister Lady Catherine Seymour (1693–1731). Without male issue, on his death in February 1750 these peerages therefore passed to different families, in accordance with the remainders in the patents of their creation. The earldom of Hertford, the barony of Beauchamp, and the barony of Seymour of Trowbridge became extinct; and the dukedom of Somerset, together with the barony of Seymour, devolved on a distant Seymour cousin.

Later descent

Sir Edward Seymour, 6th baronet of Berry Pomeroy (1694–1757) became the 8th Duke of Somerset in 1750. The 1st baronet was (Sir) Edward Seymour (1556–1613), son of Edward Seymour (1527/1535–1593) who was the 1st Duke's eldest son and of Catherine Seymour (née Filliol). He was a seventh-generation descendant of the 1st Duke. The 4th Baronet had been speaker of the House of Commons during the reign of Charles II and he moved the principal family seat from Berry Pomeroy Castle in Devon to Bradley House in Maiden Bradley.

Upon this Duke's death, he was succeeded by his eldest son Edward Seymour (1717–1792). He died unmarried and was succeeded by his brother Webb Seymour (1718–1793) who became the 10th Duke. His son Edward Adolphus Seymour (1775–1855) was a notable mathematician and became the 11th Duke upon his father's death. He changed the spelling of the family name from Seymour to St. Maur, but the pronunciation was unchanged, and both spellings remained in use.

== 12th Duke and sons, the Earls St. Maur ==
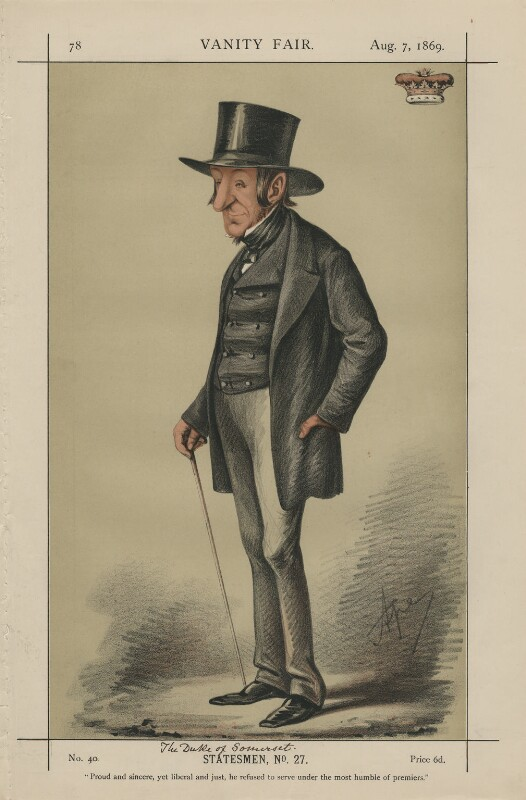
Edward Seymour

The 11th Duke was succeeded by his eldest son Edward Adolphus Seymour (1804–1885) who was created Earl St. Maur, of Berry Pomeroy in 1863. His eldest son who predeceased him Edward A. F. Seymour (1835–1869) was known as Lord Seymour until 1863 as a courtesy title he adopted Earl St. Maur. Commonly known as Ferdy, he was an adventurer who joined Garibaldi's army under the assumed name of Capt. Richard Sarsfield. In 1866 he began a relationship with a 17-year-old maid called Rosina Swan. The Earl took Rosina with him during his travels, returning to England with her in 1868 to live near Brighton. Ferdy and Rosina had two children; a girl named Ruth (1867–1953) was born whilst the couple were in Tangier and a boy named Richard 'Harold' St. Maur (1869–1927) was born in Brighton shortly before the death of his father. Had the Earl married Rosina, Harold would have been the heir to his grandfather's dukedom and for this reason Harold tried to find proof that the couple had married whilst they were living in the Netherlands, offering reward of £50 (equal to about £6,000 today) for evidence to support the claim, but was unsuccessful.

== 13th–19th dukes ==
The 12th Duke died on 28 December 1885 aged 81 outliving both of his sons with no legitimate male heirs and the title passed to his aged unmarried brother Archibald Henry Algernon Seymour (1810–1891). When he died a few years later, the youngest brother Algernon Percy Banks St. Maur (1813–1894) became the 14th Duke. Three and a half years later he was dead. His son Algernon Seymour (1846–1923) became the 15th Duke.

He died without children and the title passed to his distant cousin Edward Hamilton Seymour (1860–1931), great-great-grandson of Lord Francis Seymour, Dean of Wells (1726–1799), youngest son of the 8th Duke. He was succeeded by his son Evelyn Francis Seymour (1882–1954) who passed the title on to his son Percy Hamilton Seymour (1910–1984). The title is currently held by his son John Michael Edward Seymour who was born in 1952. The current heir to the title is Sebastian Seymour, Lord Seymour who was born in 1982.

== Arms ==
Coat of arms of Duke of Somerset
Coronet That of a Duke Crest Out of a Coronet Or a Phoenix of the Last issuing from Flames Proper Escutcheon Quarterly: 1st and 4th, Or on a Pile Gules between six Fleurs-de-Lis Azure three Lions of England (being the Augmentation of Honour granted by King Henry VIII on his marriage with Jane Seymour); 2nd and 3rd, Gules two Wings joined in lure the tips downwards Or (Seymour) Supporters Dexter: a Unicorn Argent armed maned and tufted Or gorged with a Coronet per pale Azure and Or to which is affixed a Chain of the Last; Sinister: a Bull Azure gorged with a Coronet chained hoofed and armed Or Motto FOY POUR DEVOIR (Middle French for FAITH FOR DUTY)

== List of earls, marquesses, and dukes ==
=== Earls of Somerset, first creation (1141) ===
- William de Mohun of Dunster (d. c. 1155), Earl of Somerset whose descendants have never claimed the title

=== Earls of Somerset, second creation (1397) ===
- John Beaufort (1371/1373–1410), 1st Earl of Somerset, eldest legitimated son of John of Gaunt, Duke of Lancaster

=== Marquesses of Somerset (1397) ===
- John Beaufort (1371/1373–1410), 1st Earl of Somerset, 1st Marquess of Dorset was created Marquess later the same year for his role as a counter-appellant

=== Earls of Somerset, second creation (1397; reverted) ===
- John Beaufort (c. 1373–1410), 1st Earl of Somerset, lost his marquessates when Henry IV acceded in 1399
- Henry Beaufort (1401–1418), 2nd Earl of Somerset, eldest son of the 1st Earl
- John Beaufort (1404–1444), 3rd Earl of Somerset, 1st Duke of Somerset, brother of preceding, created Duke of Somerset in 1443 (see below)
- Edmund Beaufort (c. 1406–1455), 4th Earl of Somerset, 2nd Duke of Somerset, brother of preceding, raised to a dukedom in 1448 (see below)

=== Dukes of Somerset, first creation (1443) ===
- John Beaufort (1404–1444), 1st Duke of Somerset, died without male issue, when his dukedom became extinct

=== Dukes of Somerset, second creation (1448) ===
Often numbered 2nd – 4th to include John, the brother of the Edmund, whose title was nonetheless technically extinct

- Edmund Beaufort (c. 1406–1455), 2nd Duke of Somerset, became Duke of Somerset in 1448
- Henry Beaufort (1436–1464), 3rd Duke of Somerset, eldest son of Edmund, whose titles were forfeit from 1461 to 1463
- Edmund Beaufort (c. 1438–1471), 4th Duke of Somerset, second son of Edmund, sometimes considered a Duke, but was so styled by Lancastrians (see article for details)

=== Duke of Somerset, third creation (1499) ===
- Edmund Tudor (1499–1500), Duke of Somerset, third son of Henry VII, died in infancy

=== Duke of Richmond and Somerset (1525) ===
- Henry FitzRoy (1519–1536), Duke of Richmond and Somerset, illegitimate son of Henry VIII, died without issue

=== Dukes of Somerset, fourth creation (1547) ===
- Edward Seymour (c. 1500–1552), 1st Duke of Somerset, uncle to and Lord Protector of Edward VI, was deposed and executed and his titles forfeit in 1552.

=== Earls of Somerset, third creation (1613) ===
- Robert Carr (c. 1590–1645), Earl of Somerset, a favourite of James VI and I, died without issue

=== Dukes of Somerset, fourth creation restored (1660) ===
- William Seymour (1588–1660), 2nd Duke of Somerset, great-grandson of the 1st Duke through the 1st Duke's third son, Edward Seymour, 1st Earl of Hertford, and a Cavalier, was rewarded with restoration to the dukedom soon after the Stuart Restoration
  - William Seymour (1621–1642), styled Lord Beauchamp, eldest son of the 2nd Duke, predeceased his father unmarried
  - Robert Seymour (1622–1646), styled Lord Beauchamp, second son of the 2nd Duke, predeceased his father unmarried
  - Henry Seymour (1626–1654), styled Lord Beauchamp, third son of the 2nd Duke, predeceased his father
- William Seymour (1650–1671), 3rd Duke of Somerset, only son of Henry Seymour, Lord Beauchamp, died without issue
- John Seymour (bef. 1646–1675), 4th Duke of Somerset, fourth and youngest son of the 2nd Duke, died without issue
- Francis Seymour (1658–1678), 5th Duke of Somerset, great-grandson of Edward Seymour, Viscount Beauchamp through the Lords Seymour of Trowbridge; himself eldest son of the 1st Duke's fourth son; Edward Seymour, 1st Earl of Hertford; died without issue
- Charles Seymour (1662–1748), 6th Duke of Somerset, "The Proud Duke", younger brother of the 5th Duke
- Algernon Seymour (1684–1750), 7th Duke of Somerset, eldest son of the 6th Duke
  - George Seymour (1725–1744), styled Viscount Beauchamp, only son of the 7th Duke, predeceased his father without issue
- Edward Seymour (1695–1757), 8th Duke of Somerset, great-great-great-grandson of Sir Edward Seymour, 1st Baronet of the Seymour Baronets of Berry Pomeroy; himself only son of the 1st Duke's second son having male issue; Sir Edward Seymour, of Berry Pomeroy
- Edward Seymour (1717–1792), 9th Duke of Somerset, eldest son of the 8th Duke
- Webb Seymour (1718–1793), 10th Duke of Somerset, second son of the 8th Duke
- Edward Adolphus St Maur (1775–1855), 11th Duke of Somerset, eldest son of the 10th Duke
- Edward Adolphus Seymour (1804–1885), 12th Duke of Somerset, eldest son of the 11th Duke
  - Edward Adolphus Ferdinand Seymour (1835–1869), styled Earl St Maur, eldest son of the 12th Duke, predeceased his father without legitimate issue
- Archibald Algernon Henry Seymour (1810–1891), 13th Duke of Somerset, second son of the 11th Duke, died without issue
- Algernon Percy Banks St Maur (1813–1894), 14th Duke of Somerset, third and youngest son of the 11th Duke
- Algernon St Maur (1846–1923), 15th Duke of Somerset, eldest son of the 14th Duke, died without issue
- Edward Hamilton Seymour (1860–1931), 16th Duke of Somerset, great-great-grandson of the Very Reverend Lord Francis Seymour, fourth and youngest son of the 8th Duke
- Evelyn Francis Edward Seymour (1882–1954), 17th Duke of Somerset, only son of the 16th Duke
  - Francis William Seymour (1906–1907), eldest son of the 17th Duke, died in infancy
  - Algernon Francis Edward Seymour (1908–1911), second son of the 17th Duke, died young
- Percy Hamilton Seymour (1910–1984), 18th Duke of Somerset, third and youngest son of the 17th Duke
- John Michael Edward Seymour (b. 1952), 19th Duke of Somerset, eldest son of the 18th Duke

The heir apparent is the present holder's eldest son Sebastian Edward Seymour, Lord Seymour (b. 1982).

=== Earls St Maur (1863 creation) ===
- Edward Adolphus Seymour (1804–1885), 12th Duke of Somerset, Earl St Maur, was created Earl St Maur (pronounced "Seemer") in the peerage of the United Kingdom when already Duke of Somerset, in order to provide a more senior courtesy title for his heir.
  - Edward Adolphus Ferdinand Seymour (1835–1869), styled Earl St Maur, the eldest son of the 12th Duke, in the event was the only man called "Earl St Maur", as he and his younger brother both died unmarried. In 1885, when the Dukedom reverted to his uncle, the earldom became extinct.

== Succession to the Dukedom ==
- Percy Seymour, 18th Duke of Somerset (1910–1984)
  - John Seymour, 19th Duke of Somerset (born 1952)
    - (1). Sebastian Edward, Lord Seymour (b. 1982)
      - (2). Hon. Louis Francis Edward Seymour (b. 2026)
    - (3). Lord Charles Thomas George Seymour (b. 1992)
  - (4). Lord Francis Charles Edward Seymour (b. 1956)
    - (5). Webb Edward Percy Seymour (b. 1990)

After those in the above immediate line of succession, the Marquess of Hertford and his legitimate male heirs and relations in the senior male line of the Seymour dynasty are next in line to the dukedom.

== Family trees ==
Peerage family tree of the Dukes of Beaufort, Lancaster, and Somerset and subsidiary titles

Earl of Dorset (possibly 1st creation), 1070
Roger de Beaumont c. 1015–1094	Saint Osmund d. 1099; Bishop of Salisbury and possibly Earl of Dorset
Earl of Dorset (1st creation) discontinued, 1099
Earl of Leicester (1st creation), 1107
King Henry I c. 1068–1135	King Stephen; 1092/1096–1154	Robert de Beaumont c. 1040/1050–1118; 1st Earl of Leicester	Henry de Beaumont d. 1119; Earl of Warwick
Earl of Worcester (1st creation), 1138
Robert FitzRoy c. 1090–1147; Earl of Gloucester	Matilda (d. bef. 1141)	Waleran de Beaumont; 1104–1166; Earl of Worcester	Robert de Beaumont; 1104–1168; 2nd Earl of Leicester	Hugh de Beaumont b. 1106; Earl of Bedford
Earldom of Worcester (1st creation) extinct, 1166
William FitzRobert; 1116–1183; Earl of Gloucester	Hawise de Beaumont	Robert de Beaumont d. 1190; 3rd Earl of Leicester
Robert de Beaumont d. 1204; 4th Earl of Leicester	Amice; Countess of Rochefort
King John; 1166–1216	Isabella; 1173/1174–1217; Countess of Gloucester	Simon de Montfort c. 1175–1218; 5th Earl of Leicester
King Henry III; 1207–1272	Eleanor of England	Simon de Montfort c. 1208–1265; 6th Earl of Leicester
Earldom of Leicester (1st creation) forfeited, 1265
Earl of Leicester (2nd creation), 1267; Earl of Lancaster, 1276
King Edward I 1239–1307	Edmund Crouchback; 1245–1296; 1st Earl of Leicester, 1st Earl of Lancaster
Earldom of Leicester (2nd creation) restored, 1324; Earldom of Lancaster restored, 1327
King Edward II; 1284–1327	Thomas of Lancaster; 1278–1322; 2nd Earl of Leicester, 2nd Earl of Lancaster	Henry of Lancaster; 1281–1345; 3rd Earl of Leicester, 3rd Earl of Lancaster
Earldom of Leicester (2nd creation) and Earldom of Lancaster forfeited, 1322
Duke of Lancaster, 1351
King Edward III; 1312–1377	Henry of Grosmont c. 1310–1361; Duke of Lancaster, 4th Earl of Lancaster, 4th Earl of Leicester	Joan of Lancaster c. 1312–1349 m. John (II) de Mowbray; 1310–1361; Baron Mowbray	Eleanor of Lancaster; 1318–1372	Mary of Lancaster c. 1320–1362
Earl of Worcester (2nd creation), 1397
John of Gaunt; 1340–1399; Duke of Lancaster, 5th Earl of Lancaster, (6th) Earl of Leicester jure uxoris Earl of Richmond	Blanche of Lancaster; 1342–1368; 5th Countess of Lancaster, (6th) Countess of Leicester	Maud of Lancaster; 1340–1362 a.k.a. Matilda, Countess of Hainault	William; 1330–1389; Duke of Bavaria and Count of Holland, (5th) Earl of Leicester jure uxoris	Richard Fitzalan; 1346–1397; Earl of Arundel	Thomas Percy; 1343–1403; Earl of Worcester
Earldom of Worcester (2nd creation) extinct, 1403
Eleanor Mowbray d. bef. 1387 m. Roger La Warr; 1326–1370
Earl of Somerset (1st creation), 1397; Marquess of Somerset and Marquess of Dorset (1st creation), 1397	Earl of Dorset (2nd creation), 1411
Henry Bolingbroke; 1367–1413; Duke of Lancaster, (7th) Earl of Leicester later King Henry IV	John Beaufort c. 1373–1410; Marquess of Somerset, Marquess of Dorset, 1st Earl of Somerset	Thomas Beaufort c. 1377–1426; Duke of Exeter, Earl of Dorset	Joan Beaufort c. 1379–1440	Joan La Warr m. Thomas West; 1365–1405; Baron West	Joan de Beauchamp; 1375–1435
Earldom of Leicester (2nd creation) and Dukedom of Lancaster merged into the Crown, 1399	Marquessate of Somerset and Marquessate of Dorset (1st creation) revoked, 1399	Earldom of Dorset (2nd creation) extinct, 1426
Duke of Lancaster, 1399	Earl of Worcester (3rd creation), 1421
Henry of Monmouth; 1386–1422; Duke of Lancaster later King Henry V	Richard Beauchamp; 1394–c. 1422; Earl of Worcester	Reginald West; 1395–1450; Baron De La Warr and Baron West
Dukedom of Lancaster merged into the Crown, 1413	Earldom of Worcester (3rd creation) extinct, 1422
Duke of Somerset (1st creation), 1443	Earl of Dorset (3rd creation), 1442; Marquess of Dorset (2nd creation), 1443; Duke of Somerset (2nd creation), 1448
Henry Beaufort; 1401–1418; 2nd Earl of Somerset	John Beaufort; 1404–1444; 1st Duke of Somerset, 3rd Earl of Somerset	Edmund Beaufort; 1406–1455; 2nd Duke of Somerset, 1st Marquess of Dorset, etc., 4th Earl of Somerset	Richard Neville; 1400–1460; Earl of Salisbury	Edward Neville d. 1476; Baron Bergavenny	Elizabeth Beauchamp; 1415–1448	Richard West; 1430–1476; Baron De La Warr, Baron West
Dukedom of Somerset (1st creation) extinct, 1444
Claimed titles here are disputed	Earl of Worcester (4th creation), 1449
Margaret Beaufort; 1443–1509	Elizabeth Woodville c. 1437–1492	Henry Beaufort; 1436–1464; 3rd Duke of Somerset, 2nd Marquess of Dorset, 5th Earl of Dorset	Edmund Beaufort c. 1438–1471; 4th Duke of Somerset, 3rd Marquess of Dorset, 6th Earl of Dorset	Cecily Neville c. 1425–1450	John Tiptoft; 1427–1470; 1st Earl of Worcester
Dukedom of Somerset (2nd creation), Marquessate of Dorset (2nd creation), and Earldom of Dorset attained, 1461, but possibly restored (disputed), 1463	Dukedom of Somerset (2nd creation), Marquessate of Dorset (2nd creation), and Earldom of Dorset extinct, 1471	Earldom of Worcester (4th creation) attainted, 1470
Thomas West c. 1457–1525; Baron De La Warr, Baron West
Marquess of Dorset (3rd creation), 1475	Earl of Worcester (5th creation), 1514	Earl of Worcester (4th creation) restored, 1471
Margery Wentworth c. 1478–1550	King Henry VII; 1457–1509	Elizabeth of York; 1466–1503	Thomas Grey; 1451–1501; 1st Marquess of Dorset	Charles Somerset c. 1460–1526; 1st Earl of Worcester	Elizabeth Somerset c. 1476–1507; 3rd Baroness Herbert suo jure	Edward Tiptoft c. 1469–1485; 2nd Earl of Worcester	Eleanor West b. 1481 m. Edward Guildford c. 1474–1534
Earldom of Worcester (4th creation) extinct, 1485
Viscount Beauchamp "of Hache" (1st creation), 1536; Earl of Hertford (2nd creation), 1537; Duke of Somerset (4th creation), 1547	Duke of Somerset (3rd creation), 1499
Edward Seymour c. 1500–1552; Duke of Somerset, Earl of Hertford, etc.	Jane Seymour c. 1508–1537	King Henry VIII; 1491–1547	Thomas Grey; 1477–1530; 2nd Marquess of Dorset	Henry Somerset c. 1495–1548; 2nd Earl of Worcester, 4th Baron Herbert	Mary Tudor; 1496–1533; Queen of France; Duchess of Suffolk	Edmund Tudor; 1499–1500; 1st Duke of Somerset	Jane Guildford c. 1508/1509–1555 m. John Dudley; 1504–1553; Duke of Northumberland
Dukedom of Somerset (4th creation), Earldom of Hertford (2nd creation), and Viscountcy Beauchamp (1st creation) forfeit, 1552	Dukedom of Somerset (3rd creation) extinct, 1500
Duke of Richmond and Somerset, 1525
King Edward VI; 1537–1553	Henry Fitzroy; 1519–1536; 1st Duke of Richmond and Somerset	Henry Grey; 1517–1554; Duke of Suffolk, 3rd Marquess of Dorset	Frances Brandon; 1517–1559; Duchess of Suffolk
Dukedom of Richmond and Somerset extinct, 1536	Marquessate of Dorset (3rd creation) attainted and honours forfeit, 1554
Earl of Hertford (3rd creation) and Viscount Beauchamp "of Hache" (2nd creation), 1559	Earl of Leicester (3rd creation), 1564	Baron Buckhurst (1st creation), 1567; Earl of Dorset (4th creation), 1604
Edward Seymour c. 1528–1593	Edward Seymour; 1539–1621; Earl of Hertford, etc.	Katherine Grey; 1540–1568	William Somerset c. 1526–1589; 3rd Earl of Worcester, 5th Baron Herbert	John Dudley c. 1527–1554; Earl of Warwick	Robert Dudley; 1532–1588; 1st Earl of Leicester	Mary Dudley c. 1530–1586 m. Henry Sidney	Guildford Dudley c. 1535–1554	Jane Grey; 1537–1554; Disputed Queen of England	Thomas Sackville; 1536–1608; 1st Earl of Dorset, etc.
Earldom of Hertford (3rd creation) forfeit, 1552	Earldom of Leicester (3rd creation) extinct, 1588
Seymour baronets, of Berry Pomeroy, 1611	Earl of Leicester (4th creation), 1618
Edward Seymour c. 1563–1613; 1st Baronet	Edward Seymour; 1561–1612; Viscount Beauchamp	Edward Somerset; 1553–1628; 4th Earl of Worcester, 6th Baron Herbert	Philip Sidney; 1554–1586	Mary Sidney; 1561–1621	Robert Sidney; 1563–1626; 1st Earl of Leicester	Robert Sackville; 1561–1609; 2nd Earl of Dorset, etc.
Marquess of Hertford (1st creation), 1641; Duke of Somerset (4th creation restored), 1660	Baron Seymour of Trowbridge, 1641	Marquess of Worcester, 1642	Viscount Somerset of Cashel, 1626	Viscount Rochester, 1611; Earl of Somerset (3rd creation), 1613
Edward Seymour c. 1580–1659; 2nd Baronet	William Seymour; 1588–1660; 2nd Duke of Somerset, 1st Marquess of Hertford, 2nd Earl of Hertford	Francis Seymour c. 1590–1664; 1st Lord Seymour of Trowbridge	Henry Somerset; 1577–1646; 1st Marquess of Worcester, 5th Earl of Worcester, 7th Baron Herbert	Thomas Somerset; 1579–1651; Viscount Somerset	Robert Sidney; 1595–1677; 2nd Earl of Leicester	Richard Sackville; 1589–1624; 3rd Earl of Dorset, etc.	Edward Sackville; 1591–1652; 4th Earl of Dorset, etc.	Robert Carr c. 1587–1645; Earl of Somerset, etc.
Viscountcy Somerset extinct, 1651	Earldom of Somerset (3rd creation) and Viscountcy Rochester extinct, 1645
Edward Seymour; 1610–1688; 3rd Baronet	Henry Seymour c. 1626–1654; Lord Beauchamp	Charles Seymour c. 1621–1665; 2nd Lord Seymour of Trowbridge	Edward Somerset; 1601–1667; 2nd Marquess of Worcester, 6th Earl of Worcester, 8th Baron Herbert	Philip Sidney; 1619–1698; 3rd Earl of Leicester	Algernon Sidney; 1623–1683	Lucy Sidney; 1630–1685	Henry Sidney; 1641–1704; Earl of Romney	Richard Sackville; 1522–1677; 5th Earl of Dorset, etc.
Duke of Beaufort, 1682	Baron Cranfield, 1674; Earl of Middlesex (2nd creation), 1675
Edward Seymour; 1633–1708; 4th Baronet	William Seymour; 1650–1671; 3rd Duke of Somerset, 2nd Marquess of Hertford, 3rd Earl of Hertford	John Seymour c. 1646–1675; 4th Duke of Somerset, 3rd Marquess of Hertford, 4th Earl of Hertford	Francis Seymour; 1658–1678; 5th Duke of Somerset, 3rd Lord Seymour of Trowbridge	Charles Seymour; 1662–1748; 6th Duke of Somerset	Henry Somerset; 1629–1700; 1st Duke of Beaufort, 3rd Marquess of Worcester, 7th Earl of Worcester, 9th Baron Herbert	Robert Sidney; 1649–1702; 4th Earl of Leicester	Thomas Pelham; 1653–1712	Charles Sackville; 1522–1677; 6th Earl of Dorset, etc., 1st Earl of Middlesex, etc.
Marquessate of Hertford (1st creation) extinct, 1675
Baron Conway of Ragley, 1703; Baron Conway of Killultagh, 1712	Duke of Dorset, 1720
Edward Seymour; 1663–1740; 5th Baronet	Francis Seymour-Conway; 1679–1732; 1st Baron Conway	Edward Coke d. 1707	Algernon Seymour; 1684–1750; 7th Duke of Somerset, Earl of Northumberland	Charles Somerset; 1660–1698 styled Marquess of Worcester	Philip Sidney; 1676–1705; 5th Earl of Leicester	John Sidney; 1680–1737; 6th Earl of Leicester	Jocelyn Sidney; 1682–1743; 7th Earl of Leicester	Elizabeth Pelham; 1681–1711	Lionel Sackville; 1688–1765; 1st Duke of Dorset, 7th Earl of Dorset, etc., 2nd Earl of Middlesex, etc.
Earldom of Leicester (4th creation) extinct, 1743
Baron Lovel, of Minster Lovel, 1728; Earl of Leicester (5th creation) and Viscount Coke, 1744
Edward Seymour; 1695–1757; 8th Duke of Somerset; 6th Baronet	Anne Coke	Thomas Coke; 1697–1759; Earl of Leicester, etc.	Henry Somerset; 1684–1714; 2nd Duke of Beaufort, 4th Marquess of Worcester, 8th Earl of Worcester, 10th Baron Herbert	Charles Townshend; 1700–1764; Viscount Townshend
Earl of Hertford (4th creation) and Viscount Beauchamp (2nd creation), 1850; Marquess of Hertford (2nd creation) and Earl of Yarmouth (3rd creation), 1793	Earldom of Leicester (5th creation) and subsidiary titles extinct, 1759	Viscount Sackville and Baron Bolebrooke, 1782
Edward Seymour; 1717–1792; 9th Duke of Somerset	Webb Seymour; 1718–1793; 10th Duke of Somerset	Francis Seymour; 1726–1799	Francis Seymour-Conway; 1718–1794; 1st Marquess of Hertford, etc., 2nd Baron Conway	Wenman (Roberts) Coke c. 1717–1776	Henry Somerset-Scudamore; 1707–1745; 3rd Duke of Beaufort, 5th Marquess of Worcester, 9th Earl of Worcester, 11th Baron Herbert	Charles Noel Somerset; 1709–1756; 4th Duke of Beaufort, 6th Marquess of Worcester, 10th Earl of Worcester, 12th Baron Herbert	George Townshend; 1724–1807; Marquess Townshend	Charles Sackville; 1711–1769; 2nd Duke of Dorset, 8th Earl of Dorset, etc., 3rd Earl of Middlesex, etc.	John Sackville; 1713–1765	George Germain; 1716–1785; 1st Viscount Sackville, etc.
Earl of Leicester (7th creation) and Viscount Coke (2nd creation), 1837	Baron Botetourt abeyance terminated, 1803	Earl of Leicester (6th creation), 1784
Francis Compton Seymour d. 1822	Francis Ingram-Seymour-Conway; 1743–1822; 2nd Marquess of Hertford, etc., 3rd Baron Conway	Hugh Seymour; 1759–1801	Thomas William Coke; 1754–1842; 1st Earl of Leicester, etc.	Henry Somerset; 1744–1803; 5th Duke of Beaufort, 7th Marquess of Worcester, 11th Earl of Worcester, 13th Baron Herbert, 5th Baron Botetourt	George Townshend; 1753–1811; 2nd Marquess Townshend, 1st Earl of Leicester	John Frederick Sackville; 1745–1799; 3rd Duke of Dorset, 9th Earl of Dorset, etc., 4th Earl of Middlesex, etc.
Baron Raglan, 1852
Edward Adolphus St Maur; 1775–1855; 11th Duke of Somerset	Francis Charles Seymour-Conway; 1777–1842; 3rd Marquess of Hertford, etc., 4th Baron Conway	George Seymour; 1787–1870	Henry Charles Somerset; 1766–1835; 6th Duke of Beaufort, 8th Marquess of Worcester, 12th Earl of Worcester, 14th Baron Herbert, 6th Baron Botetourt	FitzRoy James Henry Somerset; 1788–1855; 1st Baron Raglan	George Townshend; 1778–1855; 3rd Marquess Townshend, 2nd Earl of Leicester	George John Frederick Sackville; 1793–1815; 4th Duke of Dorset, 10th Earl of Dorset, etc., 5th Earl of Middlesex, etc.	John Frederick Sackville; 1767–1843; 5th Duke of Dorset, 11th Earl of Dorset, 6th Earl of Middlesex, etc., 2nd Viscount Sackville, etc.
Earldom of Leicester (6th creation) extinct, 1855	Dukedom of Dorset, Earldoms of Dorset (4th creation) and Middlesex (2nd creation), Viscountcy of Sackville, Baronies of Buckhurst (1st creation), Cranfield, and Bolebrooke extinct, 1843
Francis Edward Seymour; 1788–1866	Richard Seymour-Conway; 1800–1870; 4th Marquess of Hertford, etc., 5th Baron Conway	Francis George Hugh Seymour; 1812–1884; 5th Marquess of Hertford, etc., 6th Baron Conway	Henry Somerset; 1792–1853; 7th Duke of Beaufort, 9th Marquess of Worcester, 13th Earl of Worcester, 15th Baron Herbert, 7th Baron Botetourt
Earl St. Maur, 1863
Edward Adolphus St Maur; 1804–1885; 12th Duke of Somerset	Archibald Henry Algernon St Maur; 1810–1891; 13th Duke of Somerset	Algernon Percy Banks St Maur; 1813–1894; 14th Duke of Somerset	Francis Payne Seymour; 1815–1870	Thomas William Coke; 1822–1909; 2nd Earl of Leicester, etc.	Henry Charles FitzRoy Somerset; 1824–1899; 8th Duke of Beaufort, 10th Marquess of Worcester, 14th Earl of Worcester, 16th Baron Herbert, 8th Baron Botetourt	Richard Henry FitzRoy Somerset; 1817–1884; 2nd Baron Raglan
Earldom St. Maur extinct, 1885
Edward Adolphus Ferdinand St. Maur; 1835–1869	Algernon St Maur; 1846–1923; 15th Duke of Somerset	Edward Hamilton Seymour; 1860–1931; 16th Duke of Somerset	Hugh de Grey Seymour; 1843–1912; 6th Marquess of Hertford, etc., 7th Baron Conway	Thomas William Coke; 1848–1941; 3rd Earl of Leicester, etc.	Henry Adelbert Wellington FitzRoy Somerset; 1847–1924; 9th Duke of Beaufort, 11th Marquess of Worcester, 15th Earl of Worcester, 17th Baron Herbert, 9th Baron Botetourt	Henry Richard Charles Somerset; 1849–1932	George FitzRoy Henry Somerset; 1857–1921; 3rd Baron Raglan
Evelyn Francis Edward Seymour; 1882–1954; 17th Duke of Somerset	George Francis Alexander Seymour; 1871–1940; 7th Marquess of Hertford, etc., 8th Baron Conway	Henry Charles Seymour; 1878–1939	Thomas William Coke; 1880–1949; 4th Earl of Leicester, etc.	Arthur George Coke; 1882–1915	Henry Charles Somers Augustus Somerset; 1874–1945	FitzRoy Richard Somerset; 1885–1964; 4th Baron Raglan
Percy Hamilton Seymour; 1910–1984; 18th Duke of Somerset	Thomas William Edward Coke; 1908–1976; 5th Earl of Leicester, etc.	Anthony Louis Lovel Coke; 1909–1994; 6th Earl of Leicester, etc.	Henry Hugh Arthur FitzRoy Somerset; 1900–1984; 10th Duke of Beaufort, 12th Marquess of Worcester, 16th Earl of Worcester, 18th Baron Herbert, 10th Baron Botetourt	Henry Robert Somers FitzRoy de Vere Somerset; 1898–1965
Barony Botetourt abeyant, 1984
Hugh Edward Conway Seymour; 1930–1997; 8th Marquess of Hertford, etc., 9th Baron Conway	Edward Douglas Coke; 1936–2015; 7th Earl of Leicester, etc.	David Robert Somerset; 1928–2017; 11th Duke of Beaufort, 13th Marquess of Worcester, 17th Earl of Worcester	FitzRoy John Somerset; 1927–2010; 5th Baron Raglan	Geoffrey Somerset; 1932–2025; 6th Baron Raglan
John Michael Edward Seymour b. 1952; 19th Duke of Somerset	Henry (Harry) Jocelyn Seymour b. 1958; 9th Marquess of Hertford, etc., 10th Baron Conway	Thomas Edward Coke b. 1965; 8th Earl of Leicester, etc.	Henry John FitzRoy Somerset b. 1952; 12th Duke of Beaufort, 14th Marquess of Worcester, 18th Earl of Worcester	Arthur Geoffrey Somerset; 1960–2012
Sebastian Edward Seymour b. 1982 styled Lord Seymour	William Francis Seymour b. 1993 styled Earl of Yarmouth	Edward Horatio Coke b. 2003 styled Viscount Coke	Henry Robert FitzRoy Somerset b. 1989 styled Marquess of Worcester	Inigo Arthur Fitzroy Somerset; 7th Baron Raglan b. 2004	Ivo Geoffrey Arthur Tarsus Somerset b. 2007
Heir apparent to the Dukedom of Somerset	Heir apparent to the Marquessate of Hertford	Heir apparent to the Earldom of Leicester	Heir apparent to the Dukedom of Beaufort	Heir presumptive to the Raglan Barony

Family tree of British royal dukes

Includes dukes of: Albany, Albemarle, Bedford, Cambridge, Clarence, Connaught and Strathearn, Cumberland, Edinburgh, Gloucester, Gloucester and Edinburgh, Hereford, Kent, Kintyre and Lorne, Norfolk, Ross, Somerset, Sussex, Windsor, and York, but only when royally.

Non-royal dukes are not included; see Royal dukedoms in the United Kingdom.
Also not included are titles mandated for use by the heir apparent (Duke of Rothesay and the 1337 creation of the Duke of Cornwall), see Princes of Wales family tree.

King Robert II; 1316–1390	King Edward III; 1312–1377
Duke of Albany (1st creation), 1398	Duke of Clarence (1st creation), 1362	Duke of York (1st creation), 1385
King Robert III c. 1337–1406	Robert Stewart c. 1340–1420; 1st Duke of Albany	Edward the Black Prince; 1330–1376	Lionel of Antwerp; 1338–1368; Duke of Clarence	John of Gaunt; 1340–1399	Edmund; 1341–1402; 1st Duke of York
Dukedom of Clarence (1st creation) extinct, 1368
Duke of Cornwall (2nd creation), 1376	Duke of Hereford, 1397	Duke of Gloucester (1st creation), 1385
Murdoch Stewart c. 1362–1425; 2nd Duke of Albany	Richard of Bordeaux; 1367–1400; Duke of Cornwall, later King Richard II	Henry Bolingbroke; 1367–1413; Duke of Hereford, later King Henry IV	Thomas of Woodstock; 1355–1397; Duke of Gloucester
Dukedom of Albany (1st creation) forfeit, 1425	Dukedom of Cornwall (2nd creation) merged in the crown, 1377	Dukedom of Hereford merged in the crown, 1399	Dukedom of Gloucester (1st creation) extinct, 1397
Duke of Clarence (2nd creation), 1412	Duke of Bedford (1st & 2nd creations), 1414	Duke of Gloucester (2nd creation), 1414	Duke of Albemarle (Aumale) (1st creation), 1397
Thomas of Lancaster; 1387–1421; Duke of Clarence	John of Lancaster; 1389–1435; Duke of Bedford; Surrendered dukedom and then regranted, 1433	Humphrey of Lancaster; 1390–1447; Duke of Gloucester	John Beaufort; 1373–1410	Joan Beaufort c. 1379–1440	Edward of Norwich c. 1373–1415; Duke of Aumale, 2nd Duke of York	Richard of Conisburgh; 1385–1415
Dukedom of Clarence (2nd creation) extinct, 1421	Dukedom of Bedford (2nd creation) extinct, 1435	Dukedom of Gloucester (2nd creation) extinct, 1447	Dukedom of Albemarle (Aumale) (1st creation) forfeit, 1399
Duke of York (1st creation) restored, 1425; Duke of Cornwall (3rd creation), 1460
King James I 1394–1437	Joan Beaufort c. 1404–1445	Owen Tudor c. 1400–1461	John Beaufort; 1404–1444	Richard Neville; 1400–1460	Cecily Neville; 1415–1495	Richard of York; 1411–1460; 3rd Duke of York, Duke of Cornwall
Duke of Cornwall (3rd creation) extinct, 1460
Duke of Bedford (5th creation), 1485	Duke of Clarence (3rd creation), 1461	Duke of Gloucester (3rd creation), 1461
King James II; 1430–1460	Jasper Tudor c. 1431–1495; Duke of Bedford	Edmund Tudor c. 1430–1456	Lady Margaret Beaufort; 1443–1509	John Neville c. 1431–1471	Elizabeth Woodville c. 1437–1492	Edward; 1442–1483; 4th Duke of York, later King Edward IV	George Plantagenet; 1449–1478; Duke of Clarence	Richard of York; 1452–1485; Duke of Gloucester, later King Richard III
Dukedom of Bedford (5th creation) extinct, 1495	Dukedom of York (1st creation) merged in the Crown, 1461	Dukedom of Clarence (3rd creation) forfeit, 1478	Dukedom of Gloucester (3rd creation) merged in the Crown, 1483
Duke of Albany (2nd creation), 1458	Duke of Bedford (3rd creation), 1470	Duke of York (2nd creation), 1474; Duke of Norfolk (3rd creation), 1477	Duke of Bedford (4th creation), 1478
Alexander Stewart c. 1454–1485; 1st Duke of Albany	King James III; 1451/1452–1488	George Neville; 1457–1483; Duke of Bedford	King Henry VII; 1457–1509	Elizabeth of York; 1466–1503	Richard of Shrewsbury; 1473–1483; Duke of York, Duke of Norfolk	George of York; 1477–1479; Duke of Bedford
Dukedom of Bedford (3rd creation) forfeit, 1478	Dukedom of York (2nd creation) and Dukedom of Norfolk (3rd creation) extinct, 1483	Dukedom of Bedford (4th creation) extinct, 1479
Duke of Ross (1st creation), 1488	Duke of York (3rd creation), 1494	Duke of Somerset (3rd creation), 1499
John Stewart; 1482–1536; 2nd Duke of Albany	James Stewart; 1476–1504; Duke of Ross	King James IV; 1473–1513	Margaret Tudor; 1489–1541	Henry; 1491–1547; Duke of York, later King Henry VIII	Edmund Tudor; 1499–1500; Duke of Somerset (nominated but probably not invested)
Dukedom of Albany (2nd creation) extinct, 1536	Dukedom of Ross (1st creation) extinct, 1504	Dukedom of York (3rd creation) merged in the Crown, 1509	Dukedom of Somerset (3rd creation) extinct, 1500
Duke of Ross (2nd creation), 1514
King James V 1512–1542	Alexander Stewart; 1514–1515; Duke of Ross
Duke of Albany (3rd creation), 1565	Dukedom of Ross (2nd creation) extinct, 1515
Henry Stuart; 1546–1567; 1st Duke of Albany	Queen Mary; 1542–1587
James; 1566–1625; 2nd Duke of Albany, later King James VI & I
Dukedom of Albany (3rd creation) merged in the Crown, 1567
Duke of Albany (4th creation), 1604; Duke of York (4th creation), 1605	Duke of Kintyre and Lorne, 1602
Elizabeth Stuart; 1596–1662	Henry Frederick; 1594–1612	Charles; 1600–1649; Duke of Albany, Duke of York, later King Charles I	Robert Stuart; 1602; Duke of Kintyre and Lorne
Dukedom of Albany (4th creation), Dukedom of York (4th creation) merged in the Crown, 1625	Dukedom of Kintyre and Lorne extinct, 1602
Duke of York (5th creation) 1644; Duke of Albany (5th creation), 1660	Duke of Gloucester (4th creation), 1659
Sophia of Hanover; 1630–1714	James Stuart; 1633–1701; Duke of York, Duke of Albany, later King James VII & II	Henry; 1640–1660; Duke of Gloucester
Dukedom of Albany (5th creation) and Dukedom of York (5th creation) merged in the Crown, 1685	Dukedom of Gloucester (4th creation) extinct, 1660
Duke of York and Albany (1st creation), 1716	Duke of Cambridge (1st creation), 1664	Duke of Kendal (1st creation), 1666	Duke of Cambridge (2nd creation), 1667
King George I 1660–1727	Ernest Augustus; 1674–1728; Duke of York and Albany	Charles Stuart; 1660–1661 styled Duke of Cambridge	James Stuart; 1663–1667; Duke of Cambridge	Queen Anne; 1665–1714	Charles Stuart; 1666–1667 designated Duke of Kendal	Edgar Stuart; 1667–1671; Duke of Cambridge	Charles Stuart; 1677 styled Duke of Cambridge
Dukedom of York and Albany (1st creation) extinct, 1728	Dukedom of Cambridge (1st creation) extinct, 1667	Dukedom of Kendal (1st creation), extinct, 1667	Dukedom of Cambridge (2nd creation) extinct, 1671
Duke of Cambridge (3rd creation)
George; 1683–1760; Duke of Cambridge, later King George II	William; 1689–1700 styled Duke of Gloucester
Dukedom of Cambridge (3rd creation) merged with the Crown, 1727
Duke of Edinburgh (1st creation), 1726	Duke of Cumberland (3rd creation), 1726
Frederick; 1707–1751; 1st Duke of Edinburgh, styled Duke of Gloucester until created Duke of Edinburgh	William Augustus; 1721–1765; Duke of Cumberland
Dukedom of Cumberland (3rd creation) extinct, 1765
Duke of York and Albany (2nd creation), 1760	Duke of Gloucester and Edinburgh, 1764	Duke of Cumberland and Strathearn, 1766
George; 1738–1820; 2nd Duke of Edinburgh, later King George III	Edward; 1739–1767; Duke of York and Albany	William Henry; 1743–1805; 1st Duke of Gloucester and Edinburgh	Henry; 1745–1790; Duke of Cumberland and Strathearn
Dukedom of Edinburgh (1st creation), merged in the Crown, 1760	Dukedom of York and Albany (2nd creation) extinct, 1767	Dukedom of Cumberland and Strathearn extinct, 1790
Duke of York and Albany (3rd creation), 1784	Duke of Clarence and St Andrews, 1789	Duke of Kent and Strathearn, 1799	Duke of Cumberland and Teviotdale, 1799	Duke of Sussex (1st creation), 1801	Duke of Cambridge (4th creation), 1801
Frederick; 1763–1827; Duke of York and Albany	William Henry; 1765–1837, Duke of Clarence and St Andrews, later King William IV	Edward; 1767–1820; Duke of Kent and Strathearn	Ernest Augustus; 1771–1851; King of Hanover, 1st Duke of Cumberland and Teviotdale	Augustus Frederick; 1773–1843; Duke of Sussex	Adolphus; 1774–1850; 1st Duke of Cambridge	Mary; 1776–1857	William Frederick; 1776–1834; 2nd Duke of Gloucester and Edinburgh
Dukedom of York and Albany (3rd creation) extinct, 1827	Dukedom of Clarence and St Andrews merged in the Crown, 1830	Dukedom of Kent and Strathearn extinct, 1820	Dukedom of Sussex (1st creation) extinct, 1843	Dukedom of Gloucester and Edinburgh extinct, 1834
Queen Victoria; 1819–1901	George V 1819–1878; King of Hanover, 2nd Duke of Cumberland and Teviotdale	George; 1819–1904; 2nd Duke of Cambridge	Mary Adelaide; 1833–1897
Dukedom of Cambridge (4th creation) extinct, 1904
Duke of Edinburgh (2nd creation), 1866	Duke of Connaught and Strathearn, 1874	Duke of Albany (6th creation), 1881
King Edward VII; 1841–1910	Ernest Augustus; 1845–1923; 3rd Duke of Cumberland and Teviotdale	Alice; 1843–1878	Alfred Ernest Albert; 1844–1900; Duke of Edinburgh	Arthur; 1850–1942; 1st Duke of Connaught and Strathearn	Leopold; 1853–1884; 1st Duke of Albany
Dukedom of Cumberland and Teviotdale forfeit, 1919	Dukedom of Edinburgh (2nd creation) extinct, 1900
Duke of Clarence and Avondale, 1890	Duke of York (6th creation), 1892
Albert Victor; 1864–1892; Duke of Clarence and Avondale	George; 1865–1936; Duke of York, later King George V	Mary of Teck; 1867–1953	Victoria of Hesse and by Rhine; 1863–1950	Arthur of Connaught; 1883–1938
Dukedom of Clarence and Avondale extinct, 1892	Dukedom of York (6th creation) merged in the Crown, 1910
Duke of Windsor, 1937	Duke of York (7th creation), 1920	Duke of Kent (2nd creation), 1934	Duke of Gloucester (5th creation), 1928
King Edward VIII; 1894–1972; Later Duke of Windsor	Albert; 1895–1952; Duke of York, later King George VI	Alice of Battenberg; 1885–1969	George; 1902–1942; 1st Duke of Kent	Henry; 1900–1974; 1st Duke of Gloucester	Alastair Arthur; 1914–1943; 2nd Duke of Connaught and Strathearn	Charles Edward; 1884–1954; 2nd Duke of Albany
Dukedom of Windsor extinct, 1972	Dukedom of York (7th creation) merged in the Crown, 1936	Dukedom of Connaught and Strathearn extinct, 1943	Dukedom of Albany (6th creation) forfeit, 1919
Duke of Edinburgh (3rd creation), 1947
Queen Elizabeth II; 1926–2022	Philip; 1921–2021; 1st Duke of Edinburgh	Edward b. 1935; 2nd Duke of Kent
Duke of York (8th creation), 1986 (revoked 2025)	Duke of Edinburgh (4th creation), 2023
Charles b. 1948; 2nd Duke of Edinburgh, later King Charles III	Andrew b. 1960; Duke of York	Edward b. 1964; Duke of Edinburgh	George Windsor b. 1962	Richard b. 1944; 2nd Duke of Gloucester
Dukedom of Edinburgh (3rd creation) merged in the Crown, 2022	No male heirs	Dukedom of Edinburgh (4th creation) is a life peerage and therefore not hereditary	Heir apparent to the Dukedom of Kent
Duke of Cambridge (5th creation), 2011	Duke of Sussex (2nd creation), 2018
William b. 1982; Duke of Cambridge	Harry b. 1984; Duke of Sussex	Edward Windsor b. 1988	Alexander Windsor b. 1974
Heir-apparent to the Dukedom of Gloucester
George of Wales b. 2013	Archie of Sussex b. 2019
Heir apparent to the Dukedom of Cambridge	Heir apparent to the Dukedom of Sussex

== See also ==
- Duchess of Somerset
- Marquess of Hertford
- Baron Alcester
- Seymour Baronets
- Somerset House, Park Lane
