= Algernon St Maur, 15th Duke of Somerset =

Duke of Somerset

- Duke of Somerset
- Coat of arms
- Tenure: 1894–1923
- Predecessor: Algernon St Maur, 14th Duke of Somerset
- Successor: Edward Seymour, 16th Duke of Somerset
- Born: 22 July 1846
- Died: 22 October 1923 (aged 77)
- Buried: Brimble Hill Clump, near Bradley House, Wiltshire
- Spouse: Susan Richards Mackinnon (m. 1877)
- Father: Algernon St Maur, 14th Duke of Somerset
- Mother: Horatia Morier

Algernon St. Maur, 15th Duke of Somerset, etc. (22 July 1846 – 22 October 1923, in Maiden Bradley) was the son of Algernon St. Maur, 14th Duke of Somerset and Horatia Morler. He was also a baronet.

== Career ==
He was educated at Britannia Royal Naval College, but later joined the 60th Rifles and took part in the Wolseley Expedition of 1870. He was a tall and athletic man, of powerful build. After leaving the Regular Army, he spent several years ranching in Western America.

=== Dukedom ===
On accession to the Dukedom in 1894, he voted often in the House of Lords, although he seldom spoke there. He became president of Dr Barnardo's Homes, a charity which both he and the Duchess had supported for many years. As Duke of Somerset, he carried the Sovereign's Orb in the Coronation procession at the Coronation of Edward VII and Alexandra in 1902 and at the Coronation of George V and Mary in 1911.

== Personal life ==
=== Marriage ===
On September 5, 1877, he married Susan Margaret Richards Mackinnon, the ninth daughter of Charles Mackinnon of Corriechatachan, but the marriage was childless.

Somerset took a long lease of No. 35 Grosvenor Square, Mayfair in 1898, which he maintained as his London residence until his death in 1923. His widow Susan, Duchess of Somerset, continued to live at 35 Grosvenor Square until early 1934, after which she leased No. 30 Grosvenor Square until her death in 1936.

=== Death and estate ===
When Somerset died in 1923, he left no son, and his brothers Lord Ernest and Lord Edward had both recently died childless. As a result the Dukedom passed to his 62-year-old third-cousin-once-removed Brigadier-General Sir Edward Seymour, who was a male-line descendant of Edward Seymour, 8th Duke of Somerset. Sir Edward petitioned the House of Lords' Committee of Privileges in 1924 to be recognised as the successor to the Dukedom; his claim was accepted in 1925.

The Duke was buried on Brimble Hill Clump near his main residence at Bradley House, Maiden Bradley, Wiltshire. His widow was also buried there when she died in 1936. Their graves are in a little wood on a hilltop surrounded by agricultural land, with a metal fence around them, and marked by standing rough stones with small text plaques.

=== Estate ===
The Duke's unsettled property was valued at £684,923 for Probate in 1924, with a net value of £89,960; his estate was subject to over £250,000 in death duties. In his will he bequeathed one year's wages to any servants who had been in his employ for five years, and £1,000 each to his nieces Helen, Lettic and Lucy St. Maur.

He left his widow £1,000, a life interest in Berry House, Devon, the leasehold of his London townhouse at 35 Grosvenor Square and its contents, as well as a life annuity of £4,000 free of tax. The remainder of his real estate and residuary estate was bequeathed to his successor to the Dukedom.

== Ancestry ==
Ancestors of Algernon St Maur, 15th Duke of Somerset

Edward Seymour, 8th Duke of Somerset
Webb Seymour, 10th Duke of Somerset
Mary Webb
Edward St Maur, 11th Duke of Somerset
John Bonnell
Anna Maria/Mary Anne Bonnell
Algernon St Maur, 14th Duke of Somerset
James Hamilton, 5th Duke of Hamilton
Archibald Hamilton, 9th Duke of Hamilton
Anne Spencer
Lady Charlotte Douglas-Hamilton
Alexander Stewart, 6th Earl of Galloway
Lady Harriet Stewart
Lady Catherine Cochrane
Algernon Seymour, 15th Duke of Somerset
Isaac Augustin François Morier
Isaac Morier
Jeanne Pernette Barbey
John Philip Morier
David George van Lennep
Elisabeth Clara van Lennep
Anna Maria Leytstar
Horatia Isabella Harriet Morier
Francis Seymour-Conway, 1st Marquess of Hertford
Lord Hugh Seymour
Lady Isabella FitzRoy
Horatia Maria Frances Seymour
James Waldegrave, 2nd Earl Waldegrave
Lady Anne Horatia Waldegrave
Maria Walpole

Peerage of England
Preceded by Algernon St Maur	Duke of Somerset; 1894–1923	Succeeded by Edward Seymour
