= Algernon St Maur, 14th Duke of Somerset =

Duke of Somerset

His Grace The Duke of Somerset
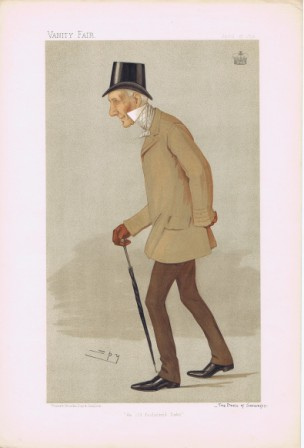
- "An old fashioned Duke". Caricature by "Spy" published in Vanity Fair in 1893.
- Born: Algernon Percy Banks St. Maur; 22 December 1813; Park Lane, Mayfair
- Died: 2 October 1894 (aged 80); Wells, Somerset
- Education: Eton College
- Spouse: Horatia Isabella Harriet Morier (m. 1845; died 1894)
- Children: Algernon Seymour, 15th Duke of Somerset; Lord Percy St Maur; Lord Ernest St Maur; Lord Edward St Maur
- Parent(s): Edward St Maur, 11th Duke of Somerset; Lady Charlotte Hamilton
- Relatives: Edward St Maur, 12th Duke of Somerset (brother); Archibald St Maur, 13th Duke of Somerset (brother)

Algernon Percy Banks St Maur, 14th Duke of Somerset (né Seymour; 22 December 1813 – 2 October 1894) was an English aristocrat.

== Early life ==
St Maur was born at Park Lane, Mayfair, in 1813, the third son of Edward St Maur, 11th Duke of Somerset and Lady Charlotte Hamilton, daughter of the 9th Duke of Hamilton.

He was educated at Eton.

== Career ==
St Maur served as a captain in the Royal Horse Guards. His father died in 1855. St Maur succeeded his elder brothers Edward (1804–1885), and Archibald (1810–1891), both of whom died without living male heirs, in the dukedom.

== Personal life ==
On 17 May 1845, he married Horatia Isabella Harriet Morier (1819–1915), daughter of diplomat John Philip Morier and Horatia Maria Frances Seymour (eldest daughter of Lord Hugh Seymour, himself the youngest son of the 1st Marquess of Hertford). Together, they had four sons:

- Algernon St Maur, 15th Duke of Somerset (1846–1923), who married Susan Margaret Richards Mackinnon, the ninth daughter of Charles Mackinnon of Corriechatachan in 1877.
- Lord Percy St Maur (1847–1907), a Major in the 1st Battalion, Royal Fusiliers; he married the Hon. Violet White, daughter of Luke White, 2nd Baron Annaly.
- Lord Ernest St Maur (1847–1922), who married Dora Constable, daughter of the Rev. John Constable, in 1907.
- Lord Edward St Maur (1849–1920), a Lieutenant in the 60th Rifles; he married Lilian Stanhope, daughter of John Stanhope, in 1879.

He died suddenly while visiting the Wells, Somerset home of Charles Clement Tudway (the son of MP Robert Tudway). He experienced indigestion followed by an apparent heart attack.

== Ancestry ==
Ancestors of Algernon St Maur, 14th Duke of Somerset

Sir Edward Seymour, 5th Baronet
Edward Seymour, 8th Duke of Somerset
Laetitia Popham
Webb Seymour, 10th Duke of Somerset
Daniel Webb
Mary Webb
Elizabeth Somner
Edward Adolphus St Maur, 11th Duke of Somerset
Andrew Bonnell
John Bonnell
Anna Maria/Mary Anne Bonnell
Algernon St Maur, 14th Duke of Somerset
James Hamilton, 4th Duke of Hamilton
James Hamilton, 5th Duke of Hamilton
Elizabeth Gerard
Archibald Hamilton, 9th Duke of Hamilton
Anne Spencer
Lady Charlotte Douglas-Hamilton
James Stewart, 5th Earl of Galloway
Alexander Stewart, 6th Earl of Galloway
Catherine Montgomerie
Harriet Stewart
John Cochrane, 4th Earl of Dundonald
Lady Catherine Cochrane

Peerage of England
Preceded by Archibald Seymour	Duke of Somerset; 1891–1894	Succeeded by Algernon St Maur
