= Archibald St Maur, 13th Duke of Somerset =

Duke of Somerset

His Grace The Duke of Somerset

High Sheriff of Leicestershire
- In office 1844–1845
- Preceded by: Sir Willoughby Dixie
- Succeeded by: William Corbet Smith

Personal details
- Born: Archibald Algernon Henry Seymour; 30 December 1810 Park Lane, Mayfair
- Died: 10 January 1891 (aged 80) Berkeley Square
- Parent(s): Edward St. Maur, 11th Duke of Somerset; Lady Charlotte Douglas-Hamilton

Archibald Algernon Henry St. Maur, 13th Duke of Somerset (né Seymour; 30 December 1810 – 10 January 1891) was an English aristocrat.

== Early life ==
He was born at his family's home on Park Lane, Mayfair, the second son of Edward St. Maur, 11th Duke of Somerset and Lady Charlotte Douglas-Hamilton. He was baptized on 17 June 1811 at St. George's, Hanover Square, London,

== Career ==
In 1885 succeeded his elder brother Edward Seymour, 12th Duke of Somerset, whose sons predeceased him. He was also a baronet. In his younger years, he had served as a captain in the Royal Horse Guards.

Lord Somerset spent much of his life at Burton Hall, in The Wolds, managing the estate. He served as High Sheriff of Leicestershire for 1844.

== Personal life ==
Archibald died at his London home at 28 Berkeley Square, London. He was buried in the churchyard at Maiden Bradley, Wiltshire on 16 January 1891. A memorial in the style of a grave was erected in the churchyard at Berry Pomeroy, Devon. As he died unmarried and childless, his titles passed to his brother, Algernon St. Maur.

=== Legacy ===
His motto, Foy Pour Devoir "Faith for Duty", has been adopted by HMS Somerset (IV) by permission.

== Ancestry ==
Ancestors of Archibald St Maur, 13th Duke of Somerset

Sir Edward Seymour, 5th Baronet
Edward Seymour, 8th Duke of Somerset
Laetitia Popham
Webb Seymour, 10th Duke of Somerset
Daniel Webb
Mary Webb
Elizabeth Somner
Edward Adolphus St Maur, 11th Duke of Somerset
Andrew Bonnell
John Bonnell
Anna Maria/Mary Anne Bonnell
Archibald Seymour, 13th Duke of Somerset
James Hamilton, 4th Duke of Hamilton
James Hamilton, 5th Duke of Hamilton
Elizabeth Gerard
Archibald Hamilton, 9th Duke of Hamilton
Anne Spencer
Lady Charlotte Douglas-Hamilton
James Stewart, 5th Earl of Galloway
Alexander Stewart, 6th Earl of Galloway
Catherine Montgomerie
Harriet Stewart
John Cochrane, 4th Earl of Dundonald
Lady Catherine Cochrane

Peerage of England
Preceded by Edward Seymour	Duke of Somerset; 1885–1891	Succeeded by Algernon St Maur
Honorary titles
Preceded by Sir Willoughby Dixie	High Sheriff of Leicestershire; 1844	Succeeded by William Corbet Smith
