= Henry Bisset =

12th- and 13th-century English noble

- Died: 1208
- Father: Manasser Biset

Henry Bisset (died 1208), Lord of Kidderminster, was an English noble. He served as dapifer, or steward, to King John of England.

== Life ==
Bisset was the only known son of Manasser Biset and Alice de Falaise. At his father's death in 1177, Bisset was still under age and placed under the care of a relative.

During 1202, Bisset is referred to as the dapifer. He was patron to the hospital that his father Manassar built for leper women at Bradley, Wiltshire (later Maiden Bradley). He owned the manor of Shamblehurst in Hampshire. Henry died in 1208.

== Marriage and issue ==
Bisset married Albreda FitzRichard. They had the following known issue:

- William Bisset (died 1220), married Sarah de Huntingfield, without issue; was succeeded by his brother John
- John Bisset, married Alice Basset, had issue
- Margaret Bisset, married Roger la Zouche, had issue

Secondly, Bisset married Iseult, daughter of William Pantulf and Joan de Goldington.
