= Seymour baronets =

Extinct baronetcy in the Baronetage of the United Kingdom

Arms of Seymour of Berry Pomeroy: Gules, two wings conjoined in lure or

There have been three Baronetcies created for persons with the surname Seymour, two in the Baronetage of England and one in the Baronetage of the United Kingdom. One creation is extant as of 2008.

The Seymour Baronetcy, of Berry Pomeroy in the County of Devon, was created in the Baronetage of England on 29 June 1611 for Edward Seymour, Sheriff of Devon and Member of Parliament for Devon. He was the eldest grandson of Edward Seymour, 1st Duke of Somerset by his first marriage to Catherine Fillol. Under the normal rules of inheritance, he would have been heir to the Dukedom of Somerset, had not the 1st Duke arranged for his son by his second marriage to be his heir, thus by-passing his first son (the 1st Baronet's father), Lord Edward Seymour (1529–1593) of Berry Pomeroy, Sheriff of Devon. The first six baronets, all named Edward, were all Members of Parliament; the first four lived at Berry Pomeroy Castle, purchased by the 1st Duke of Somerset. The 4th Baronet left Berry Pomeroy for Bradley House, Maiden Bradley, Wiltshire, current seat of his descendants the Dukes of Somerset. The 6th Baronet succeeded his very distant cousin as 8th Duke of Somerset in 1750. For further history of the baronetcy, see that title.

The Seymour Baronetcy, of Langley in the County of Buckingham, was created in the Baronetage of England on 4 July 1681 for Henry Seymour, Member of Parliament for East Looe, Cornwall, 2nd son of Sir Edward Seymour, 2nd Baronet (c. 1580–1659) of Berry Pomeroy. Sir Henry Seymour never married, and the baronetcy became extinct at his death.

The Seymour Baronetcy, of the Army, was created in the Baronetage of the United Kingdom on 28 October 1869 for Francis Seymour. The title became extinct on the death of the second Baronet in 1949.

== Seymour baronets, of Berry Pomeroy (1611) ==
- Sir Edward Seymour, 1st Baronet (c. 1563–1613)
- Sir Edward Seymour, 2nd Baronet (c. 1580–1659)
- Sir Edward Seymour, 3rd Baronet (1610–1688)
- Sir Edward Seymour, 4th Baronet (1633–1708)
- Sir Edward Seymour, 5th Baronet (1663–1740)
- Sir Edward Seymour, 6th Baronet (1695–1757) (succeeded as Duke of Somerset in 1750)

see Duke of Somerset for further succession

== Seymour baronets, of Langley (1681) ==
- Sir Henry Seymour, 1st Baronet (1674–1714)

== Seymour baronets, of the Army (1869) ==
- Sir Francis Seymour, 1st Baronet (1813–1890)
- Sir Albert Victor Francis Seymour, 2nd Baronet (1887–1949)

Baronetage of England
Preceded by Musgrave baronets	Seymour baronets of Berry Pomeroy; 29 June 1611	Succeeded by Finch baronets
Preceded by Parker baronets	Seymour baronets of Langley; 4 July 1681	Succeeded by Jeffreys baronets

== See also ==
- Culme-Seymour baronets
