= Susan St Maur, Duchess of Somerset =

Her Grace The Duchess of Somerset
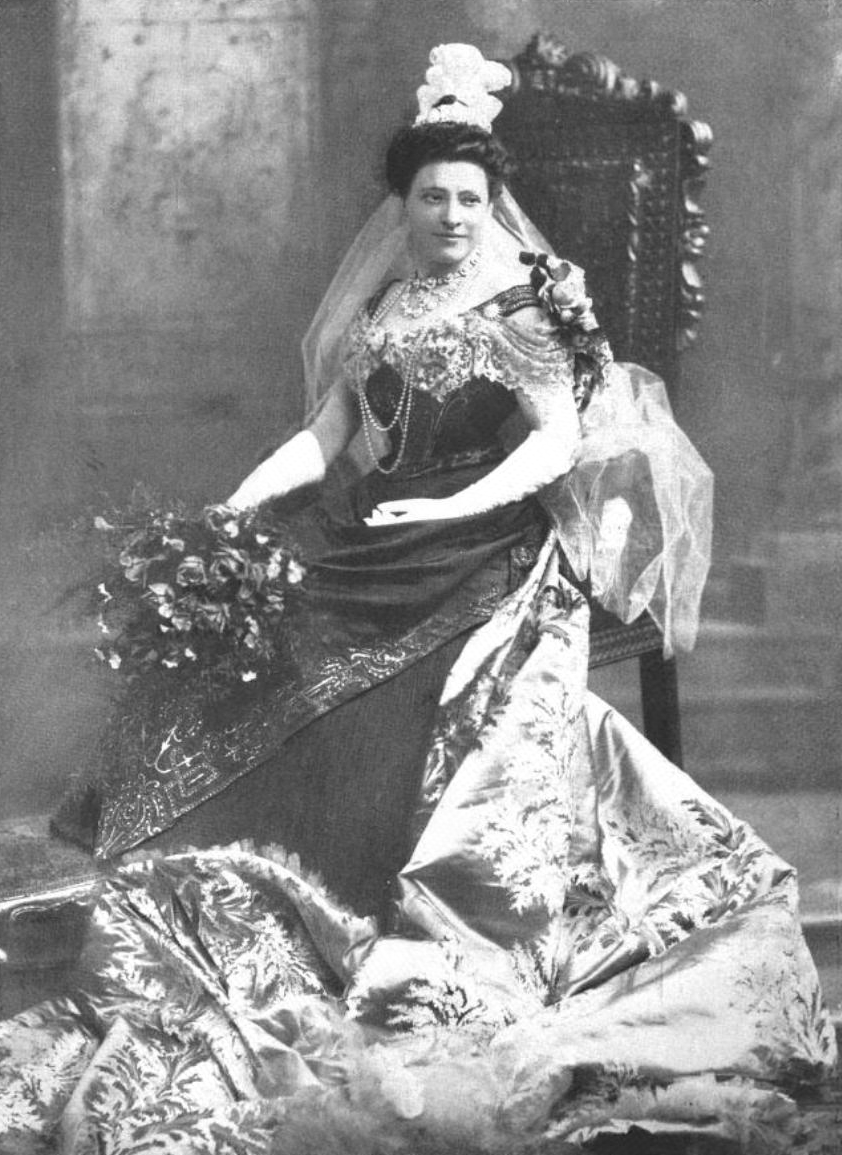
- In The Sketch, 28 March 1900
- Born: Susan Mackinnon; 11 January 1853
- Died: 30 January 1936 (aged 83); Mayfair, London, England
- Spouse: Algernon St Maur (m. 1877; died 1923)
- Occupation: Writer, philanthropist

Susan Margaret St Maur, Duchess of Somerset (née Richards Mackinnon GCStJ, 11 January 1853 – 30 January 1936), who also published as Mrs Algernon St Maur, was a Scottish writer and philanthropist.

== Early life ==
Susan Mackinnon was the ninth of ten daughters of Charles Mackinnon of Corriechatachan and Henrietta Studd.

== Marriage ==
She married Algernon St Maur, who later became 15th Duke of Somerset, on 5 September 1877, at Forres. The couple had no children.

Her husband took a long lease of No. 35 Grosvenor Square, Mayfair in 1898, which the couple maintained as their London residence until the Duke's death in 1923. The Duke bequeathed his lease of 35 Grosvenor Square and a life annuity of £4,000 to Susan, where she continued to reside until early 1934, after which she leased No. 30 Grosvenor Square until her death in 1936.

== Travel literature ==
She shared many of her husband's outdoor interests and, under the name Mrs Algernon St Maur, wrote a book Impressions of a Tenderfoot during a Journey in Search of Sport in the Far West (London, John Murray, 1890). This is a detailed account of a journey made over several months across Canada, in the company of her husband. Most of the journey was undertaken by train, with numerous pauses en route, and there are vivid descriptions of Canadian life and culture of that time. The book was widely read and enjoyed considerable popularity.

== Charities ==
A woman of great energy and enthusiasm, from 1905 onwards she became one of the leading organisers of the Invalid Kitchens charity and she was also active in a number of other charitable causes, including Dr Barnardo's Homes (of which her husband became president).

== Demise ==
She died at her home in Grosvenor Square on 30 January 1936, and was buried next to her husband on Brimble Hill Clump near their residence at Bradley House, Maiden Bradley, West Wiltshire. Their graves are in a little wood on a hilltop surrounded by agricultural land. They are surrounded by a metal fence and marked by standing rough stones with small text plaques.

== State recognitions ==
She was a Dame Grand Cross of the Order of the Hospital of St John of Jerusalem, and was also awarded the Medal of the Queen Victoria and Queen Alexandra Nurses Institution, the Belgian Queen Elisabeth Medal, the French Médaille de la Reconnaissance, the Italian Medaglia Benemeriti Croce Rossa, the Serbian Red Cross Order, and the Spanish Red Cross Merit Order.
