= Manasser Biset =

12th-century Anglo-Norman baron and royal official

- Died: 1177
- Spouse: Alice
- Parents: William Biset; Hawisa

Manasser Biset (sometimes Bisset or Manasseh Biset; died 1177) was an Anglo-Norman nobleman and royal official during the reign of King Henry II of England. Biset was one of the most frequent witnesses on Henry's documents, and served the king as a justice and in financial matters. He was rewarded with lands in England which have led him to be considered the first feudal baron of Biset.

== Life ==
Biset was the son of William Biset and Hawisa. The elder Biset held lands in Derbyshire and Nottinghamshire as the tenant of Stephen, Count of Aumale. Besides Manasser, William and Hawisa had another son named Henry.

Biset was a follower of Henry fitzEmpress and was a witness to charters of Henry's issued in France in the period 1151 to 1153. Biset obtained the office of dapifer, or steward, to Henry II shortly before Henry became king of England. Biset was with Henry in England in 1153, as he was a witness on documents drawn up for Henry in England during the early part of 1153. In April through December 1154, Bisset only witnessed Henry's documents that were drawn up in France. The king gave lands in Nottinghamshire, Worcestershire, Wiltshire, and Hampshire to Biset. These lands came to be considered the feudal barony of Biset, and Biset as the first baron. Besides the steward's office, Biset was also a baron of the exchequer and a royal justice. He was one of the most frequent witnesses on Henry's documents.

Before 1164, Biset founded a hospital for leper women at Maiden Bradley, Wiltshire, and gave it lands including the manor of Bradley, which had come to him through his wife.

== Family and death ==
Biset married Alice, who was the sister and heiress of Gilbert de Falaise, lord of Cany in France. Manasser's heir was his son, named Henry Bisset, who was still underage at his father's death in 1177. The administration of the lands and the custody of the heirs was given to Biset's nephew. Besides his son, Biset also had a daughter, Margaret.
