= Maiden Bradley =

Village in Wiltshire, England

Coordinates: 51.149°N 2.285°W

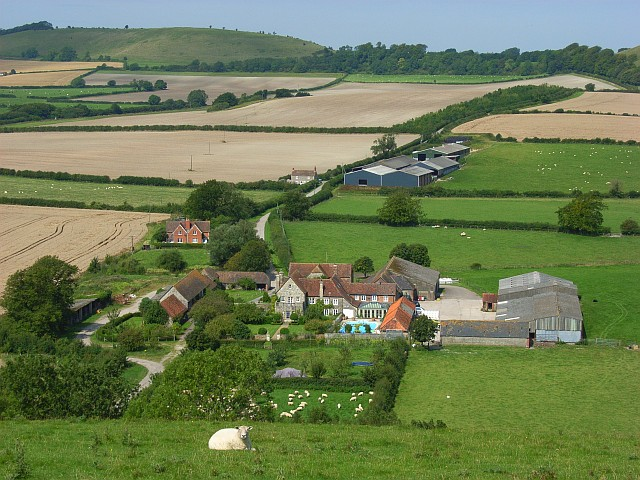
- The south-east of the parish forms this projection, of Rodmead Farm and Rodmead Hill.

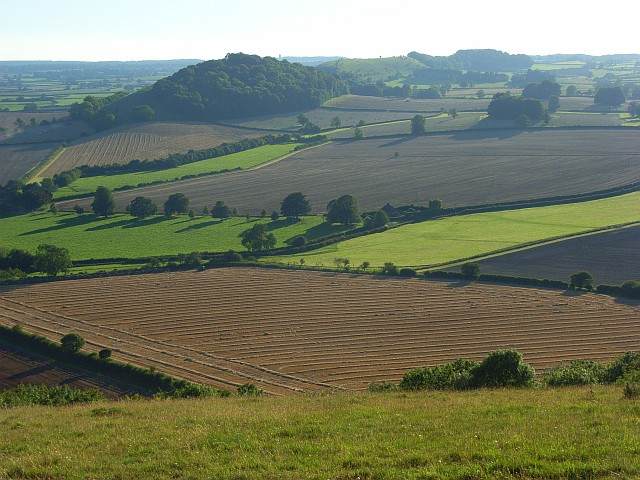
- The south of the parish including the Long Knoll, a marilyn, and Little Knoll (background)

- Location within Wiltshire
- Area: 18.62 km^{2} (7.19 sq mi)
- Population: 331 (2011 census)
  - Density: 18/km^{2} (47/sq mi)
- OS grid reference: ST802389
- Civil parish: Maiden Bradley with Yarnfield
- Unitary authority: Wiltshire
- Ceremonial county: Wiltshire
- Region: South West
- Country: England
- Sovereign state: United Kingdom
- Post town: Warminster
- Postcode district: BA12
- Dialling code: 01985
- Police: Wiltshire
- Fire: Dorset and Wiltshire
- Ambulance: South Western
- UK Parliament: South West Wiltshire
- Website: Parish Council

Maiden Bradley is a village in south-west Wiltshire, England, about 6 miles (10 km) south-west of Warminster and bordering the county of Somerset. The B3092 road between Frome and Mere forms the village street. Bradley House, the seat of the Duke of Somerset, is adjacent to the village.

Maiden Bradley is the principal settlement in the civil parish of Maiden Bradley with Yarnfield. The parish is in the Cranborne Chase and West Wiltshire Downs Area of Outstanding Natural Beauty and was one of the clearings in the former Selwood Forest. In the north-west the parish includes the hamlet of Gare Hill, but most dwellings there are in Trudoxhill parish, Somerset.

== Geography ==
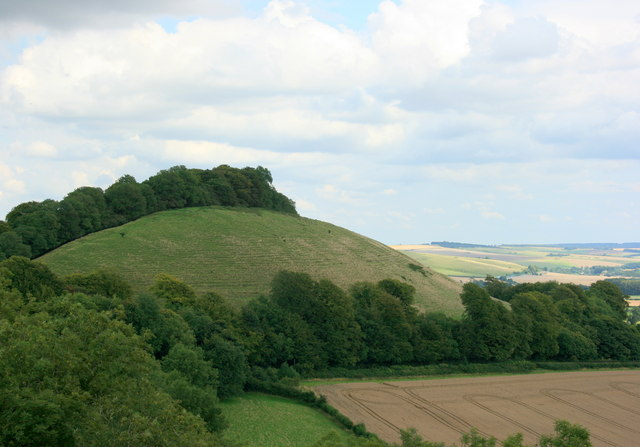
Little Knoll seen from Long Knoll

Great Bradley Wood and Little Bradley Wood form a large woodland which spans the Somerset border here, and occupies a large western tranche of Maiden Bradley parish. It occupies, at between 180m and 104m AOD (Above Ordnance Datum), the slopes down from the rolling plateau on which the village and its fields lie, which is between 180 and 240 metres AOD. This western woodland contains the source of the River Frome, which continues to drain most of its area. Most of the rest of the parish is drained by porous soil and underground gulleys, being largely chalk subsoil, which slopes gently down to the source of the River Wylye on the eastern border.

== History ==
=== Early history ===
The village takes its name from the leper hospital for maidens founded in the 12th century, which had royal connections; the hospital closed in the 14th century. Bradley means a wide clearing or wood; Brad = Broad (OE) and Ley = clearing (OE). 1½ miles south-west of the village is the deserted medieval village of Yarnfield (Gernefelle in the Domesday Book of 1086), now a farming hamlet. Formerly in the county of Somerset, Yarnfield was transferred to Wiltshire in 1895.

The earliest reference to the village is a Saxon land charter of 878, when the area had already been occupied for thousands of years. There are numerous tumuli including a Bronze Age barrow opened by Richard Colt Hoare in 1807; it contained a complete skeleton accompanied by numerous grave goods, some of which are now held by the Wiltshire Museum at Devizes.

Maiden Bradley was historically in the hundred of Mere in Wiltshire, while Yarnfield was within the Norton Ferris hundred in Somerset.

=== Medieval centuries and priory ===
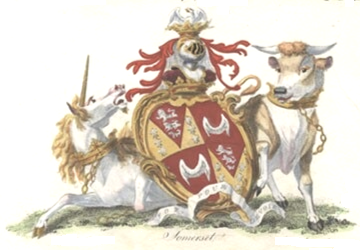
Coat of arms of the Duke of Somerset

By the mid-11th century, Bradley had developed as a large manor. The lord of the manor was Tostig Godwinson, brother of King Harold. The Domesday Book assessed Bradelei at 4,000 acres (16 km^{2}) worth £10 a year. The men numbered 6 villeins, 13 bordars, and 4 slaves.

In the early 12th century, the manor was added to the extensive landholdings of the prominent steward to Henry II, Manasser Biset. Sometime before 1164, Biset founded an asylum for girls suffering from leprosy, choosing a site north of the village where the present priory ruins stand. A proctor and his assistants ran the asylum. Biset's son Henry and daughter Margaret were among later benefactors.

In 1189, the Bishop of Salisbury changed the institution into an Augustinian priory, dedicated to St Mary and St Lazarus. The priory enjoyed royal protection, and prospered until the Dissolution of the Monasteries in 1536 or 1537. Its land was awarded by the King to local landowner Thomas Seymour, the brother of the 1st Duke of Somerset. The property has remained in the family since then.

A Monday market was authorised in 1267 and continued to be held each week for several centuries. The wide variety of goods included local produce and, later, coal from the Somerset mines.

=== 17th century ===
In 1646 the village was struck by the plague, and for ten months no-one was allowed to leave the village. As farming suffered and trading was impossible, the villagers relied on relief provided by neighbouring villages.

The house known as the Old Manor House on Church Street is mid 17th century in appearance, but Orbach identifies 16th-century features including timber framing, and states that the house was owned by the Lambert family until 1565. He describes the oversized Elizabethan fireplace in a first-floor room as "extraordinary".

Around 1688, Sir Edward Seymour, 4th Baronet deserted his fire-damaged family home at Berry Pomeroy Castle in Devon and used the money derived from stripping that castle to fund improvements to a new house next to the church at Bradley that had been started by his father, the 3rd Baronet. An exceptionally large mansion was completed here in 1710. Bradley House today is one wing of that house, remodelled in 1820.

=== Early modern ===
In 1780 there were three coaching inns in the village, which was at the intersection of the London to Barnstaple and Bath to Poole routes. In 1851 the population reached its peak at 619.

A two-room village school was built next to the High Street crossroads in 1847, largely paid for by the Duke of Somerset. It was enlarged in 1888 to take 130 children; the average attendance at this time was 100.

A limestone vicarage was built in Tudor style in 1843–4 on the other side of the road from the church, and enlarged in 1883; the resulting plan is described as "rambling" by Historic England. The house ceased to be used as a vicarage in the 1970s.

=== 20th century ===
The school was taken over by Wiltshire Council in 1905. The village hall was built in 1911 and given to the village by Lord Ernest St Maur in memory of his brother, Lord Percy. During the First World War, it was used as a military hospital.

In the late 20th and early 21st centuries, the village population fell to its lowest in at least 200 years; 328 in 1991 and 335 in 2001. Consequently, the school closed in 1969, and its building was divided into two houses. The Duke of Somerset still lives at Bradley House. The family coat of arms was displayed at the Somerset Arms public house.

== Places of worship ==
=== Church of England ===
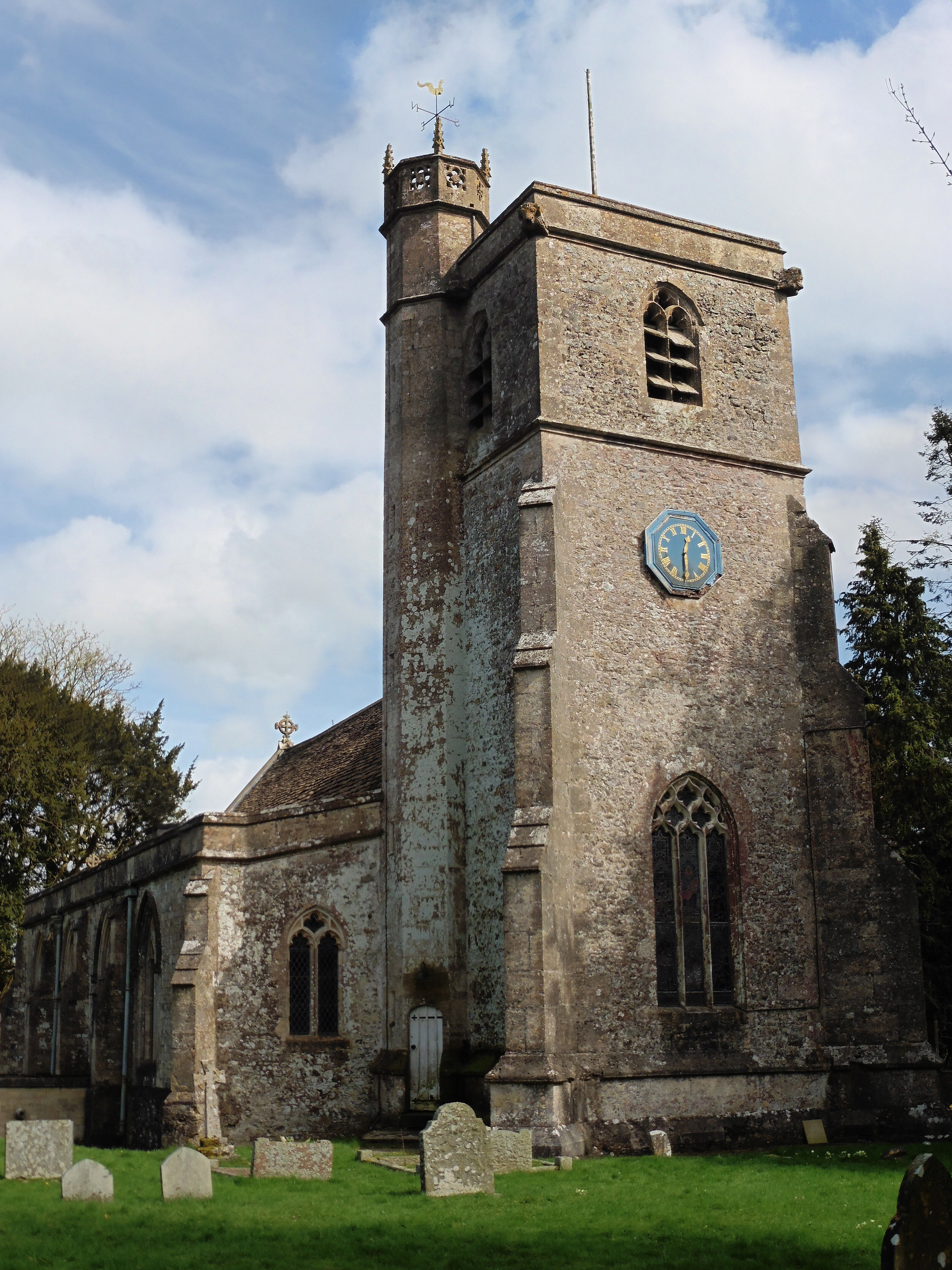
Tower of All Saints' church

The Church of England parish church of All Saints stands to the south-east of the village. A church was first mentioned in 1102 when Henry Bisset granted it to Notley Abbey, Buckinghamshire. The present building is almost certainly on the site of a Saxon church or chapel; its oldest parts are the westernmost three bays of the north arcade, which appear to date from the 12th century, although no clearly Norman features are visible.

The south arcade is from the early 14th century, and the fourth bay of the name was added in the same century; there was extensive rebuilding in 1385. The porch (with original door, and 18th-century metal sundial) and two-stage west tower are from the 14th and 15th centuries. Restoration was undertaken in the 1840s, and the chancel was restored in 1890. The large east window is early 19th century, and the west window of 1864 is by Lavers & Barraud. In the north aisle, a two-light window by Veronica Whall is a memorial to the 15th duke of Somerset (d.1923).

The square font, in Purbeck marble and standing on cylindrical shafts, is from the 12th century. Its wooden cover is 17th-century, as are the pulpit, reading desk and box pews; these furnishings are similar to those of St Michael's church in the nearby parish of Mere. There is a ring of six bells: one made in 1864 by Mears, the others recast in 1895 by the same foundry.

In the south aisle is a fine large monument to Sir Edward Seymour (d.1708), sculpted in 1728–1730 by Rysbrack to designs of James Gibbs. Julian Orbach, expanding Pevsner's description, writes: "The figure in contemporary dress is extremely elegant, semi-reclining on a grey marble tomb-chest against a sumptuous architectural background in varied marbles".

The church was designated as a Grade I listed building in 1966. Bradley House, since 1750 the seat of the dukes of Somerset, was built just north-east of the church in the 17th century. The church is the principal burial place for the Seymour family and the dukes; the church and family cemetery can be reached from the grounds of Bradley House via private access.

The benefice was held in plurality with Horningsham from 1953, and in 1958 the two benefices were united, with the incumbent to live at the Maiden Bradley parsonage house. A reorganisation in 1976 transferred Maiden Bradley parish to the benefice of Mere with West Knoyle, and this arrangement continues. Notable vicars include from 1976 John Smith, later Archdeacon of Wilts, described in his Telegraph obituary as a "country parson who made a fine Archdeacon of Wiltshire".

=== Reformed ===
A house was first licensed for Congregational worship in 1672 but later licensed for Independent worship. A chapel was built in 1820 and licensed for Independent worship in 1822. It became Congregational and remained so until 1972 when, in common with many other Congregational chapels, it became a United Reformed church. The chapel is rendered with a Welsh slate roof, and a plain stone Tuscan portico. A schoolroom was added to the eastern end and there is a 20th-century lean-to extension. Inside there is a late 19th-century gallery on wooden columns and an organ loft.

== Amenities ==
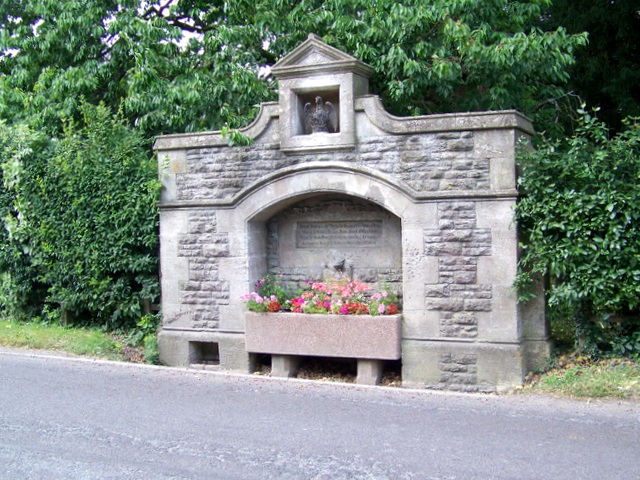
Maiden Bradley Fountain (1891), no longer in use

The village is served by The Bradley Hare (formerly The Somerset Arms), a traditional public house.

There is a part-time village shop at the Memorial Hall, run by villagers. The previous village shop opened in 1889 as a branch of Walton's Department Store of Mere. It sold most things – groceries, clothes, shoes, drapery, even furniture. From 2001 to 2018 it was replaced by a community-run shop, and the post office was housed in the same building.

== Governance ==
The parish is represented in Parliament by the MP for South West Wiltshire, Andrew Murrison, and in Wiltshire Council by Fleur de Rhé-Philipe.

== Notable people ==
Edmund Ludlow, landowner, MP and JP, lived at Maiden Bradley in the years before his death in 1624. Two of his sons, by his first and second wives, both named Henry (c.1577–1639 and 1592–1643) were also MPs. Edmund (born at Maiden Bradley c.1617), a son of the younger half-brother, was another MP and Parliamentary soldier who gained notoriety as a regicide of Charles I and fled to Switzerland after the Royalists regained power in 1660.
