= Corriechatachan =

Farmstead on the Isle of Skye, Scotland

Coordinates: 57°13′55″N 05°56′23″W

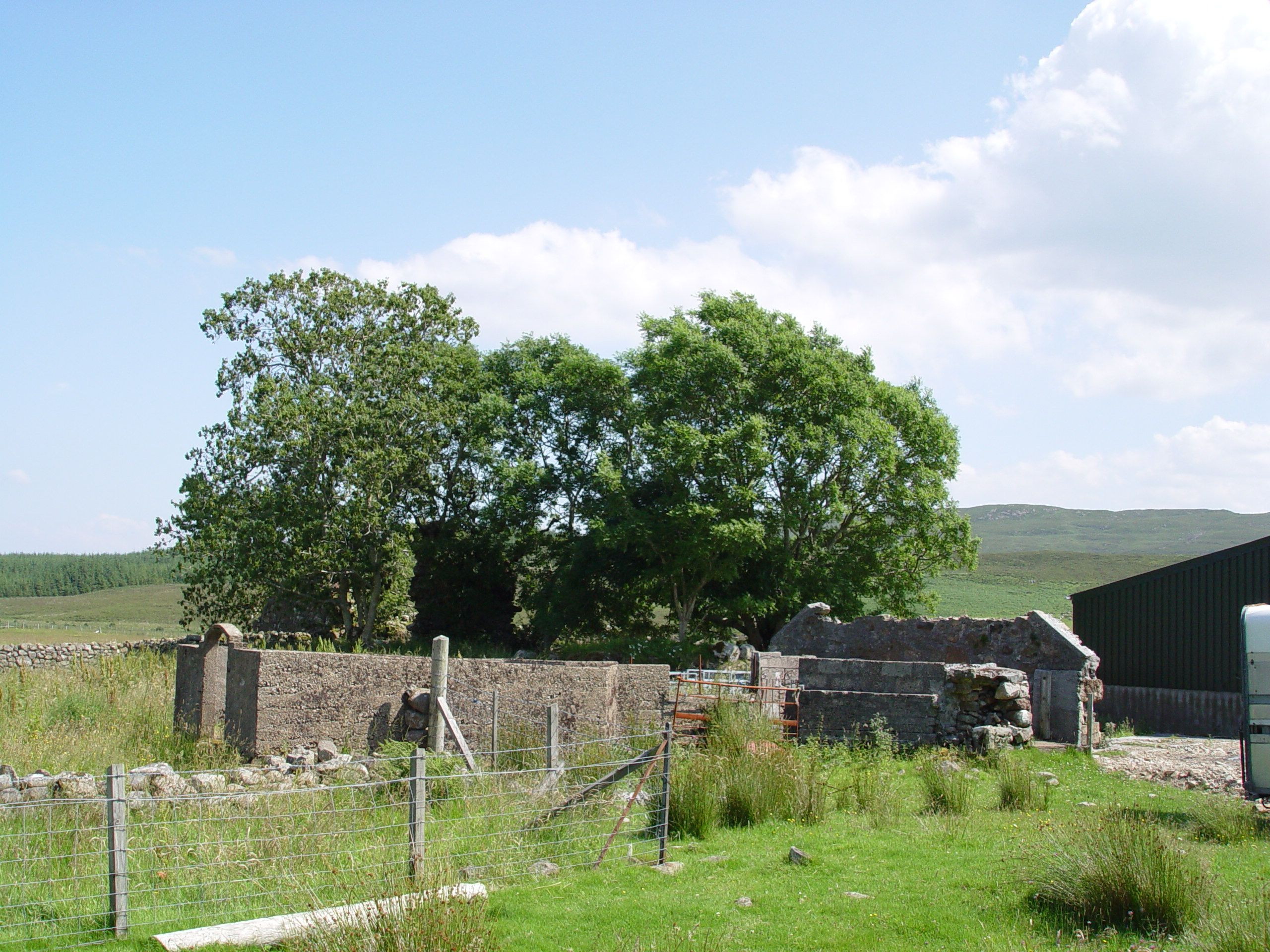
Corriechatachan ruins, July 2003

Corriechatachan (Gaelic for “Corrie of the wild cats”) is a farmstead (now ruined), lying at the foot of Beinn na Caillich, near Broadford, on the Isle of Skye. Until the 19th century, it was a tack farmed by a cadet branch of the Clan Mackinnon. Notable visitors included Thomas Pennant, in the course of the travels that resulted in the publication of A Tour of Scotland in 1769, and Samuel Johnson and James Boswell, on their tour of the Highlands.

== Johnson and Boswell ==
On their first visit, Johnson said: “From Armidel (Armadale) we came at night to Coriatachan, a house very pleasantly situated between two brooks, with one of the highest hills of the island behind it. It is the residence of Mr. Mackinnon, by whom we were treated with very liberal hospitality, among a more numerous and elegant company than it could have been supposed easy to collect.”

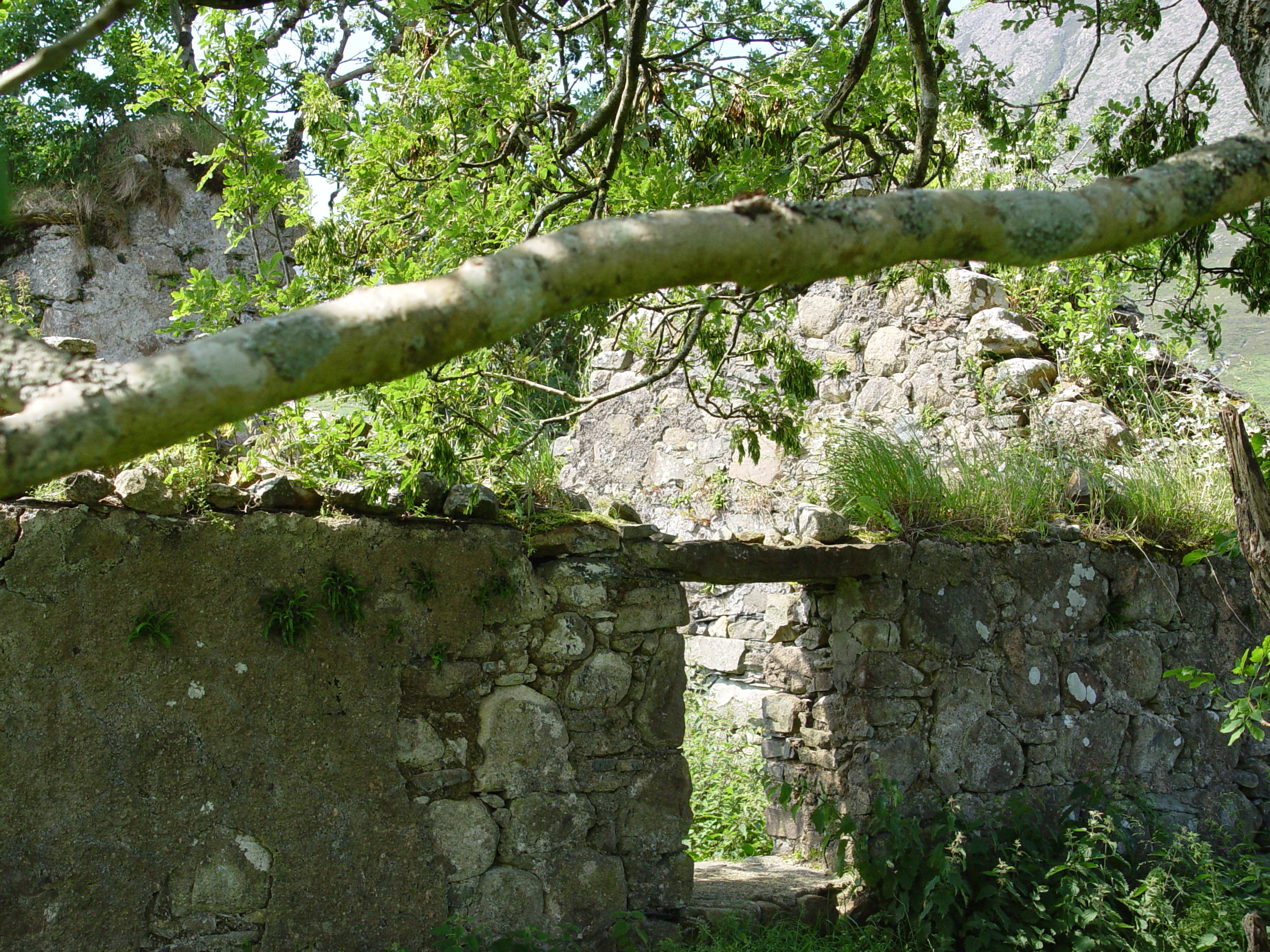
Corriechatachan ruins interior door on the ground level

Boswell recorded that; “Dr Johnson was much pleased with his entertainment here. There were many good books in the house: Hector Boethius in Latin; Cave's Lives of the Fathers; Baker's Chronicle; Jeremy Collier's Church History; Dr Johnson's small Dictionary; Craufurd's Officers of State, and several more…”

On their second visit, Boswell recorded, “This evening one of our married ladies, a lively pretty little woman, good-humouredly sat down upon Dr Johnson's knee, and, being encouraged by some of the company, put her hands round his neck, and kissed him. 'Do it again,' said he, 'and let us see who will tire first.' He kept her on his knee some time, while he and she drank tea. He was now like a BUCK indeed. All the company were much entertained to find him so easy and pleasant. To me it was highly comick, to see the grave philosopher--the Rambler--toying with a Highland beauty! But what could he do? He must have been surly, and weak too, had he not behaved as he did. He would have been laughed at, and not more respected, though less loved.”

== Legacy ==
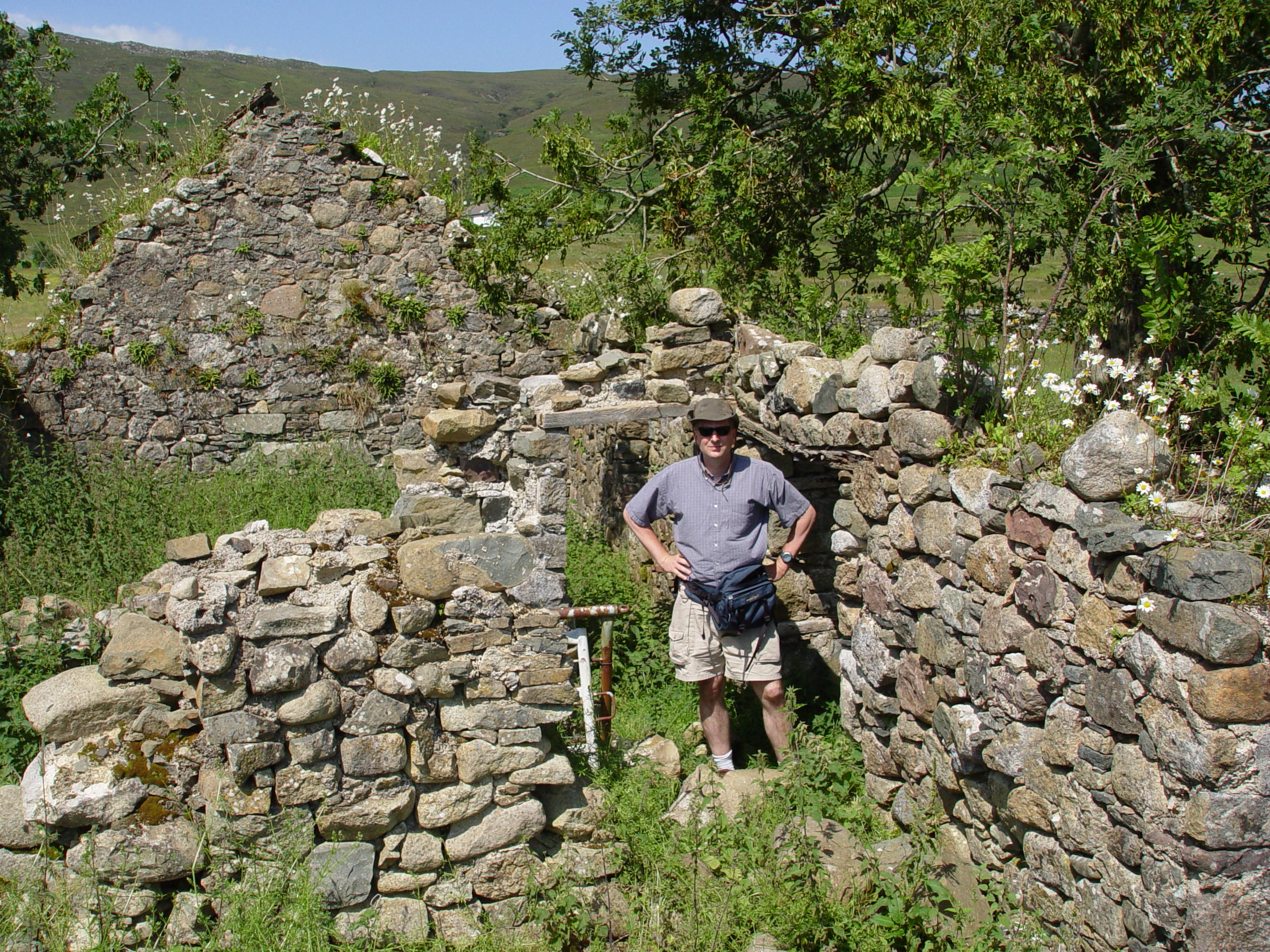
Corriechatachan ruins ground level

The Mackinnons occupied the house until about the year 1790 at which time they relocated to Corry Lodge in Broadford. The remains are now used as a sheep fank.
