= Berry Pomeroy Castle =

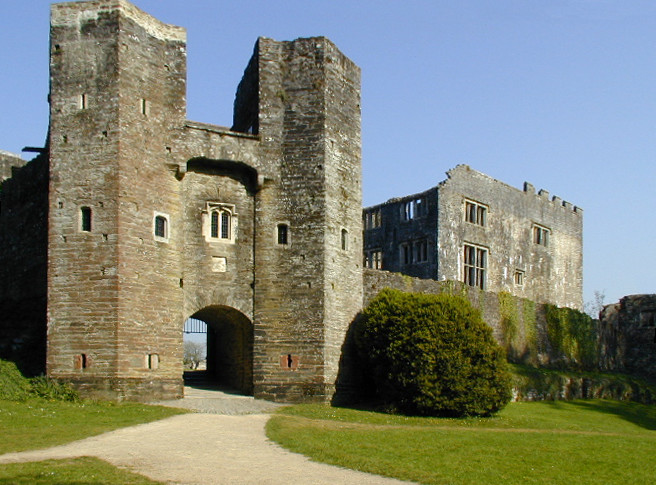

- Location within Devon

General information
- Type: Castle
- Location: Berry Pomeroy, England
- Coordinates: 50.4490°N 3.6366°W
- Demolished: After 1694
- Owner: The 19th Duke of Somerset (with administration by English Heritage)

Berry Pomeroy Castle, a Tudor mansion within the walls of an earlier castle, is near the village of Berry Pomeroy, in South Devon, England. It was built in the late 15th century by the Pomeroy family which had held the land since the 11th century. By 1547 the family was in financial difficulties and sold the lands to Edward Seymour, 1st Duke of Somerset. Apart from a short period of forfeit to the Crown after Edward's execution, the castle has remained in the Seymour family ever since, although it was abandoned in the late 17th century when the fourth baronet moved to Wiltshire.

After lying in ruins for a hundred years, in the 19th century the castle became celebrated as an example of the "picturesque", and it became a popular tourist attraction, a status which it retains today—aided by its reputation of being haunted. Between 1980 and 1996 the castle was subjected to extensive archaeological excavations that clarified much of its history and overturned beliefs regarding its age and cause of destruction.

== Location ==
Berry Pomeroy Castle is located about one mile (1.6 km) north-east of the village of Berry Pomeroy in South Devon. It occupies a limestone outcrop that overlooks the deep, wooded, narrow valley of the Gatcombe Brook.

== History ==
=== The Pomeroys ===
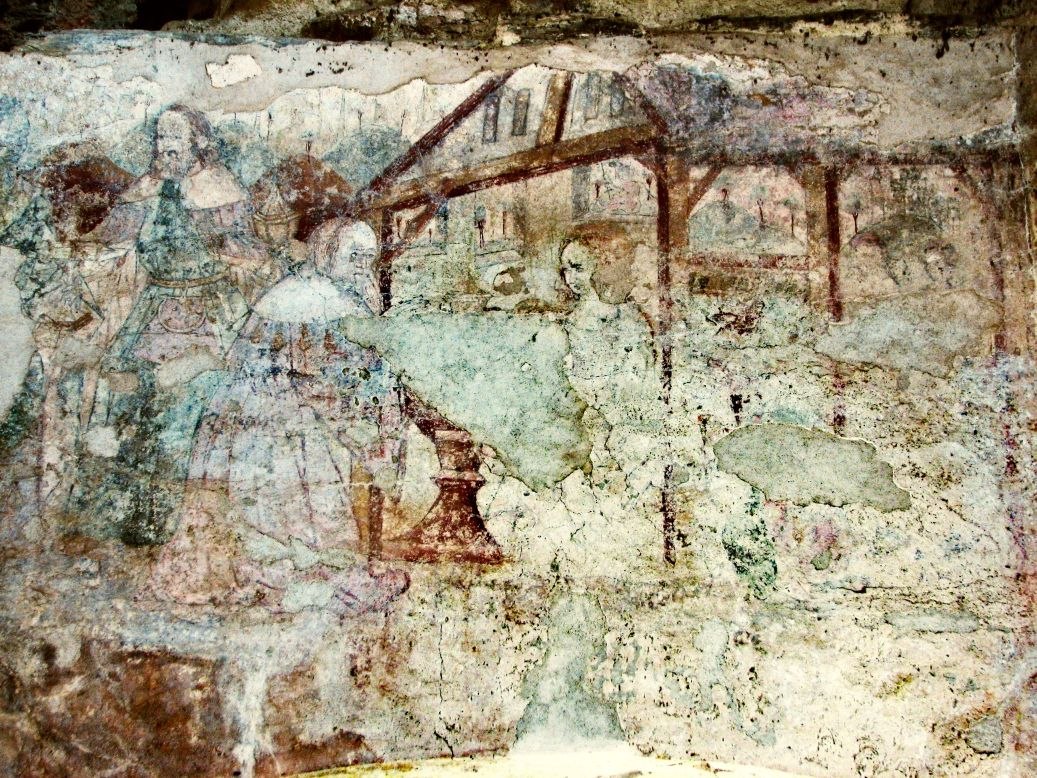
The Adoration of the Magi wall painting (considerably enhanced to bring out the faint detail).

The de la Pomeroy family held the large feudal barony of Berry Pomeroy from shortly after the Norman Conquest of England, as the Domesday Book of 1086 records. Early documents refer to a "capital messuage" at Berry, signifying the caput of the manor, which manor in turn was the caput of the barony, which consisted in 1166 of almost 32 knight's fees, each equating approximately to a single manor. Although Henry Pomeroy enclosed a deer park here in 1207, the first reference to a castle does not appear until 1496, when Elizabeth, widow of Richard Pomeroy, was assigned a third of both the castle and the capital messuage. The document makes it clear that these were on different sites; the messuage is now thought to have been on or near the site of Berry House in the nearby village.

Archaeological evidence, and particularly the design of the gun ports in the gatehouse and St. Margaret's Tower, which together with the curtain wall are the oldest parts of the castle, indicate that the castle was probably built in the late 15th century. It would have been one of the last traditional personal castles to be built in the country, located on a favoured site within the Pomeroys' deer park.

Under the Pomeroys the castle consisted of a dry moat (now mostly infilled), gatehouse and ramparts surmounted by the curtain wall with buildings disposed around the wall on the inside. Due to the extensive remodelling that took place later, very few archaeological remains survive to show the exact placement of these original buildings. In 1978, a wall painting was discovered in the upper storey of the gatehouse, hidden behind a thick layer of vegetation. It is a representation of the Adoration of the Magi, and has been dated to c.1490–1500 based on its stylistic similarity to European works of the period.

=== The Seymours ===
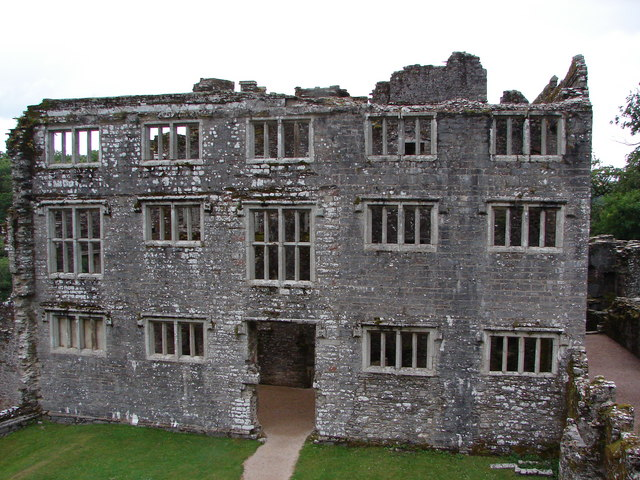
The shell of the early Seymour house

In 1547 Edward Seymour, 1st Duke of Somerset, Lord Protector to the young King Edward VI, bought the castle from Sir Thomas Pomeroy. He bought many other properties at around this time, and may never have visited Berry Pomeroy. He fell out of favour with the court and was beheaded on a charge of treason in 1552, upon which all his lands were forfeit to the Crown. It was not until 1558, after complex property dealings, that his son by his first marriage, Lord Edward Seymour, gained title to the castle. He became a considerable landowner, High Sheriff of Devon in 1583 and a Justice of the Peace in 1591. Between 1560 and 1580 he removed the earlier Pomeroy buildings inside the castle walls and erected a new four-storey house in the fashionable style of the period at the north end of the courtyard, the shell of which survives mostly to its original height.

After Sir Edward's death in 1593, his lands passed to his son, another Edward, who added the North Range to the castle in about 1600. In the late 16th century there was concern at the threat of a Spanish invasion and he received a commission as Colonel and he was twice Sheriff for Devon. He died in 1613, two years after being created a baronet. There is a well-preserved monument to him in St Mary's Church, Berry Pomeroy.

Sir Edward Seymour, 2nd Baronet, his son, was Governor of Dartmouth and a member of parliament and was knighted in 1603. He was much involved in shipping and lived in style at the castle until the Civil War, when he sided with the Royalists. He was captured and while he was imprisoned in London the castle was raided by Parliamentarians. His estates were sequestered by Cromwell, but he was allowed to stay at the castle, where he died in 1659. His son, another Edward (later the 3rd Baronet), was also a Royalist and was appointed a colonel in 1642. In the latter part of the Civil War he was imprisoned in Exeter and was not released until 1655. After the Restoration in 1660, however, his life took a turn for the better and he was soon a Deputy Lieutenant for Devon. He later became a Vice-Admiral and member of parliament for Totnes. On his death in 1688 an inventory of the castle was drawn up. It indicates that the house then contained around fifty rooms, although it is likely that the buildings were in poor repair, due to the vast expense Seymour had incurred in the Royalist cause.

His son, Edward, 4th Baronet, was aged 55 when his father died in 1688, but his mother Lady Anne stayed in the castle until she died in 1694. Because of the existence of an inventory of the castle originating from 1688, when the 4th baronet inherited the castle, we may conclude it to have been very comfortable at that time – in accordance to the term "splendid" as it was used by the vicar John Prince in his book (see below) to describe the condition of the building. The 4th baronet was an earnest politician – he was member of parliament for Exeter and from 1673 Speaker of the House of Commons. Because of Berry Pomeroy's distance from London, he preferred to live at Bradley House in Maiden Bradley, Wiltshire, which he had also inherited. Although there is no documentary evidence, it is likely that he stripped the castle of useful materials to fund the rebuilding of Bradley House which he completed in 1710.

Certainly, Berry Pomeroy Castle was in use until 1694, and it is supposed to have been demolished after the death of Lady Anne. It had been described as a ruin in 1701, when John Prince, who had known the castle in its heyday, said in his book The Worthies of Devon:

...The apartments within were very splendid; especially the dining room, which was adorn'd, besides paint, with statues and figures cut in alabaster [...] 'tis now demolished, and all this glory lieth in the dust...

=== 19th century ===
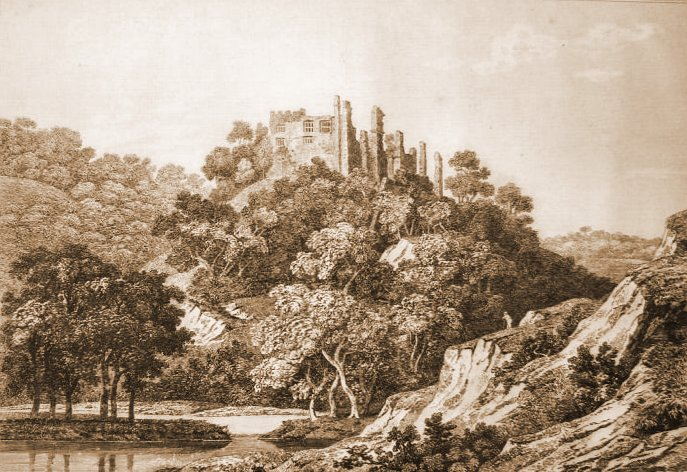
An etching of Berry Pomeroy Castle from 1822

With the rise of the "picturesque" aesthetic at the end of the 18th century, the castle, by then the haunt of jackdaws and overgrown with ivy, was considered to be a romantic ruin. It was often visited by artists and became a popular tourist destination: illustrations of it were featured in many books of the genre. The J.V. Somers Cocks catalogue of Devon Topographical Prints lists 45 prints of the castle, from the earliest by Samuel and Nathaniel Buck, published in London in 1734, to one published in Exeter in 1861.

In around 1830 some of the crumbling walls were repaired by the Duke of Somerset, one of the first examples of architectural conservation work on a ruined building, probably prompted by concern over the safety of visitors.

=== Late 20th century excavations ===
Between 1980 and 1996 the castle was subjected to extensive archaeological excavations, fully documented in the 1996 volume of Devon Archaeological Society Proceedings. These investigations clarified much of the castle's history and overturned a number of previously held beliefs. For instance it had been believed that the castle was much older than it has now been shown to be: a guidebook of around 1940 stated that "All the portions of the ruins of Berry Castle encircling the interior were indisputably the work of that de Pomeroy on whom the Conqueror bestowed the manor after his invasion of England in 1066". However, the excavations found no trace of buildings earlier than the late 15th century and only five sherds of late medieval pottery were found, leading to the conclusion that there could not have been anything more substantial than a hunting lodge or park-keeper's house on the site before the late 15th century construction of the castle.

Commonly held beliefs regarding the destruction of the castle were that it was bombarded by cannon fire from the hillside opposite during the Civil War, or that it was destroyed by a huge fire after being struck by lightning. The excavations uncovered no indication of either of these supposed fates, but did show evidence that the buildings were systematically stripped of re-usable materials shortly after demolition.

== Legends and ghosts ==
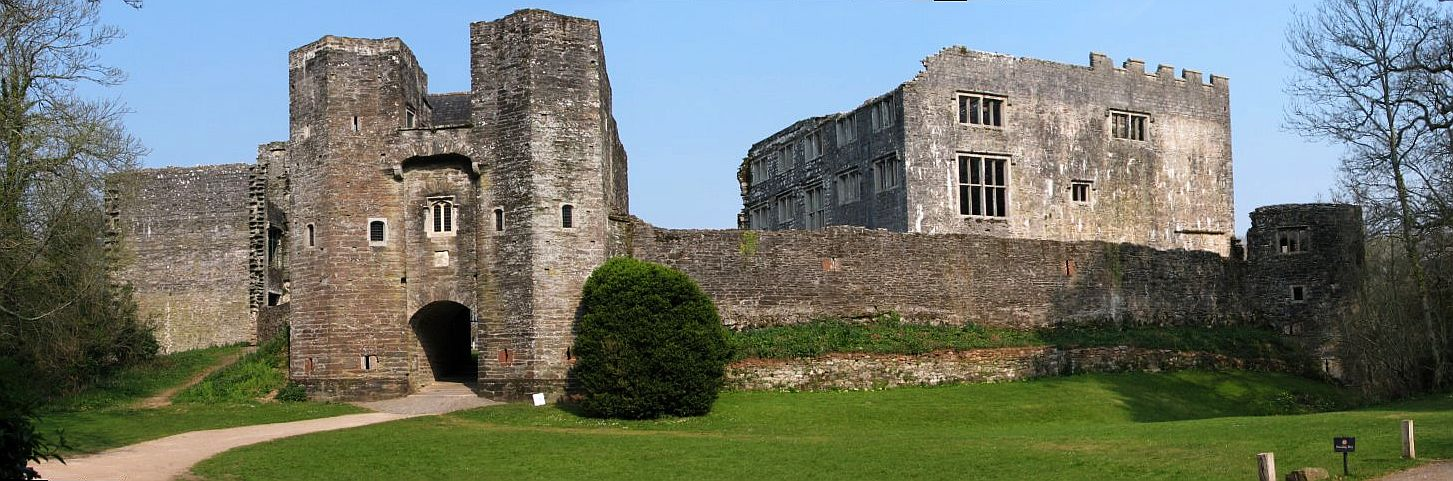
The gatehouse, curtain wall, and at the far right, in shadow, St. Margaret's Tower, with the Tudor mansion behind

There are a number of legends associated with the castle, and according to the English Heritage guidebook, it "is reputed to be one of the most haunted castles in Britain." Two female ghosts are said to haunt the castle: the White Lady, and the Blue Lady. The Blue Lady is said to beckon for help from passers-by, luring them to her tower. If they go to her, it is said they fall to their death. She is thought to have been the daughter of a Norman lord and is said to wander the dungeons mourning the loss of her baby, which she murdered as it was sired by her own father. The White Lady, said to be the spirit of Margaret Pomeroy, is claimed to haunt the dungeons, having been imprisoned there by her sister, Eleanor, who was jealous of her beauty. Their stories often blur together.

There is legend of a wishing tree at Pomeroy Castle. The custom was to whisper a wish against the trunk of a beech tree and walk backwards around it several times which was alleged to bring the fulfilment of any wish.

The castle has appeared in a BBC Timewatch documentary "White Slaves and Pirate Gold", and the British television show Most Haunted.

== In popular culture ==
Edward Montague published a novel "The Castle of Berry Pomeroy" (1806). The true identity of the author is not known and there exist only two copies of the first edition (British Library/London and the Library of Corvey/Germany). It is a story of mystery, love and jealousy.

The castle is the fictional setting for Elizabeth Goudge's World War II novel The Castle on the Hill (1942), set in late 1940 during the start of the Blitz after the Battle of Britain, imagined as still being occupied by the descendants of the original family who built the castle after William the Conqueror arrived in 1066. Goudge's story includes an episode in which the castle is mainly destroyed by a German bomber jettisoning its bomb-load.

Berry Pomeroy Castle appeared as a location in Five Go Mad in Dorset, the first of three Five Go Mad specials from the long-running series of The Comic Strip Presents... television comedy films, first airing on the launch night of Channel 4 on 2 November 1982.

== Today ==
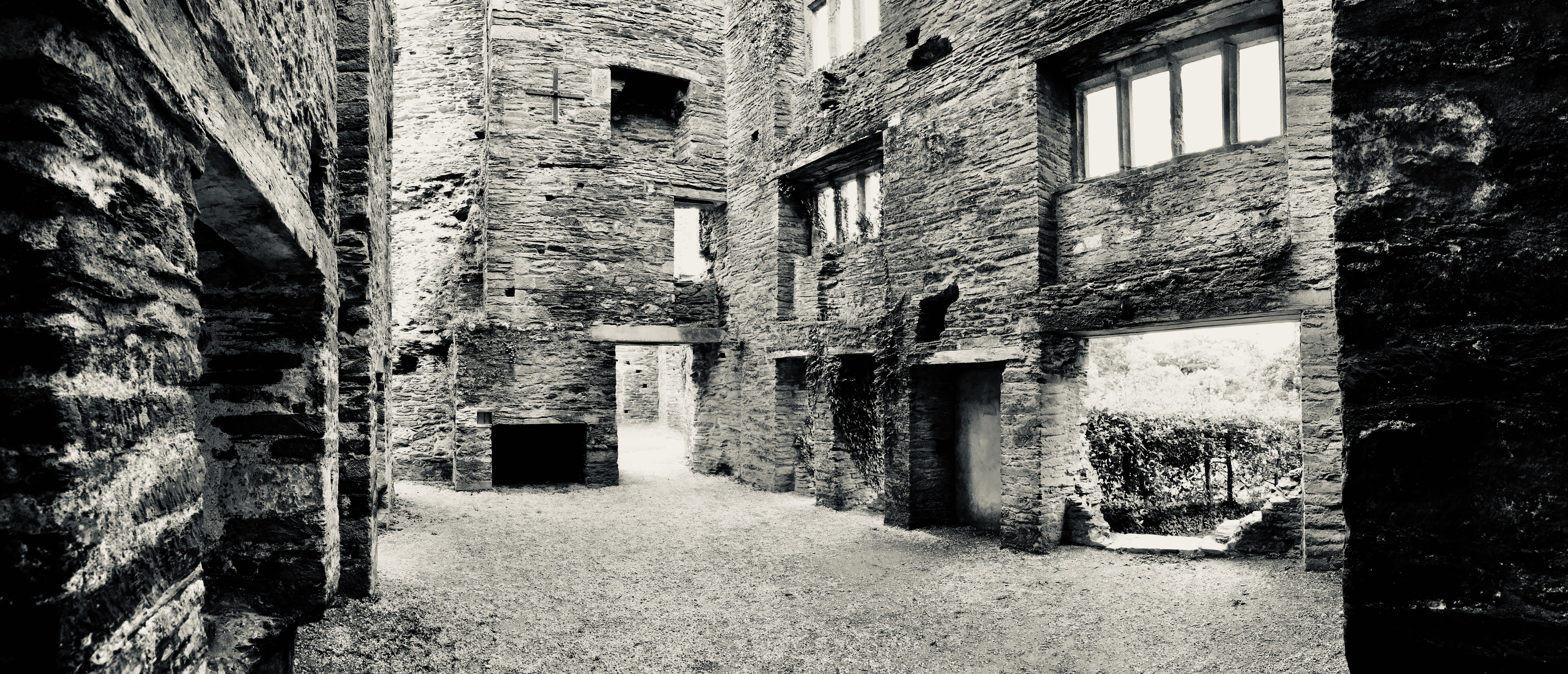
The living quarters of the castle.

Today the castle is a Grade I listed building. Still owned by John Seymour, 19th Duke of Somerset, it is administered by English Heritage.

The castle is approached by a modern one-half-mile-long (800 m) wooded drive running alongside an earlier drive, visible as an earthwork in the adjacent woods. A car park has been created in the quarry which was the source of much of the slate used for the Pomeroy buildings.

== See also ==
- Castles in Great Britain and Ireland
- List of castles in England
- Seymour family

== Sources ==
- Brown, Stewart (1997). Berry Pomeroy Castle (guidebook). English Heritage. ISBN 1-85074-671-0.
- Brown, Stewart (1998). "Berry Pomeroy Castle". Devon Archaeological Society Proceedings. 54: 1–201. ISSN 0305-5795.
- Coxe, Anthony D. Hippisley (1973). Haunted Britain. New York, US: McGraw-Hill Book Company.
- Francis-Cheung, Theresa (2006). "Berry Pomeroy Castle". The Element Encyclopedia of the Psychic World. Harper Element.
- Gill, M.; et al. (1998). "Appendix 13. The Wall Painting—Stylistic Analysis and Date". Devon Archaeological Society Proceedings. 54: 317–24. ISSN 0305-5795.
- Manco, Jean (1998). "Appendix 1. The History of Berry Pomeroy Castle". Devon Archaeological Society Proceedings. 54: 203–217. ISSN 0305-5795.
- Mortimer, T. C. & A. E. (c. 1940). Berry Pomeroy Castle: An Historical and Descriptive Sketch. Totnes: Mortimer Bros.
- Sanders, I. J. (1960). English Baronies. Oxford: Clarendon Press.
- Somers Cocks, J. V. (1977). Devon Topographical Prints 1660–1870. A Catalogue and Guide. Exeter: Devon Library Services. ISBN 0-86114-001-X.
