= Francis Fulford (politician) =

English politician

High Sheriff of Dorset
- In office 1642-1643

Member of Parliament for Devon
- In office 1625
- Preceded by: John Drake; Edward Giles
- Succeeded by: John Drake; John Pole

Personal details
- Born: c. 1583 England
- Died: 1664 (aged 80–81)
- Spouse: Elizabeth Samways
- Children: 13
- Relatives: Richard Bampfield (grandfather); Amias Bampfield (uncle); John Bampfield (cousin); Francis Ashley (brother-in-law)
- Education: Brasenose College, Oxford

Sir Francis Fulford (c. 1583 – 1664) was an English politician who sat in the House of Commons in 1625.

== Biography ==
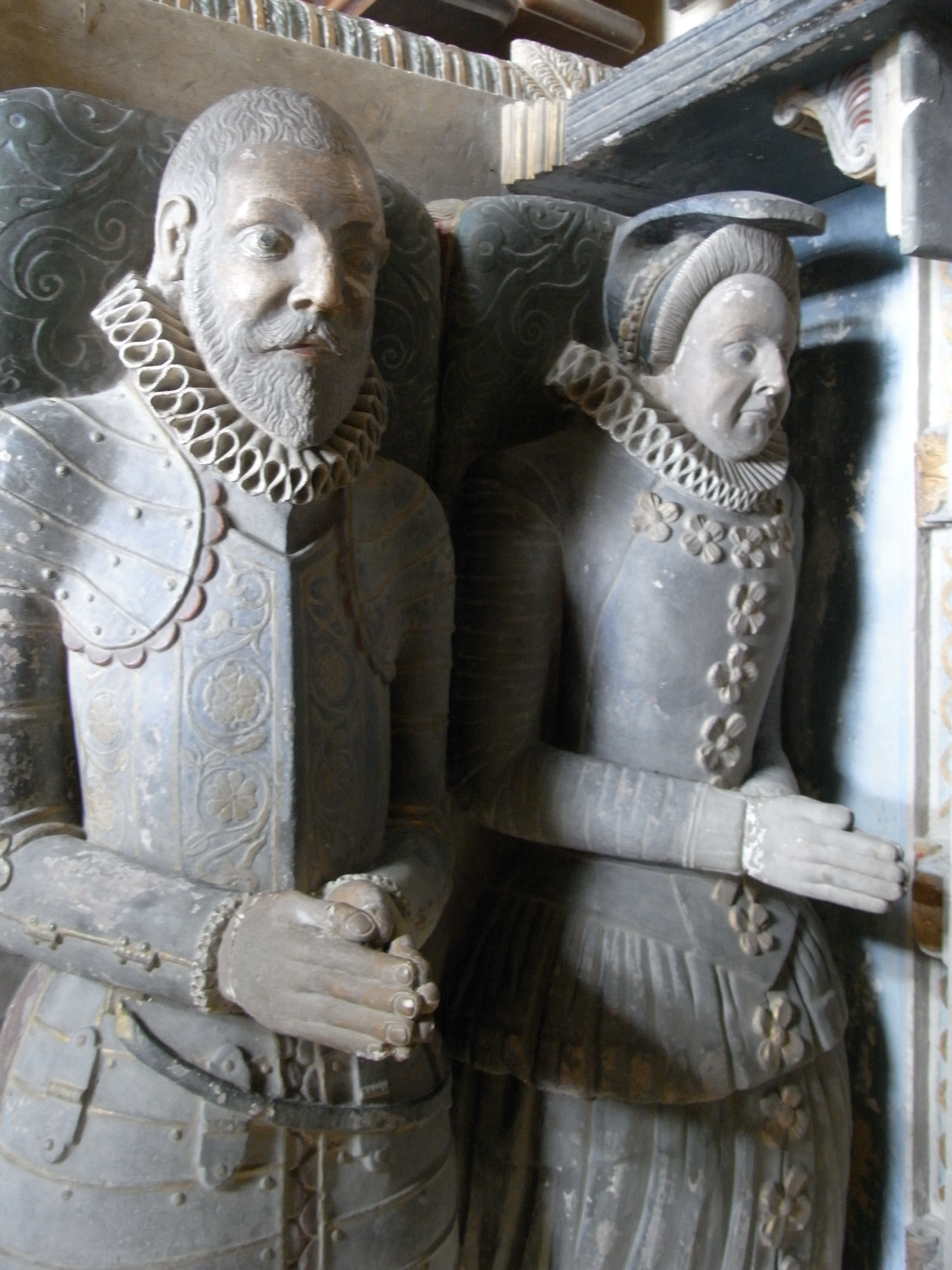
Effigies of Francis Fulford's parents Sir Thomas Fulford and Ursula Bampfield in the Fulford Chapel, Dunsford Church

Fulford was the son of Sir Thomas Fulford (1553-1610) of Fulford in the parish of Dunsford, Devon and Ursula Bampfield (died 1639), daughter of Richard Bampfield of Poltimore, and was baptised at the Church of St Mary Major, Exeter on 1 September 1583. He matriculated at Brasenose College, Oxford on 16 February 1599, aged 15 and was a student of Middle Temple in 1601. He was knighted on 26 February 1606. He succeeded his father in 1610, inheriting the family seat of Great Fulford. His parents' effigy in the Fulford Chapel, Dunsford Church still survives.

In 1625, he was elected member of parliament for Devon. He served as a Deputy Lieutenant of Dorset by 1640 and was appointed High Sheriff of Dorset for 1642–43.

During the English Civil War he was an active royalist and was captured and briefly imprisoned in Devon in early 1643. He maintained a garrison at Great Fulford until December 1645, when he surrendered to Thomas Fairfax. His eldest son Thomas was killed during the war. He was allowed to compound for his estates. Viewed with understandable suspicion by the Cromwellian regime, he lived quietly on his estates until the Restoration of Charles II.

He married Elizabeth, the daughter and co-heiress of Bernard Samways of Winterbourne St. Martin and Toller Fratrum, Dorset, with whom he had 7 sons (several of whom predeceased him) and 6 daughters. The marriage led to a lengthy lawsuit with his brother-in-law Sir Francis Ashley, who married Elizabeth's sister and co-heiress Anne. Fulford died at the age of about 80 between 7 January 1664 when he made his will and 2 May 1664 when it was proved. He was buried at Toller Fratrum. His eldest son having been killed, his Devon estates passed to his grandson Francis and the Dorset estate to his younger son George.

Parliament of England
Preceded by John Drake; Sir Edward Giles	Member of Parliament for Devon; 1625; With: Francis Courtenay	Succeeded by John Drake; John Pole
