= Sir Edward Seymour, 2nd Baronet =

English politician (c. 1580–1659)

- Arms of Seymour of Berry Pomeroy: Gules, two wings conjoined in lure or. The Seymour line of Berry Pomeroy did not inherit the special grant of arms made to the 1st Duke of Somerset, which descended to the children from his second marriage
- Born: c. 1580
- Died: 5 October 1659; Berry Pomeroy
- Spouse: Dorothy Killegrew
- Parent(s): Sir Edward Seymour, 1st Baronet; Elizabeth Champernowne

Sir Edward Seymour, 2nd Baronet (c. 1580 – 5 October 1659) was an English landowner and politician who sat in the House of Commons between 1601 and 1625. He was an ambassador to Denmark. During the English Civil War, he supported the Royalist cause.

== Origins ==
Seymour was the son of Sir Edward Seymour, 1st Baronet (d.1613) of Berry Pomeroy by his wife Elizabeth Champernowne daughter of Sir Arthur Champernowne, of Dartington Hall.

== Career ==
In 1601 he was elected Member of Parliament for Penryn. He was knighted at Greenwich on 22 May 1603, and was sent by James I on an embassy to Denmark. In 1604 he was elected MP for Newport. He succeeded the baronetcy on the death of his father on 11 April 1613 and became governor of Dartmouth in that year. In 1614, he was elected MP for Lyme Regis. He was J.P. for Devon and Vice Admiral of Devon from 1617. In 1621 he was elected MP for Devon. He was elected MP for Callington in 1624 and for Totnes in 1625.

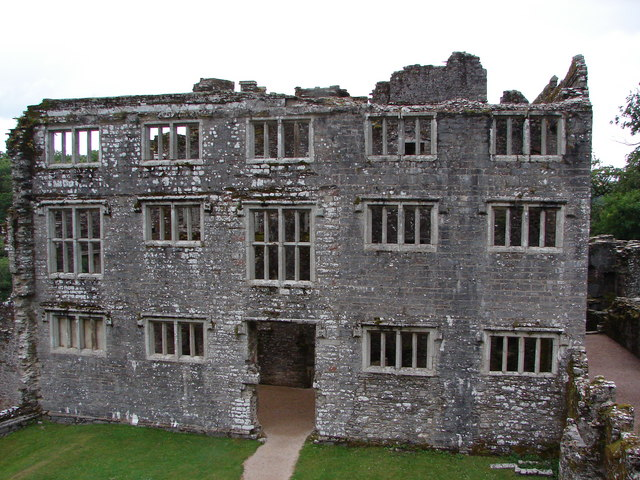
Ruins of Berry Pomeroy Castle

In 1577 he was Colonel of a regiment of the Devon Trained Bands. Seymour became an Admiralty official and privateer and was a Royalist in the civil war. He and his son were captured at Plymouth and Berry Pomeroy Castle was destroyed. He had to pay £1,200 to the sequestrators of estates.

== Marriage and children ==
Seymour married Dorothy Killigrew (d.1643), daughter of Sir Henry Killigrew, of Laroch, and his first wife Catherine Cooke at St Margaret's, Lothbury, London on 15 December 1600. She was buried at Berry Pomeroy on 30 June 1643. They had seven children:

- Sir Edward Seymour, 3rd Baronet (1610–1688)
- Henry Seymour (1612 - 9 March 1686)
- Thomas Seymour, married to Anne Anderson, daughter of Sir Richard Anderson, of Penley, Hertfordshire by his wife Mary Spencer (1588–1658), daughter of Robert Spencer, 1st Baron Spencer.
- Sir Joseph Seymour (11 October 1643), married to Bridget Anderson, daughter of Sir Richard Anderson, of Penley, Hertfordshire.
- Elizabeth Seymour (d. 3 September 1669), married firstly, as his 2nd wife, to Francis Courtenay (1576–1638), de jure 4th Earl of Devon of Powderham, by whom she had issue, and married secondly to Sir Amos Meredyth, 1st Baronet, of Ashley, Cheshire (d. 5 December 1669, interred St. Patrick's Cathedral, Dublin, 10 December 1669)
- Mary Seymour (interred 5 March 1680), married to Sir Jonathan Trelawny, 2nd Baronet, son of Sir John Trelawny, 1st Baronet, and was the mother of Sir Jonathan Trelawny, 3rd Baronet, Bishop of Winchester
- Margaret Seymour, married to Francis Trelawny, son of Sir John Trelawny, 1st Baronet.

== Death and burial ==
Seymour died at Berry Pomeroy on 5 October 1659.

Parliament of England
Preceded by John Killigrew; Edward Jones	Member of Parliament for Penryn; 1601; With: Richard Messenger	Succeeded by Sir Richard Warburton; Thomas Prowse
Preceded by Tobie Matthew; Sir John Leigh	Member of Parliament for Newport; 1604–1611; With: Sir Robert Killigrew	Succeeded by Thomas Trevor; Sir Thomas Cheek
Preceded by Sir Francis Russell; George Jeffreys	Member of Parliament for Lyme Regis; 1614; With: George Browne	Succeeded by John Poulett; Robert Hassard
Preceded by John Drake; Edward Giles	Member of Parliament for Devon; 1621; With: John Drake	Succeeded by John Drake; Sir William Strode
Preceded by Henry Rolle; Lord Wriothesley	Member of Parliament for Callington; 1624; With: Henry Rolle	Succeeded by Sir Richard Weston; Thomas Wise
Preceded by Sir Edward Giles; Arthur Champernoun	Member of Parliament for Totnes; 1625; With: Sir Edward Giles	Succeeded by Arthur Champernoun; Philip Holditch
Baronetage of England
Preceded by Sir Edward Seymour, 1st Baronet	Baronet of Berry Pomeroy; 1613–1659	Succeeded by Sir Edward Seymour, 3rd Baronet
