= Richard Bampfield =

Sheriff of Devon

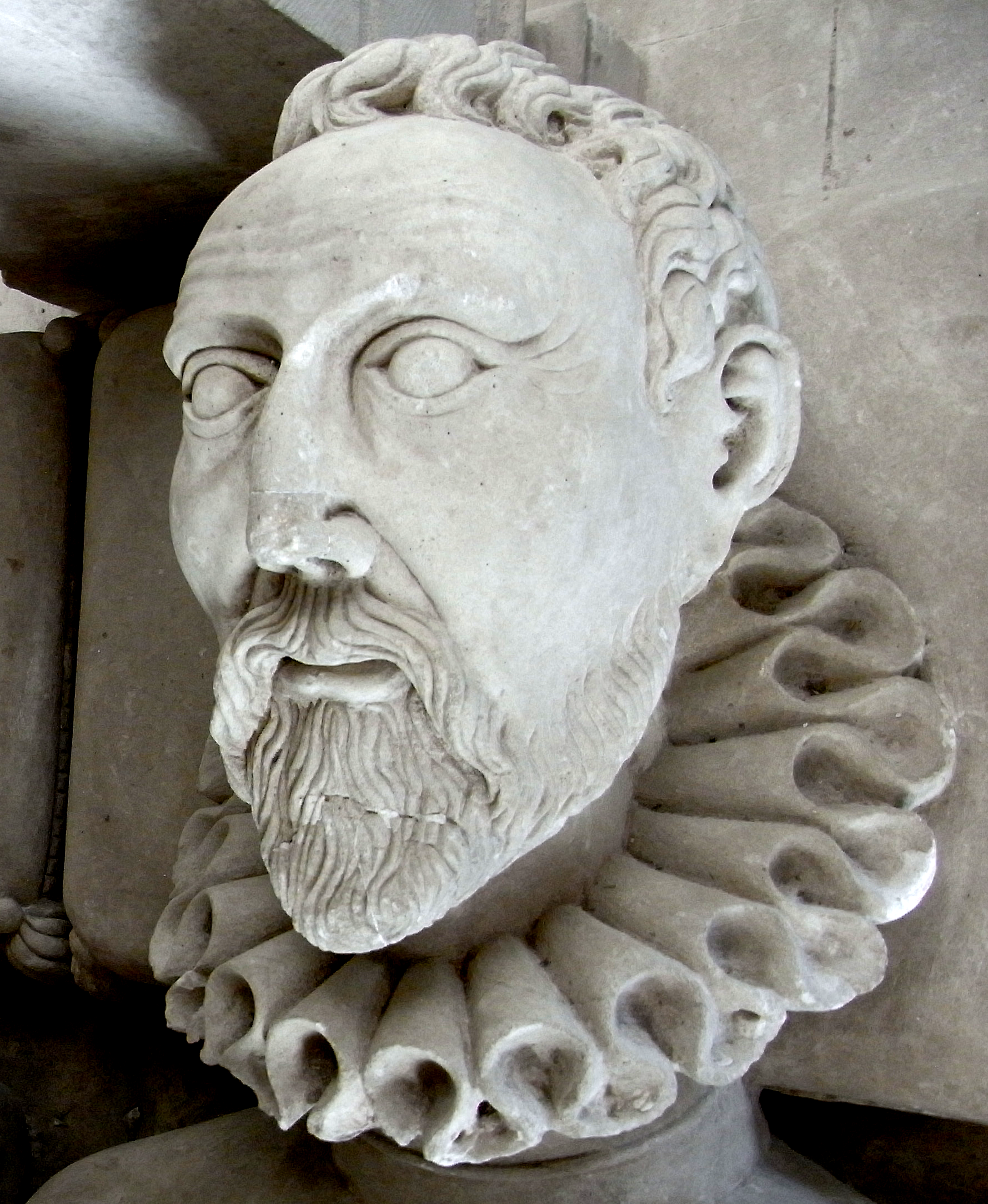
- Richard Bampfield, detail from his effigy in Poltimore Church

Sheriff of Devon
- In office 1576

Personal details
- Born: 1526 England
- Died: 1594 (aged 67–68)
- Spouse: Elizabeth Sydenham
- Children: 12, including Amias
- Relatives: Nicholas Wadham (grandfather); Francis Fulford (grandson); John Bampfield (grandson)

Arms of Bampfield: Or, on a bend gules three mullets argent

Richard Bampfield (1526–1594) of Poltimore and Bampfylde House in Exeter, both in Devon, was Sheriff of Devon in 1576. He began construction of the Tudor era Poltimore House in 1550, and completed the building of Bampfylde House, Exeter, along with The Great House, Bristol one of the finest Elizabethan townhouses in the West Country, in 1590. He is the ancestor of the Bampfylde Baronets and Barons Poltimore.

== Origins ==
He was the eldest son and heir of Sir Edward Bampfield (died 1528) of Poltimore by his wife Elizabeth Wadham, the widow of John Warre of Chipleigh (see Chipley Park, Somerset), second son of Sir Richard Warre of Hestercombe, and a daughter of Sir Nicholas Wadham (died 1542) of Merryfield, Ilton in Somerset and of Edge, Branscombe in Devon. The Bampfield family had been seated at Poltimore since the 13th century.

== Career ==
Bampfield's father died when he was two years of age, and the 18th-century genealogist Thomas Wotton related this tradition about his childhood: (Note: Charles Worthy, in his Devonshire Wills of 1896 attributes the "sensational story" to one related by John Prince in his Worthies of Devon (first published in 1701), that Prince described as "a most memorable passage, of undoubted credit, which happened to one of the heirs of this house, not many generations back".)

...he became a prey to some great person, who carried him into a distant country, and bred him up in the drudgery of the family, concealing from him his quality and estate, and at last made him his huntsman; but one of his tenants, (being his nurse's husband,) discovering where he was detained, made him acquainted with his fortune; the truth of which he convinced him of, by a remarkable mole which he had in his back, and brought him away privately to Brimpton (the seat of John Sydenham, Esq; who assisted him in his return to Poltimore, and soon after gave him his daughter in marriage.) In confirmation of which, he lieth at length with a hound at his feet, under a monument in Poltimore church...

However, the editor of the 1771 edition of Wotton's genealogy added "Having received no account from the family, concerning this particular, I do not presume to give it as authentic."

== Marriage and children ==
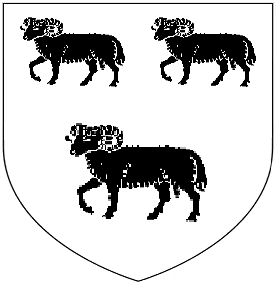
Arms of Sydenham: Argent, three rams passant guardant sable

He married Elizabeth Sydenham (died 1599), daughter of Sir John Sydenham of Brympton d'Evercy, Somerset, by his wife Ursula Brydges, a daughter of Sir Giles Brydges (c. 1462 – 1511) of Coberley, Gloucestershire, and sister of John Brydges, 1st Baron Chandos (1492–1557). Her niece Elizabeth Sydenham was the wife of Admiral Sir Francis Drake (c. 1540 – 1596). By his wife he had three sons and nine daughters as follows:

=== Sons ===
- Giles Bampfield, eldest son and heir apparent, who died childless during his father's lifetime on a voyage to Ireland.
- Sir Amyas Bampfylde (1564–1626), second and eldest surviving son and heir, of Poltimore and North Molton, Devon. He was Member of Parliament for Devon in 1597, Sheriff of Devon from 1603 to 1604 and a Deputy Lieutenant in 1616. In 1576 he married Elizabeth Clifton, daughter of Sir John Clifton of Barrington Court, Somerset. His monument and effigy survive in North Molton Church. He is the ancestor of the Bampfylde Baronets and Barons Poltimore.
- Richard Bampfield, third son.

=== Daughters ===
- Elizabeth Bampfield, eldest daughter, who married (as his second wife) George Cary (1543–1601) of Clovelly, Devon, Sheriff of Devon in 1587. Without children.
- Johanna Bampfield, second daughter. She is apparently confused in Vivian (1895) with her aunt Joane Bampfield, successively wife of Sir Richard Pollard of Way, St Giles in the Wood and then of Hugh Giffard, of St Giles, third son of Sir Roger Giffard (died 1547) of Brightley, Chittlehampton.
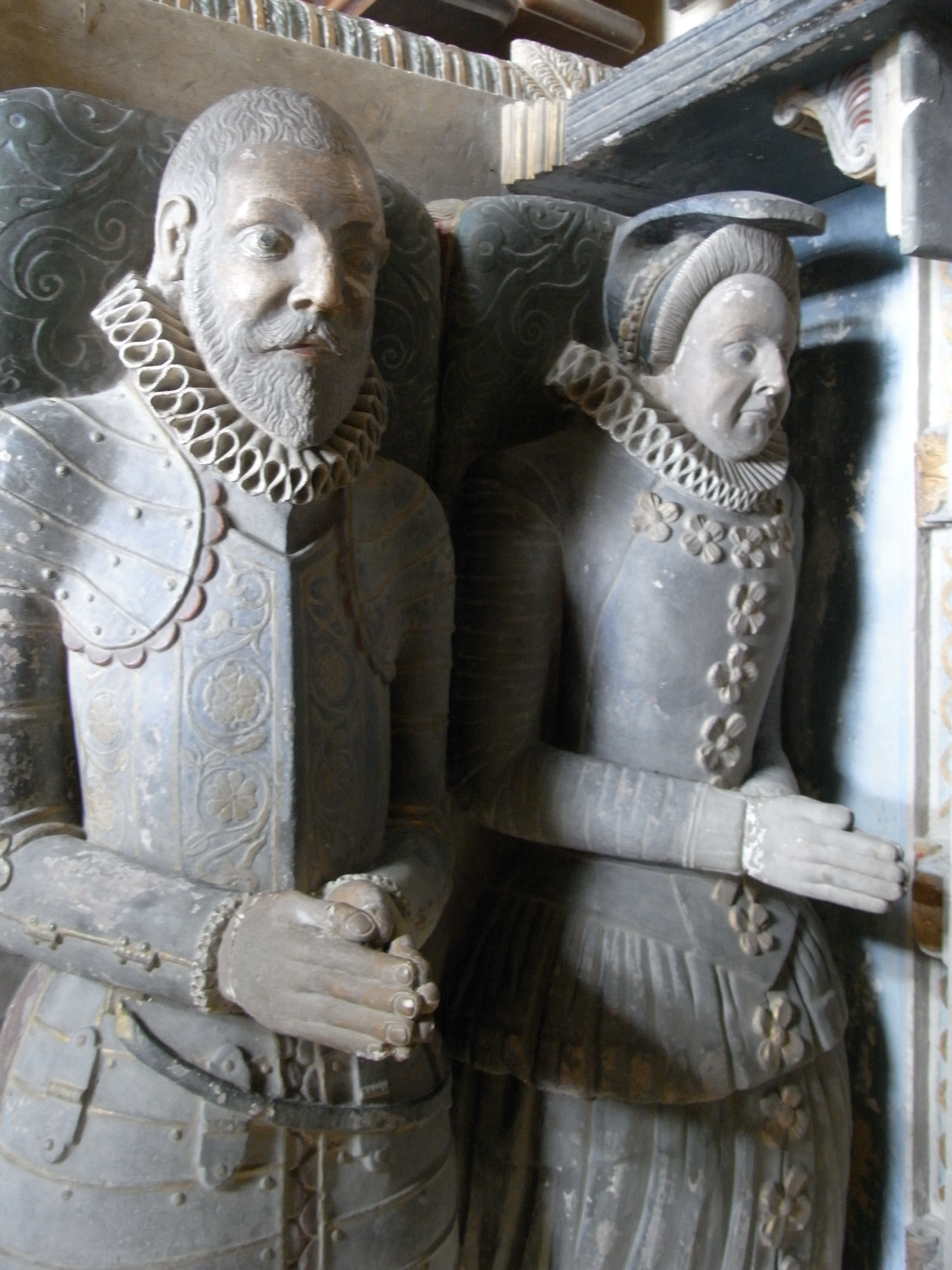
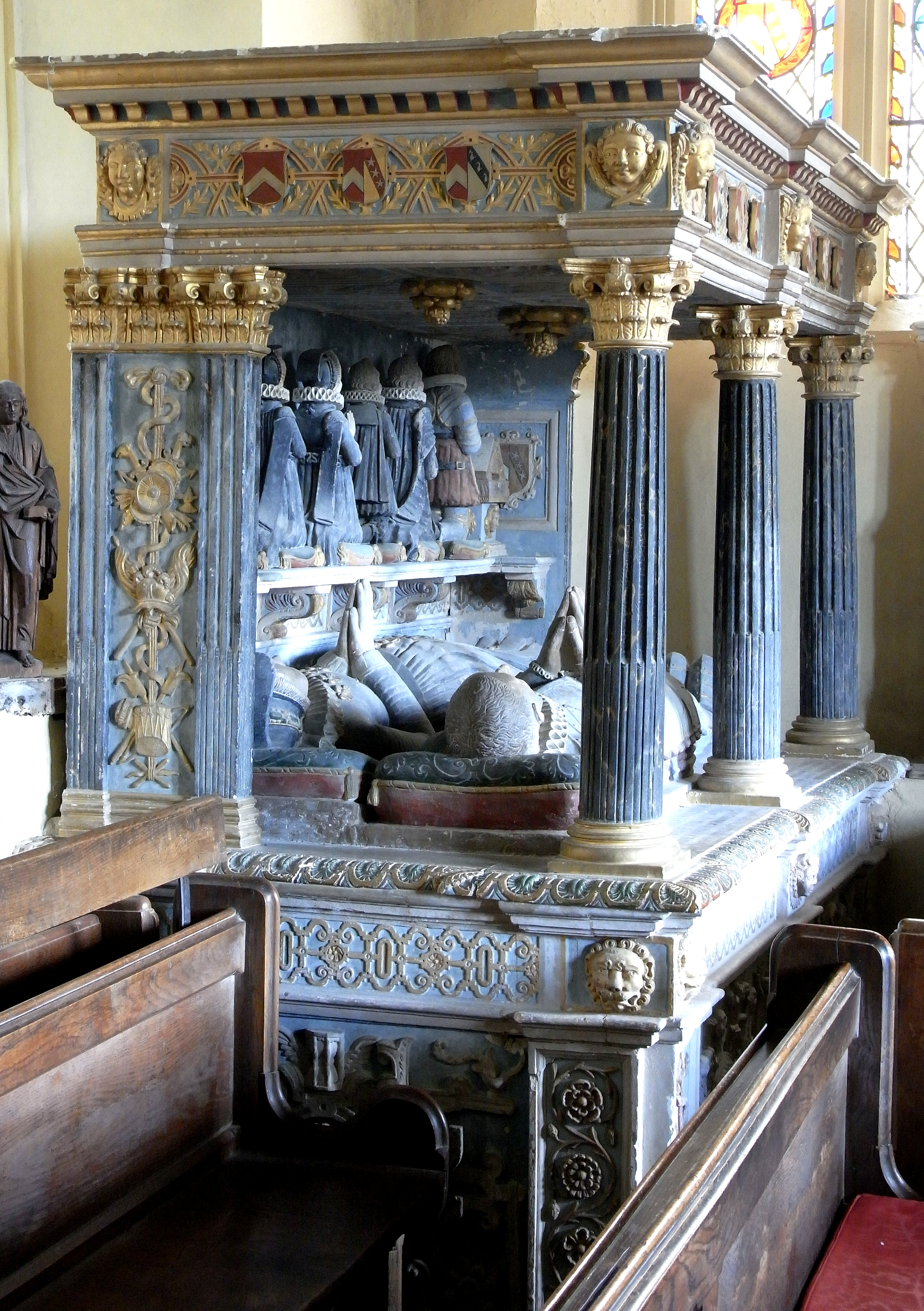
Effigies of Sir Thomas Fulford (1553–1610) and his wife Ursula Bampfield, detail from his monument (right) in the Fulford Chapel of Dunsford Church. The arms of Fulford impaling Bampfield are visible on the cornice of the monument and on the cornice of the monument to her father in Poltimore Church
- Ursula Bampfield, third daughter, wife of Sir Thomas Fulford (1553–1610) of Great Fulford, Dunsford, Devon. Her effigy with that of her husband survive in Dunsford Church. They were the parents of Sir Francis Fulford.
- Susanna Bampfield, fourth daughter, wife firstly of John Hays of Myll in Witheridge and secondly of Simcock.
- Marie Bampfield, fifth daughter, wife firstly of Humphry Moore of Moore Hayes, Cullompton and secondly of Rev. Richard Bowden, parson of Okehampton.
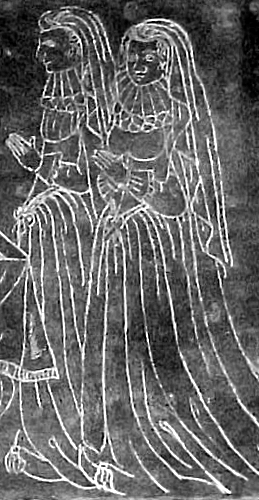
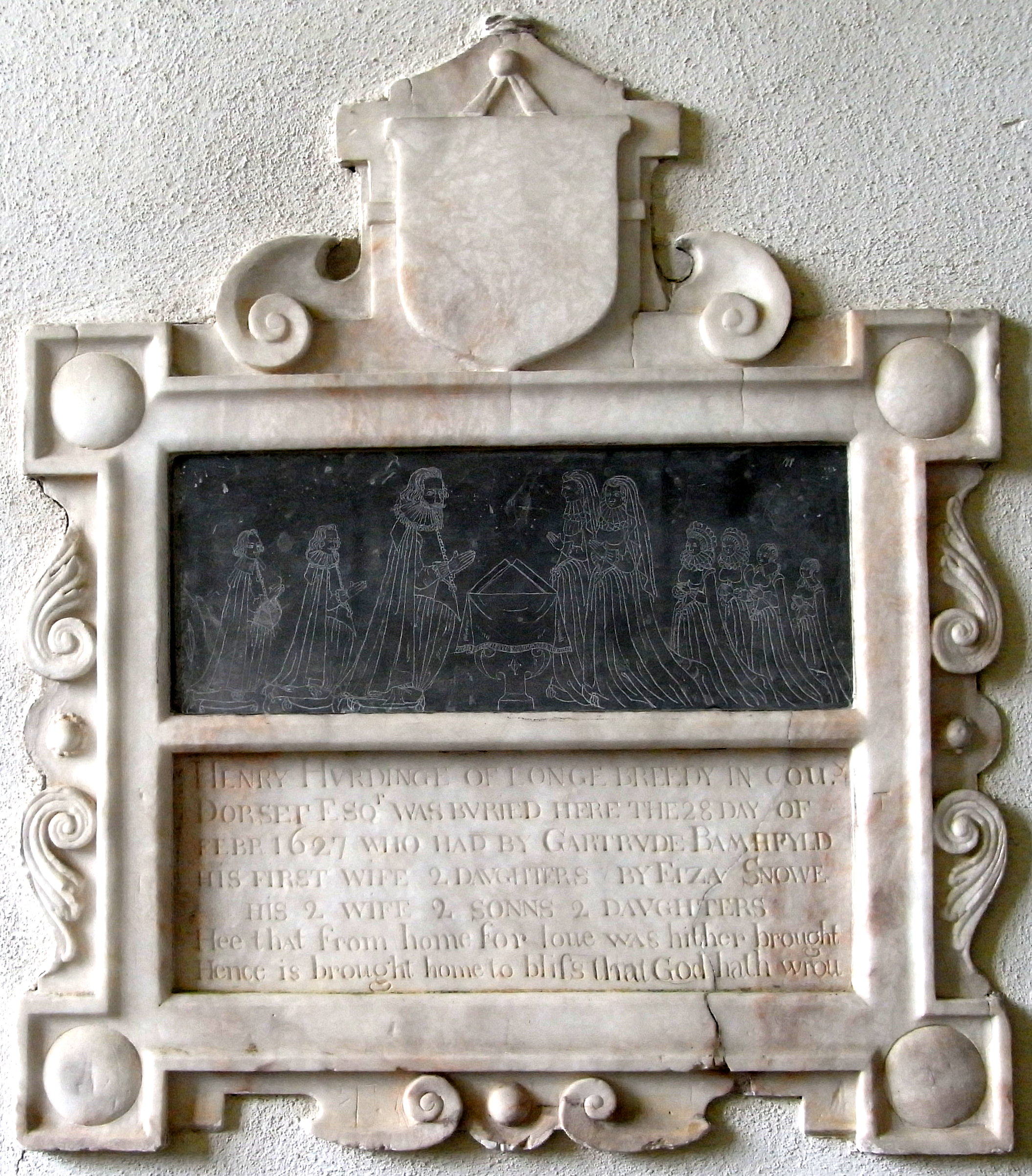
Right: mural monument to Henry Hurding (died 1627) in Monkleigh Church, Devon, with Gertrude Bampfield depicted as one of his two wives (left) with two of her daughters kneeling behind
- Gertrude Bampfield, sixth daughter, wife of Henry Hurding (died 1627) of Long Bredy, Dorset, by whom she had two daughters, including Elizabeth Hurding (died 1668) who married firstly John Coffin (died 1622), of Portledge, lord of the manors of Alwington and Monkleigh, and secondly Hugh Prust (died 1666) of Annery, Monkleigh. She is depicted on her husband's surviving mural monument in Monkleigh Church, Devon, etched as a kneeling lady with four kneeling girls behind, on a slate tablet inscribed:

Henry Hurdinge of Longe Breedy in Cou^{y.} Dorset, Esq^{r} was buried here the 28-day of Febr. 1627 who had by Gartrude Bampfyld his first wife 2 daughters. By Eliza Snowe his 2 wife, 2 sonns 2 daughters.

"Hee that from home for love was hither brought",
"Hence is brought home to bliss that God hath wrou(ght)"

- Anna Bampfield, seventh daughter, wife firstly of Christopher Morgan of Maperton, Berkshire, secondly a member of the Luttrell family.
- Katherin Bampfield, eighth daughter, unmarried.
- Margaret Bampfield, ninth daughter, wife of William Lacy of Hartrow, Somerset.

==== Heraldry of female descendants ====
Compilation of 8 escutcheons displayed on cornice of monument to Richard Bampfield in Poltimore Church, showing arms of various Bampfield sons-in-law

On the cornice of the monument to Richard Bampfield in Poltimore Church, are displayed 8 painted escutcheons depicting the arms of 5 of his sons-in-law, each impaling Bampfield, and 3 sons-in-law of his son and heir Sir Amias Bampfylde, each impaling Bampfield. Left to right on cornice:
1:Fulford of Great Fulford: Gules, a chevron argent
2:Argent, a bend sable
3:Gules, two bars wavy ermine
4:Argent, on a chevron azure three roses of the field
5:Cary of Clovelly: Argent, on a bend sable three roses of the field
6:Dodderidge of Bremridge (son-in-law of Sir Amias Bampfield): Argent, two pales wavy azure between nine cross croslets gules
7:Hancock of Combe Martin (son-in-law of Sir Amias Bampfield): Gules, on a chief argent three cocks of the field.
8:Drake of Buckland Abbey (son-in-law of Sir Amias Bampfield): Sable, a fess wavy between two pole-stars Arctic and Antarctic argent

== Monument in Poltimore Church ==
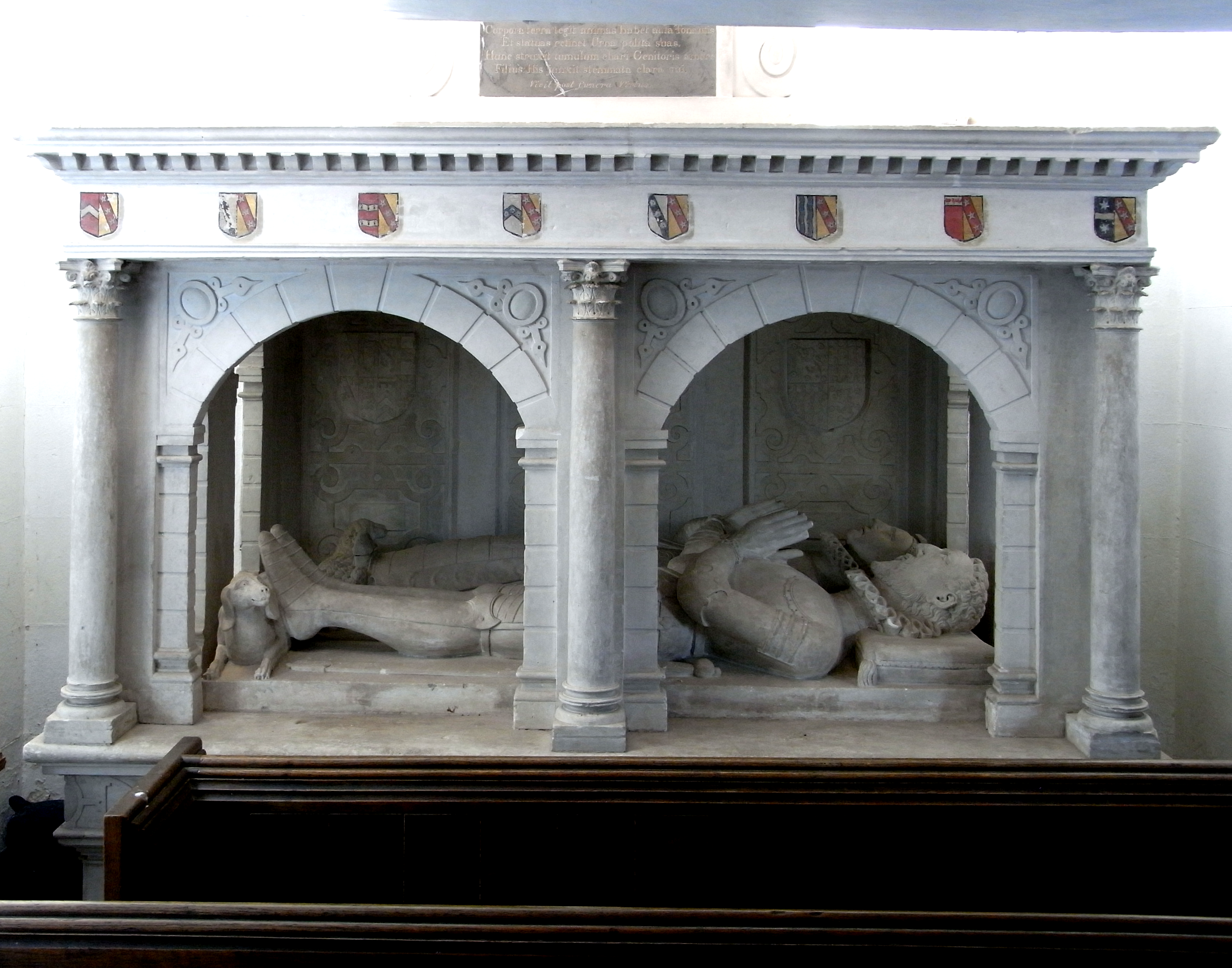
Monument to Richard Bampfield in Poltimore Church

Richard Bampfield's monument, erected in 1604 by his son Amias Bampfield, survives in the south transept of Poltimore Church. It comprises two recumbent stone effigies, of Richard Bampfield and his wife, under a low canopy supported by arched openings and columns. A view of the monument is obstructed by pews in front and by the balcony above forming the manorial pew of the Bampfield family. The 8 painted escutcheons on the cornice depict the arms of 5 of his 8 sons-in-law, each impaling Bampfield, and the 3 sons-in-law of his son and heir Sir Amias Bampfylde, each impaling Bampfield.

== Sources ==
- Vivian, Lt.Col. J.L., (Ed.) The Visitations of the County of Devon: Comprising the Heralds' Visitations of 1531, 1564 & 1620, Exeter, 1895
