= Great Fosters =

Country house in Egham, Surrey, England

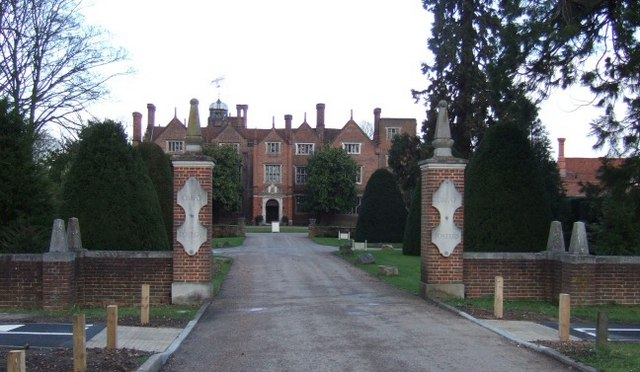
- Great Fosters

- Location within Surrey
- 51°25′01″N 0°32′41″W
- Location: Egham, Surrey
- OS grid reference: TQ0131369697

History
- Built: c. 1550

Site notes
- Area: 7 ha (17 acres)

Listed Building – Grade I
- Official name: Great Fosters
- Designated: 11 July 1951
- Reference no.: 1294166

National Register of Historic Parks and Gardens
- Official name: Great Fosters
- Designated: 1 July 1988
- Reference no.: 1000303

Listed Building – Grade II
- Official name: Great Fosters Residential Block
- Designated: 17 Nov 1986
- Reference no.: 1189680

Listed Building – Grade II
- Official name: Great Fosters Barn
- Designated: 11 July 1951
- Reference no.: 1028959

Great Fosters is a 16th-century mansion which originally lay within Windsor Great Park and is still adjacent to the town of Egham, Surrey, England. It is a Grade I listed building, close to Heathrow and the M25 London orbital motorway.

It has been listed Grade I on the National Heritage List for England since July 1951, and its gardens and parkland have been Grade II* listed on the Register of Historic Parks and Gardens since July 1988. The grounds are also home to a 17th-century Grade II listed barn which was reconstructed on the site from its original home in a field in Malden, Surrey. The Grade II listed former stables date from the 16th century and are now used as a conference centre.

The formal gardens of Great Fosters were laid out in 1918 by W. H. Romaine-Walker in partnership with Gilbert Henry Jenkins; the pair also extended the house.

== History ==
Great Fosters was the London seat of Sir John Dodderidge (1555–1628), a judge of the King's Bench and formerly Solicitor General to King James I. He had been brought up in Barnstaple, in North Devon, and purchased the estate of Bremridge near South Molton, Devon, as his country estate. His epitaph on his monument in Exeter Cathedral states "He departed this lyfe at Forsters nere Egha(m) in Surrey". Sir Robert Foster owned the house in 1639. When he died in 1663 he left the house to his son, Sir Thomas Foster. Great Fosters remained in the family following his death in 1685 when it passed to his daughters. In 1715, Sir Charles Orbey resided here, and it was not until 1787 that one of Sir Thomas’ great grandsons sold the property to a Mr Wyatt for £700.

In 1818 Great Fosters was sold to Dr George Frederick Furnivall (father of Frederick Furnivall), Sir John Chapman (one of the 300 founder members of the Royal College of Surgeons) and another partner, who operated it as a lunatic asylum. Chapman was one of the "modern thinkers" who believed mental illness was not solely related to physical illness, and Furnivall was described in local documentation as "Doctor to the Poor" in Windsor.

Although not confirmed by Windsor Castle records, it is said that King George III was treated at Great Fosters towards the end of his life.

Early in the 20th century, Great Fosters was owned by Baroness Halkett, Queen Alexandra's lady in waiting. Later it passed to the Earl of Dudley and then to the Hon. Gerald Montague. The estate was purchased by Harold Sutcliffe in 1931 and owned by the Sutcliffe family until late 2018 when it was purchased by the current owners, Alexander Hotels. The building is now a 5-star hotel with a Michelin starred restaurant.

== The house ==
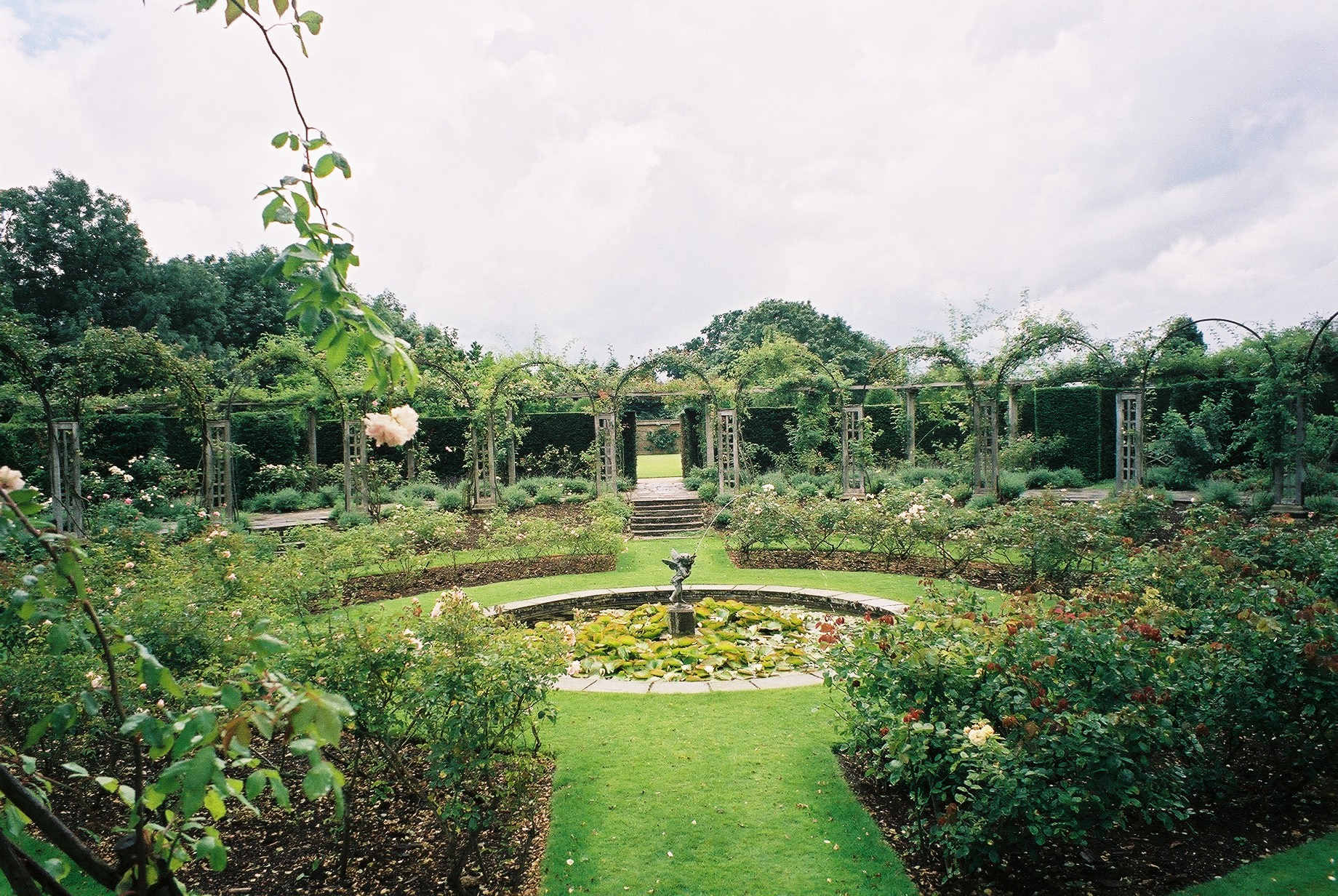
Gardens at Great Fosters

In about 1550, the original house was built as a symmetrical U-shaped Elizabethan homestead. It is probable that it was extended in the early 17th century because there is slightly larger brickwork in the porch. It was at this time the initial tall chimneys were built. However, these were removed during World War II after a bomb blast. They have been replaced by replicas.

A dominant feature of the house is the windows, all of which have stone mullions and transoms with leaded lights.

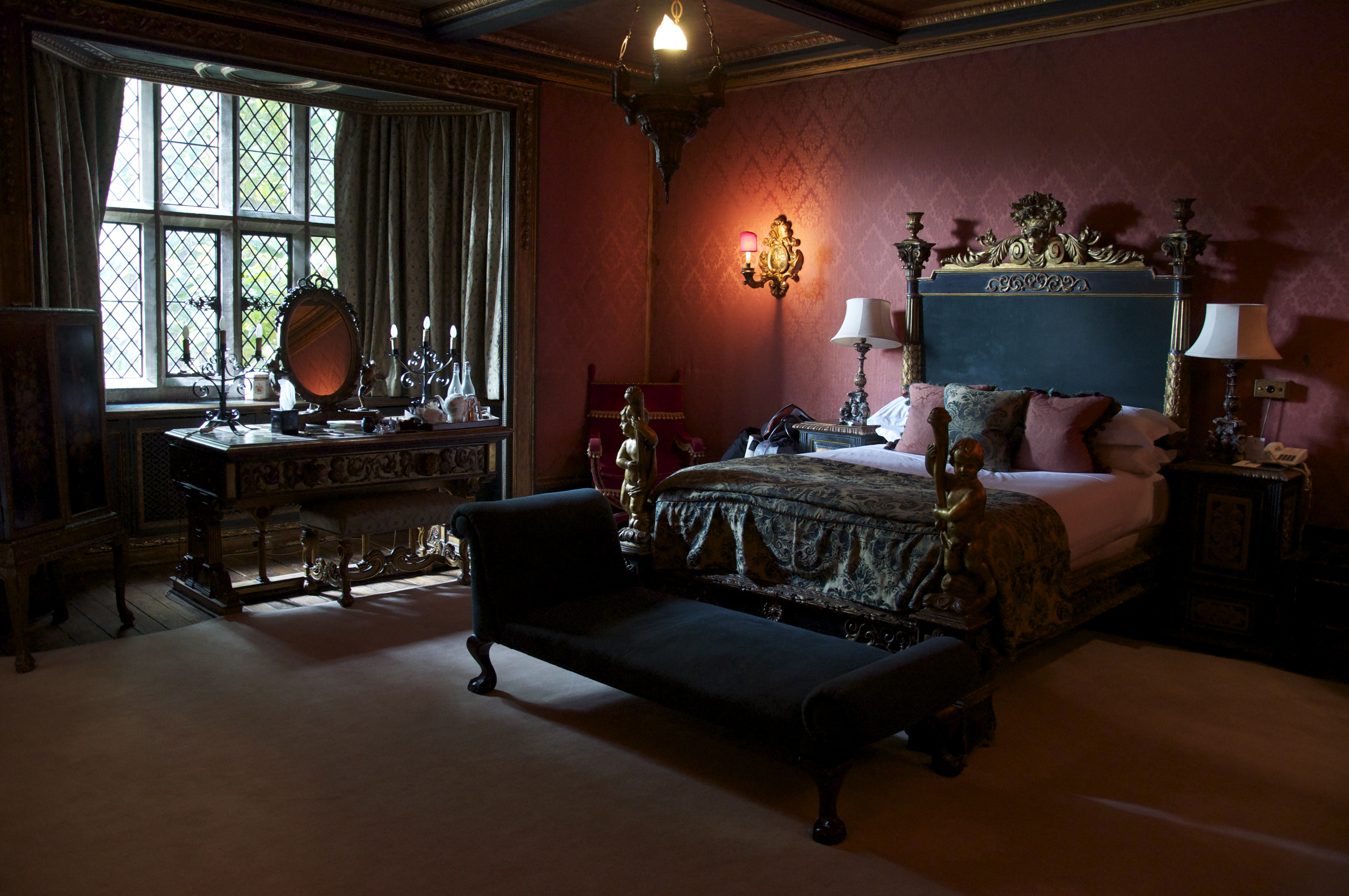
The "Italian Suite"

== In popular culture ==
The front of the house was used in the opening title sequence of the 1950s TV comedy series Whack-O! set at a minor public school. It was also used in the 1958 Rank Organisation film about the Titanic, A Night to Remember.

== Visit of Elizabeth I ==
Elizabeth I’s 1598 crest adorns the entryway of Great Fosters and likely marks the year when the queen visited. In the summer, she and her court toured the English countryside for months at a time in journeys called "progresses". The court left London to escape the disease and heat that settled over the city in the summer. But Elizabeth I also reinforced her power. Her showy retinue and public fêtes made her reign personal even for peasants who lived far from London. As she visited favored members of the nobility, she strengthened alliances and built bonds of mutual indebtedness.
