= Thomas Prestwood =

English politician

Thomas Prestwood (c. 1570 – 1655) was an English politician who sat in the House of Commons from 1628 to 1629.

Prestwood was the son of George Prestwood of Whetcombe, Devon. He matriculated at Broadgates Hall, Oxford on 18 March 1608, aged 15 and was awarded BA on 6 November 1610. He was a student of Middle Temple in 1611. In 1628, he was elected member of parliament for Totnes and sat until 1629 when King Charles decided to rule without parliament for eleven years.

Parliament of England
Preceded by Arthur Champernoun; Philip Holditch	Member of Parliament for Totnes; 1628–1629; With: Sir Edward Giles	Parliament suspended until 1640
