= John Drake (died 1628) =

English politician

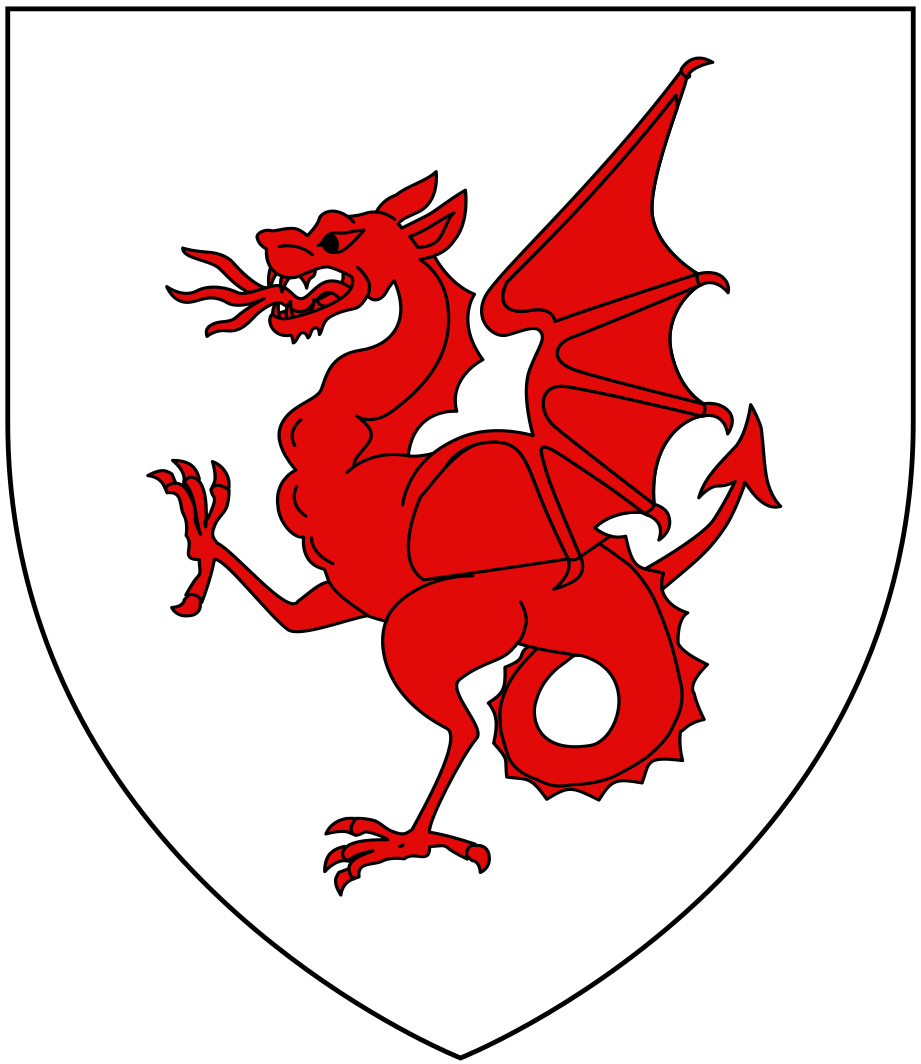
- Arms of Drake of Ash: Argent, a wyvern wings displayed and tail nowed gules
- Born: c 1556
- Died: 11 April 1628; Musbury
- Spouse: Dorothy Button
- Parent: Sir Bernard Drake

John Drake (c.1556 – 11 April 1628) was an English politician who sat in the House of Commons at various times between 1614 and 1626.

Drake was the eldest son of Sir Bernard Drake, of Ash and Mount Drake, Devon. He matriculated at Hart Hall, Oxford in 1573, aged 17 and studied law at the Middle Temple in 1578. He succeeded his father in 1586.

He sat on the bench as justice of the peace for Devon by 1601 to his death and for Dorset from 1614 to his death. He was appointed High Sheriff of Devon for 1604–05 and deputy-lieutenant for Devon from 1614 to his death.

He was a member of the Virginia Company from 1612 and the New England Company from 1620.

In 1614, he was elected member of parliament for Devon. He was re-elected MP for Devon in 1621 and 1624. In 1625 he was elected MP for Lyme Regis. He was elected MP for Devon again in 1626.

Drake died and was buried at Musbury the same day on 11 April 1628. In or before 1585 he had married Dorothy, the daughter of William Button MP of Alton Priors, Wiltshire, with whom he had two sons and a daughter: John Drake (1591–1636), Mary Drake (1594–1643) and William Drake (1596–1640).

Parliament of England
Preceded by Sir Edward Seymour, 1st Baronet; Sir John Acland	Member of Parliament for Devon; 1614–1624; With: Sir Edward Giles	Succeeded by Sir Francis Fulford; Francis Courtenay
Preceded by Sir John Drake; William Wynn	Member of Parliament for Lyme Regis; 1625; With: Thomas Paramour	Succeeded by Thomas Paramour; Sir Walter Erle
Preceded by Francis Fulford; Francis Courtenay	Member of Parliament for Devon; 1626; With: John Pole	Succeeded by John Bampfield; Sir Francis Drake, 1st Baronet
