= Arthur Champernowne (died c. 1650) =

English politician

Arthur Champernowne (1580–c. 1650), of Dartington, near Totnes, Devon was an English politician. He was the son of Gawine Champernowne and Roberte de Montgomery. He married Bridget Fulford, daughter of Sir Thomas Fulford, of Great Fulford in Devon on 17 June 1598 in Dunsford. His son was Captain Francis Champernoun of York, Maine.

He was a Member (MP) of the Parliament of England for Totnes in 1624 and 1626.

He was buried in the old parish church at Dartington.
