= Amyas Bampfylde =

Member of the Parliament of England

Sir Amyas Bampfylde
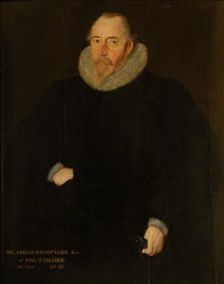
- Sir Amyas Bampfylde (died 1626), portrait by Robert Peake the elder (ca. 1551–1619), inscribed: "Sir Amias Baumfylde Knt. of Poltimore, ob. 1625 aet. 65". Collection of National Trust, displayed at Antony House, Cornwall

Sheriff of Devon
- In office 1603-1604

Member of Parliament for Devon
- In office 1597
- Preceded by: Thomas Dennys; Edward Seymour
- Succeeded by: William Courtenay; Edward Seymour

Justice of the Peace for Devon
- In office 1596 - ?

Personal details
- Born: 1560 England
- Died: 9 February 1626 (aged 65–66) Cottonheath, England
- Spouse: Elizabeth Clifton (m. 1576)
- Children: 10, including John
- Parent: Richard Bampfield (father)
- Relatives: Gervase Clifton (brother-in-law); John Doddridge (son-in-law)
- Education: Exeter College, Oxford
- Occupation: Politician

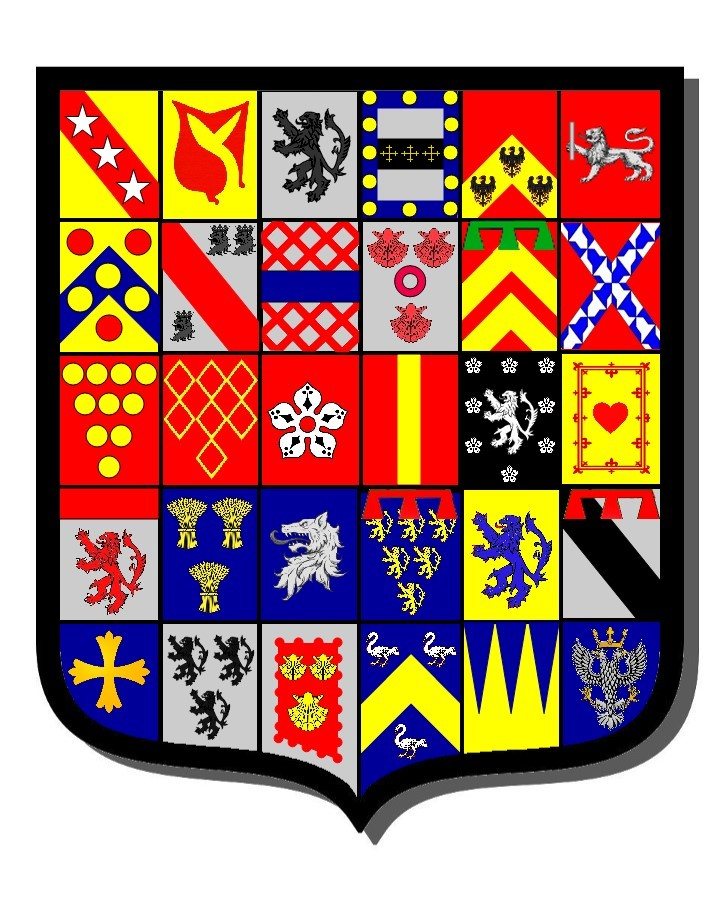
Sir Amyas Bampfylde, Coat of Arms quartered

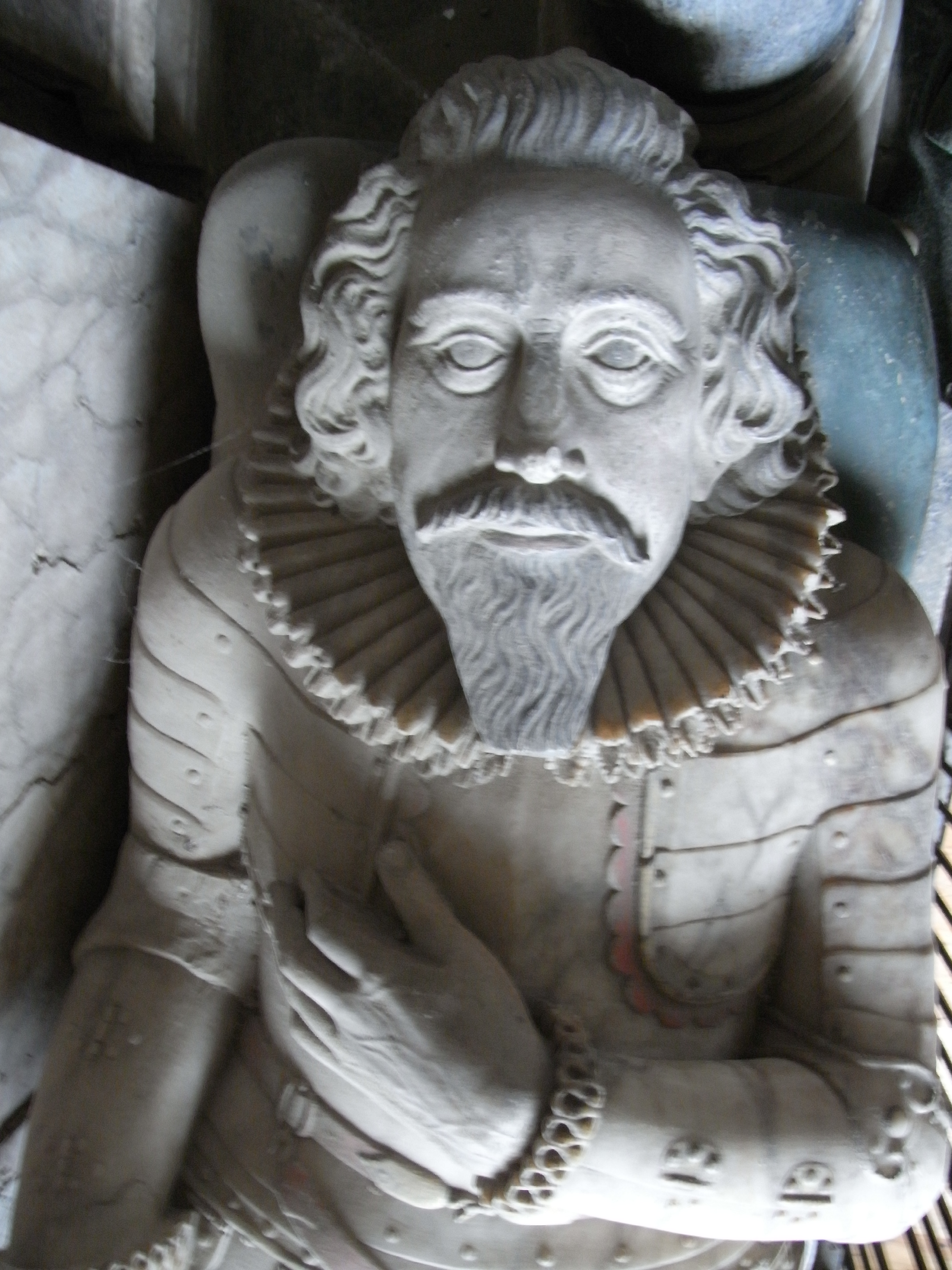
Effigy of Sir Amyas Bampfylde, North Molton Church

Arms of Bampfylde: Or, on a bend gules three mullets argent

Sir Amyas Bampfylde (also spelled Amias Bampfield; 1560 – 9 February 1626) of Poltimore and North Molton in Devon, was an English politician who served as a Member of Parliament for Devon in 1597.

== Origins ==
Bampfylde was the son of Richard Bampfield (1526–1594) and Elizabeth Sydenham (d. 1599), His father served as the Sheriff of Devon in 1576, and held estates at Poltimore and Bampfylde House in Exeter. His mother was the daughter of Sir John Sydenham of Brympton d'Evercy, Somerset..

== Education and Career ==
Bampfylde matriculated at Exeter College, Oxford, on 3 December 1575 at the age of 15. He studied law at the Middle Temple in 1576. He succeeded to the manor of Poltimore on the death of his father in 1594. He was JP for Devon from 1596. In 1597, he was elected Member of Parliament for Devon. He was knighted at Windsor on 9 July 1603. He was Sheriff of Devon from 1603 to 1604. In 1616 he was Deputy Lieutenant.

== Marriage and children ==
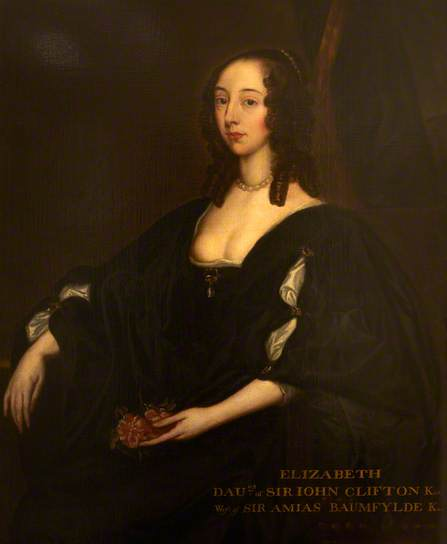
Portrait circa 1640 of Elizabeth Clifton, wife of Sir Amyas Bampfylde. "Style of Anthony van Dyck", property of Trustees of Antony House, Cornwall

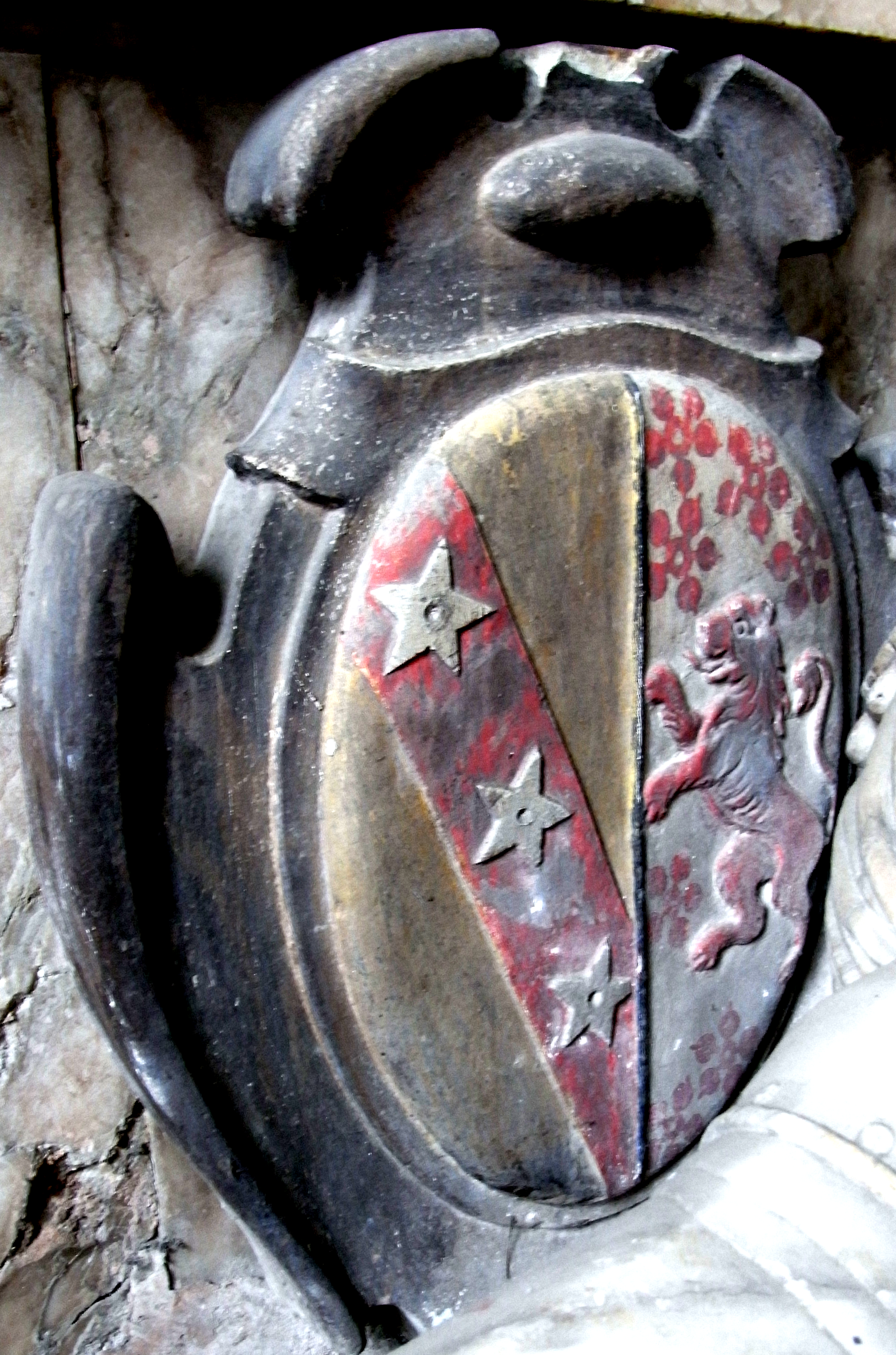
Arms of Bampfield impaling Clifton (Argent semée of cinquefoils pierced gules, a lion rampant of the second), representing the marriage of Sir Amyas Bampfylde and Elizabeth Clifton. Detail from monument to Sir Amyas Bampfylde in All Saints' Church, North Molton

In 1576 Bampfylde married Elizabeth Clifton, a daughter of Sir John Clifton (died 1593) of Barrington Court, Somerset, by his wife Anne Stanley, daughter of Thomas Stanley, 2nd Baron Monteagle (1507–1560). Sir John Clifton's father was a London merchant, Sir William Clifton (died 1564), who had purchased the manor of Barrington from Henry Grey, 1st Duke of Suffolk. Elizabeth Clifton's brother was Gervase Clifton, 1st Baron Clifton (c. 1570 – 1618).

Her portrait circa 1640, in the style of Anthony van Dyck, survives in the collection of Antony House, Cornwall and her stone-sculpted effigy sits in mourning next to the recumbent one of her husband in North Molton Church, on which monument are depicted the arms of Bampfylde impaling Clifton: Argent semée of cinquefoils pierced gules, a lion rampant of the last.

By his wife he had six sons and four daughters as follows:

=== Sons ===
- John Bampfylde (c. 1586 – c. 1657), eldest son and heir, of Poltimore and North Molton, MP for Tiverton (1621) and Devon (1628–9). In 1602 Sir Amyas Bampfylde and Thomas Drake, brother and heir of Admiral Sir Francis Drake, made a double marriage settlement for Bampfylde's eldest son John Bampfylde, then aged 14, and his daughter Jane Bampfield, then aged 16, who were to marry Drake's daughter and son, with each parent settling £660 on the other's daughter.
- Richard Bampfield, second son, died without children.
- William Bampfield, third son.
- Amyas Bampfield, fourth son, of Weston Bampfield.
- Edward Bampfield, fifth son, of Stoke Canon.
- James Bampfield (died 1664), sixth son, Rector of Black Torrington.

=== Daughters ===
- Dorothy Bampfield (died 1614), wife successively of Edward Hancock (died 1603), MP, lord of the manor of Combe Martin, Devon, and later wife of Sir John Doddridge (1555–1628), of Bremridge, near North Molton, Justice of the King's Bench.
- Jane Bampfield, wife of Francis Drake, son of Francis Drake of Buckland. In 1602 Sir Amyas Bampfylde and Thomas Drake, brother and heir of Admiral Sir Francis Drake, made a double marriage settlement for Bampfylde's eldest son John Bampfylde, then aged 14, and a daughter, then aged 16, who were to marry Drake's daughter and son, with each parent settling £660 on the other's daughter.
- Anne Bampfield, died without children.
- Elizabeth Bampfield, died without children.

==== Monument to daughter ====
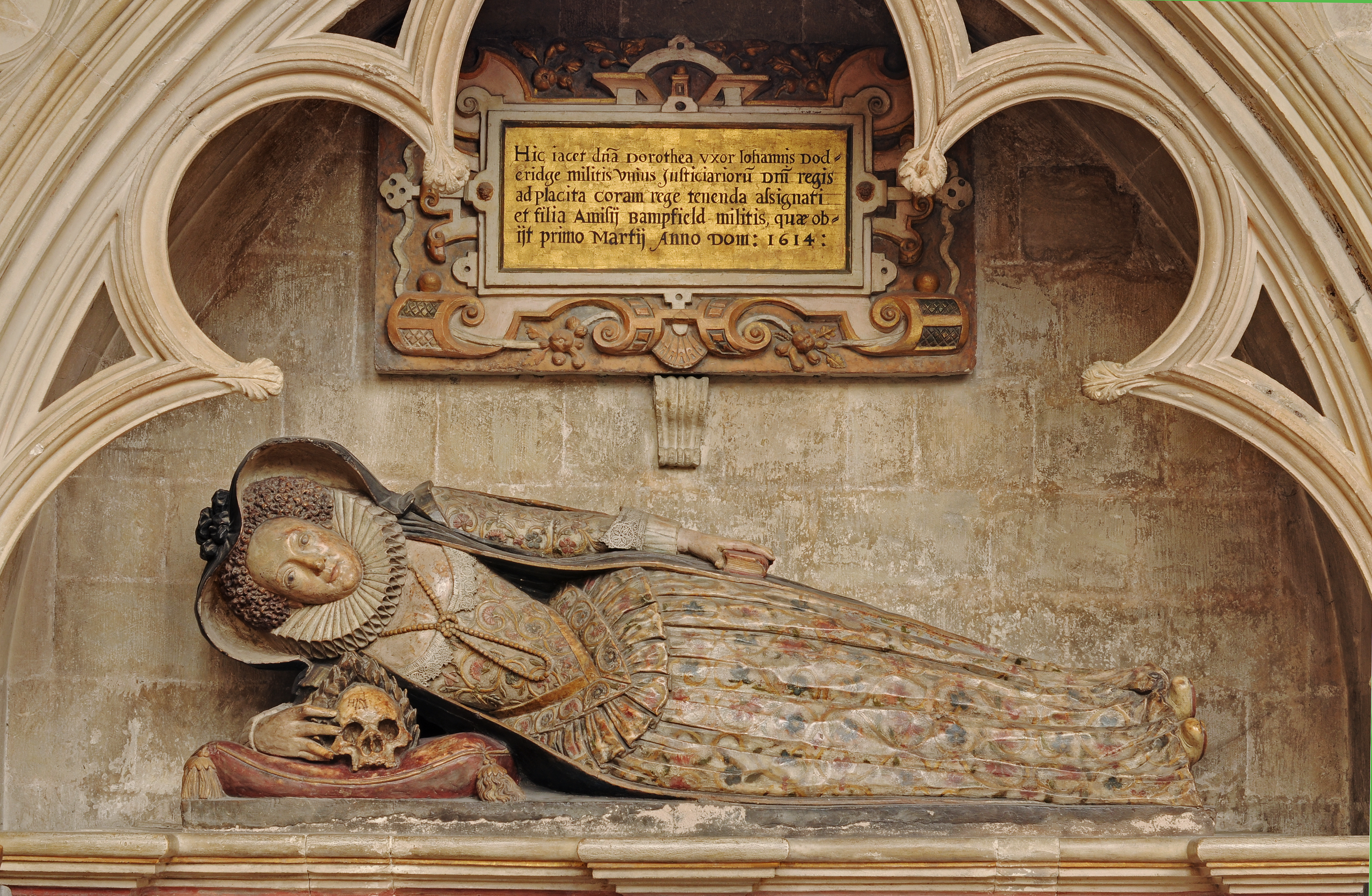
Effigy of Dorothy Bampfield, daughter of Sir Amyas Bampfield, Lady Chapel of Exeter Cathedral

A monument survives in the Lady Chapel of Exeter Cathedral to his daughter Dorothy Bampfield (died 1614), wife successively of Edward Hancock (died 1603), MP, lord of the manor of Combe Martin, Devon, and later wife of Sir John Doddridge (1555–1628), of Bremridge, near North Molton, Justice of the King's Bench, whose effigy is situated adjacent. The Latin inscription on a tablet within a strapwork surround is as follows:

"Hic jacet d(omi)na Dorothea uxor Johannis Dioderidge militis unius justiciarioru(m) d(omi)ni regis as placita coram rege tenenda assignati et filia Amisii Bampfield militis quae obiit primo Martii Anno Dom(ini) 1614" ("Here lies Dorothy the wife of John Doderidge, knight, one of the Justices of the Lord King assigned at the Pleas held before the King, and daughter of Amisus (Latinised form) Bampfield, knight, who died on the first of March in the Year of Our Lord 1614").

== Death and burial ==
Bampfield died at Cottonheath on 9 February 1625 at the age of 65 and stated in his will his wish to be "buried in North Molton church with his parents". It might seem however that his parents were buried in Poltimore Church, where a grand monument with their effigies survives, erected by Amias in 1604, with Latin inscription above: Hic tremibunda boni requiescunt membra Rich(ard)i Bampfildi... ("Here rest the trembling limbs of the worthy Richard Bampfield..."). A grand monument to Amias with effigy survives in the Bampfield Chapel of North Molton Church.

== Monument at North Molton ==
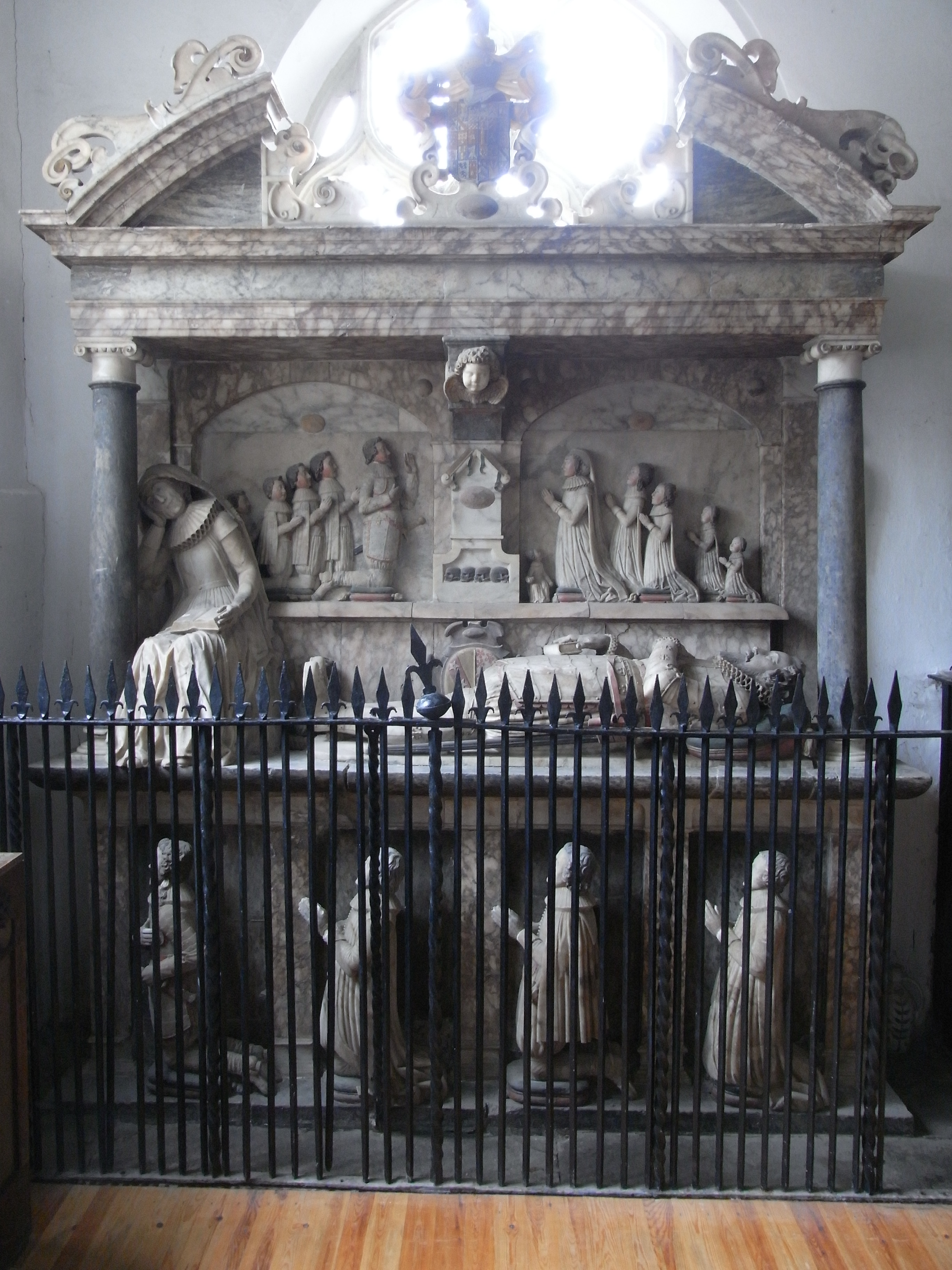
Monument to Sir Amyas Bampfylde, All Saints' Church, North Molton, south wall of south aisle chapel ("Bampfylde Chapel")

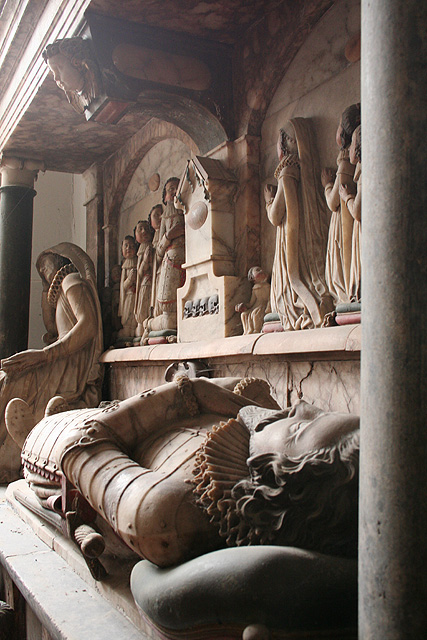
Monument with recumbent effigy of Sir Amyas Bampfylde, All Saints' Church, North Molton. His wife Elizabeth Clifton is shown seated at his feet, in an attitude of mourning

A fine stone monument to his memory exists against the south wall of the south aisle chapel ("Bampfylde Chapel") in North Molton Church. On the wall to its right is affixed a stone tablet inscribed with the following lines:

"Stand passenger gaze such was he
As thou tremble such shalt thou be
He dy'd to live so live to dye
Depart muse on eternity"

Ameae Bamfylde equiti aurato patri suo charissimo ex antiqua Bamfydeorum (sic) de Poltimore familia patre Richardo Bamfyde (sic) armigero matre Elizabetha Clifton de Barrington per 45 annos conjugato ex qua 12 filios 5 filias suscepit prudenti sed pio animoso sed affabili provido sed hospitali et benigno de suis de patria bene merito ex hac miseriarum valle anno aetatis suae 67 ad immortalitatem commigranti et sui reliquias his in terris quas post diuturna litigia et graves expensas sui posteritati foeliciter recuperavit in spem resurrectionis requiescere volenti Johannes Bamfylde filius et haeres qui etiam ex Elizabeth Drake de Buckland 8 filios et 7 filias ante patris obitum habuit anno Christi 1626 regis Caroli 2 hoc monumentum pietatis ergo posuit quas terras mea cura meis non-parva redemit hae mea jure sinu molliter ossa fovent.

Translated literally into English thus:

"To Amyas Bampfylde, knight bachelor, most dear to his father, from the ancient family of the Bampfyldes of Poltimore from Richard Bampfylde, esquire, his father, from Elizabeth Sydenham of Brympton his mother; with Elizabeth Clifton of Barrington having been married during 45 years from whom he received 12 sons, 5 daughters. Prudent but with a pious spirit but easily spoken to; forward-looking but hospitable and benign, well-merited from his country. From this vale of miseries he migrated towards immortality in the 67th year of his age and having wished the remains of him to rest in hope of resurrection in these lands which after long-lasting dispute and heavy expenses happily he regained for his posterity. John Bampfylde his son and heir, who also from Elizabeth Drake of Buckland had before the decease of his father 8 sons and 7 daughters, in the year of Christ 1626, 2nd. of King Charles, therefore of piety placed this monument that these bones might gently warm the lands he redeemed not with small care".

=== Heraldic quarterings ===
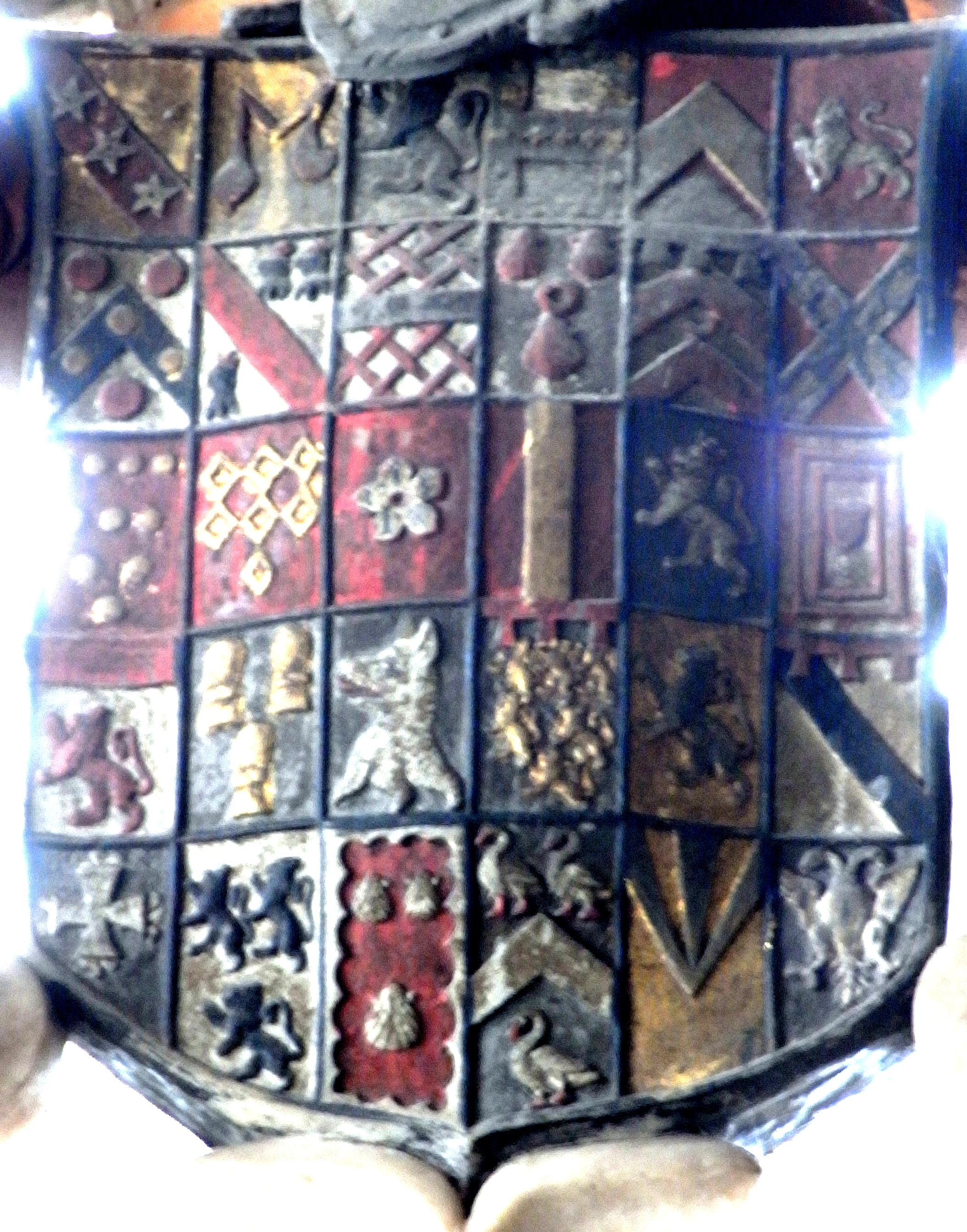
Escutcheon with 30 quarterings above monument to Sir Amyas Bampfylde, North Molton Church

An escutcheon with 30 quarterings survives above the monument to Sir Amyas Bampfylde in North Molton Church, as follows:

- 1: Or, on a bend gules three mullets argent (Bampfield)
- 2: Or, a maunch gules (Hastings)
- 3: Argent, a lion rampant sable (Huxham)
- 4: Argent, on a fess sable three cross crosslets or a bordure azure charged with twelve bezants (Faber)
- 5: Gules, on a chevron or three eagles displayed sable (Cobham)
- 6: Gules, a lion passant argent holding in the front paws a baton(?)
- 7: Argent, on a chevron sable between three torteaux three bezants (Bolhay)
- 8: Argent, a bend gules between three lion's heads erased and ducally crowned sable (Pederton)
- 9: Argent fretty gules, over all a fess azure (Cann)
- 10: Argent, an annulet between three escallops gules (Tourney)
- 11: Argent, two chevrons gules a label of three points vert (St Maur)
- 12: Gules, a saltire vairy (Willington)
- 13: Gules, ten bezants, four, three, two and one (Zouch)
- 14: Gules, seven mascles or, three, three and one (de Quincy)
- 15: Gules, a cinquefoil pierced ermine (Leicester)
- 16: Gules, a pale or (Grandmeisnil)
- 17: Sable, a lion rampant between eight cinquefoils argent (Clifton)
- 18: Argent, a human heart within a double tressure flory counter-flory gules (David, Prince of Scotland)
- 19: Argent, a lion rampant gules a chief of the last (?)
- 20: Azure, three garbs argent (Peverell)
- 21: Azure, a wolf's head erased argent (Lupus, Earl of Chester)
- 22: Azure, six lions rampant or (Longespee)
- 23: Or crusilly....., a lion rampant azure (Lovell)
- 24: Argent, a bend sable a label of three points gules (St Lo)
- 25: Azure, a cross flory argent (Paveley)
- 26: Argent, three lions rampant sable (Cheverell)
- 27: Gules, three escallops within a bordure engrailed argent (de Erleigh)
- 28: Azure, a chevron between three swans argent (Charlton)
- 29: Or, three piles azure (Brian)
- 30: Azure, an eagle with two heads displayed argent charged with a coronet or (Leofric, Earl of Mercia)

Parliament of England
Preceded by Thomas Dennys; Sir Edward Seymour, 1st Baronet	Member of Parliament for Devon; 1597; With: William Strode	Succeeded by William Courtenay; Sir Edward Seymour, 1st Baronet
