= Edward Giles =

English politician (1566–1637)

Sir Edward Giles
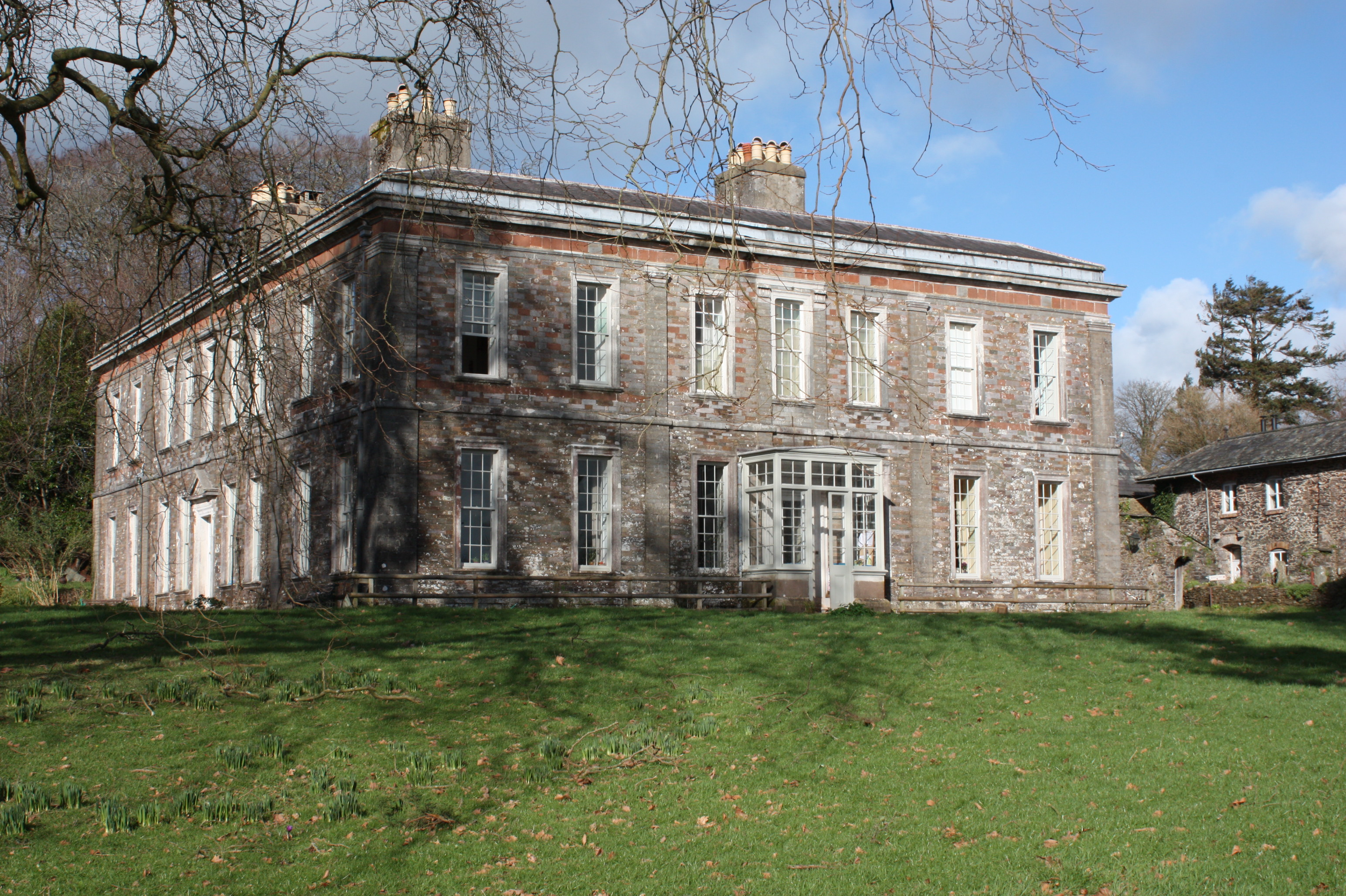
- Bowden House, Ashprington, Devon
- Born: 1566
- Died: 1637 (aged 70–71)
- Resting place: St George's Church, Dean Prior
- Occupation: Member of Parliament
- Spouse: Mary Drewe
- Children: Adam Giles
- Parent: John Giles

Sir Edward Giles (1566–1637) of Bowden House, Ashprington, near Totnes, Devon, was an English politician who sat in the House of Commons at various times between 1597 and 1629.

== Origins ==
Giles was the son John Giles of Bowden, Member of Parliament for Totnes, and was baptised at Totnes on 21 July 1566. Edward's great-grandfather, John Giles, was also MP for Totnes. His Great-Grandfather was one of the richest merchants in Devon and owned properties in and around Totnes, Dean Prior, Bowden and Ashprington.

== Career ==
He matriculated at Exeter College, Oxford on 1 February 1583, aged 17. He was a student of the Middle Temple in 1584. In 1597 he was elected Member of Parliament for Totnes. He was knighted on 23 July 1603 and appointed High Sheriff of Devon for 1612–13. In 1614 he was elected MP for Devon. He was elected MP for Totnes again in 1621 and was re-elected in 1624 and 1625. In 1628 he was elected MP for Totnes again and sat until 1629 when King Charles I decided to rule without Parliament for eleven years.

== Marriage and children ==
On 28 January 1587 at Newton St Cyres, near Crediton, Devon, Giles married Mary Drewe daughter and heiress of Edmond Drewe of Hayne, Newton St Cyres, Devon, and widow of Walter Northcote (1566–1587), younger brother of John Northcote (1570–1632) of Uton and Hayne, Newton St Cyres, the latter who was ancestor of the Northcote Baronets and the Earls of Iddesleigh. By his wife he had no issue.

== Death and burial ==
Giles died at the age of 71 and was buried in St George's Church, Dean Prior, where survives his monument erected in 1642.

Parliament of England
Preceded by Richard Sparry; Christopher Savery	Member of Parliament for Totnes; 1597; With: Christopher Buggin	Succeeded by Leonard Darre; Philip Holditch
Preceded by Sir Edward Seymour, 1st Baronet; Sir John Acland	Member of Parliament for Devon; 1614; With: John Drake	Succeeded by John Drake; Sir Edward Seymour, 2nd Baronet
Preceded by Nathaniel Rich; Lawrence Adams	Member of Parliament for Totnes; 1621–1624; With: Richard Rood 1621–1622; Arthur Champernowne 1624; Sir Edward Seymour, 2nd Baronet	Succeeded by Arthur Champernowne; Philip Holditch
Preceded by Arthur Champernowne; Philip Holditch	Member of Parliament for Totnes; 1628–1629; With: Thomas Prestwood	Parliament suspended until 1640
