= John Doddridge =

British lawyer and politician

John Dodderidge
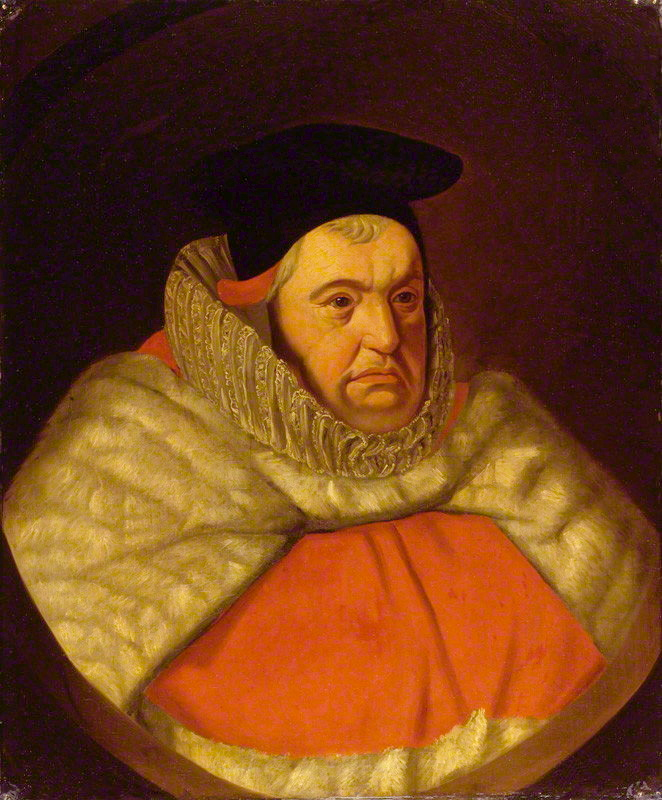
- Sir John Doddridge (1555–1628), Justice of the King's Bench, wearing his judicial robes. National Portrait Gallery.

Member of Parliament for Horsham
- In office 1603-1611

Member of Parliament for Barnstaple
- In office 1588-?

Personal details
- Born: 1555
- Died: 13 September 1628 (aged 72–73) Egham, Surrey, England
- Spouse(s): Joan Jermyn; Dorothy Bampfield; Anne Culme
- Relatives: Pentecost Dodderidge (brother)
- Education: Exeter College, Oxford

Sir John Doddridge (akas: Doderidge or Dodderidge; 1555–1628) was an English lawyer, appointed Justice of the King's Bench in 1612 and served as Member of Parliament for Barnstaple in 1589 and for Horsham in 1604. He was also an antiquarian and writer. He acquired the nickname "the sleeping judge" from his habit of shutting his eyes while listening intently to a case. As a lawyer he was influenced by humanist ideas, and was familiar with the ideas of Aristotle, and the debates of the period between his followers and the Ramists. He was a believer in both the rationality of the English common law and in its connection with custom. He was one of the Worthies of Devon of the biographer John Prince (d.1723).

== Origins ==
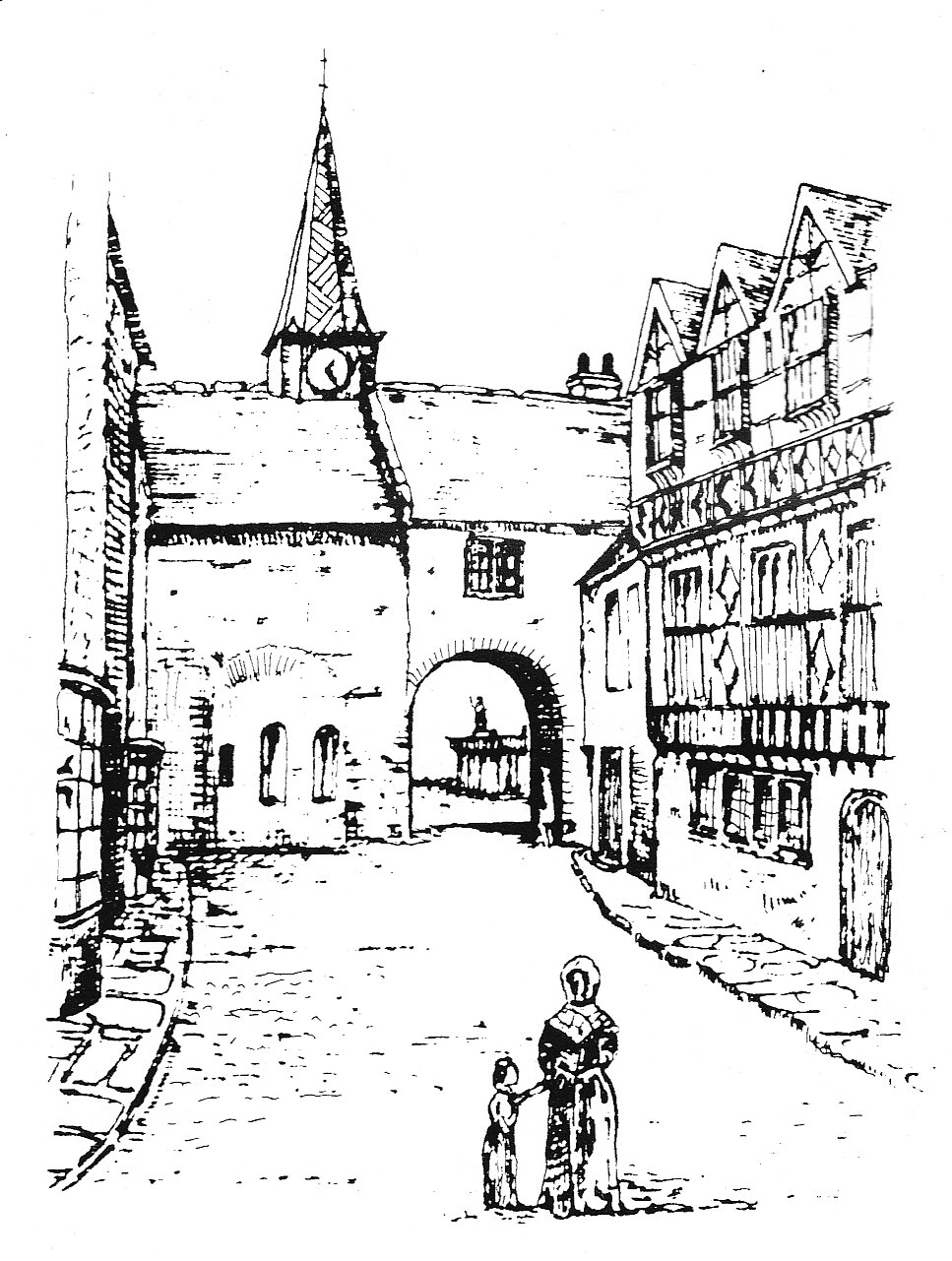
The 16th-century "Doddridge House" (right) in Cross Street, Barnstaple. 19th-century engraving by Jonathan Lomas, looking down Cross Street toward the West Gate.

His father was Richard Doddridge, merchant, of Barnstaple. The family took its name from a manor in the parish of Sandford, near Crediton. Richard was the son of a wool merchant and was born in South Molton where he married. With his wife and eight children before 1582 he moved to Holland Street, Barnstaple and served as Mayor of Barnstaple in 1589.

Richard Doddridge entered the shipping business and owned a 100-ton prize-ship named Prudence, a privateer which landed several prizes probably taken from Spanish galleons. In 1585 he bought a house in Cross Street from his fellow burgess Thomas Skinner, which descended in turn to his sons Sir John and to the latter's brother Pentecost Dodderidge (died c. 1650), MP and mayor of Barnstaple.

This large timber-framed house, known as the "Doddridge House" was demolished in about 1900 to make way for a post office. A room of ornate carved oak panelling dated 1617 from this house survives in Barnstaple Guildhall, known as the "Doddridge Room" and an ornate overmantel displays the date 1617 between the initials "PD" and "ED", signifying Pentecost and his wife Elizabeth. The room is now used to display the Corporation's silver and the mayor's regalia.

== Education ==
He was educated at Exeter College, Oxford, where he graduated BA on 16 February 1577, and entered his legal training in the Middle Temple about the same time.

== Career ==
In 1588, he was elected Member of Parliament for Barnstaple. He became an early member of the Society of Antiquaries, then recently founded. In 1602 and 1603 he delivered some lectures at New Inn on the law of advowsons. In Lent 1603 he discharged the duties of reader at Middle Temple

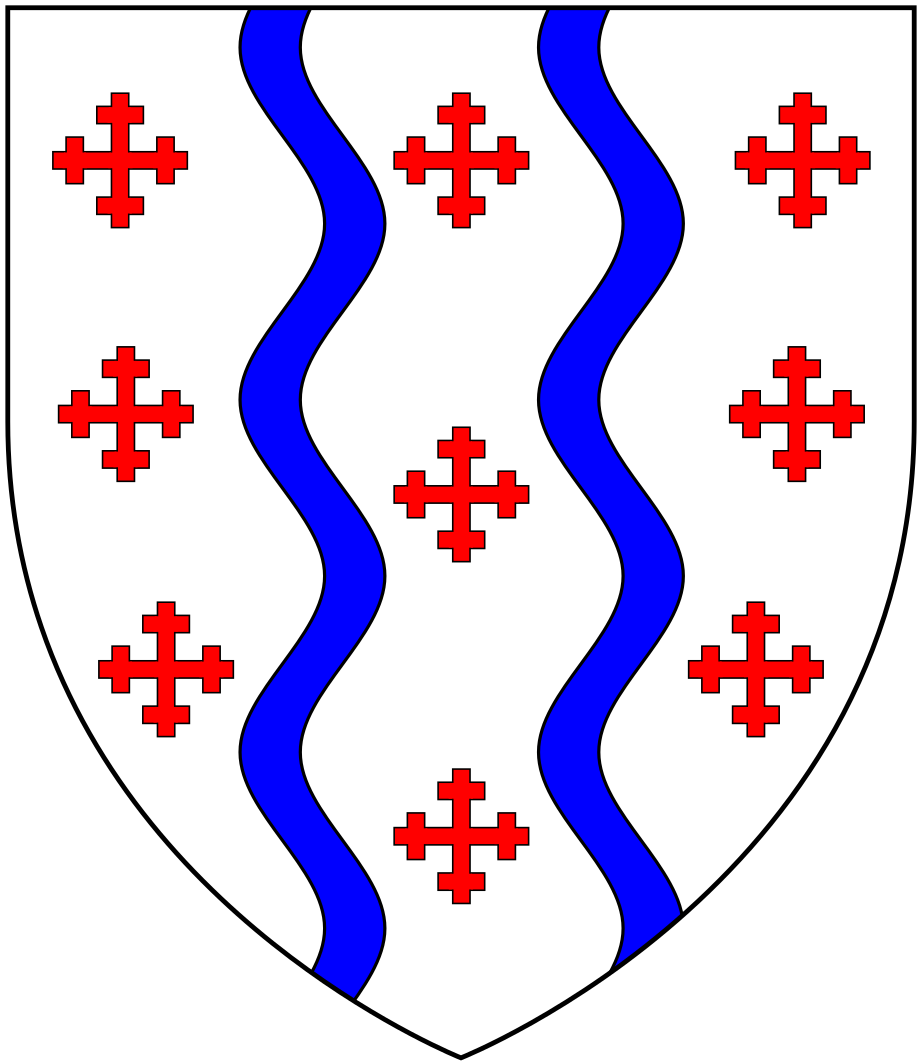
Arms of Dodderidge

On 20 January 1604 he took the degree of serjeant-at-law, and about the same time he was appointed Serjeant to Henry Frederick, Prince of Wales. He was relieved of the status of Serjeant and appointed solicitor-general on 29 October 1604.

Between 1603 and 1611 he sat in parliament as member for Horsham, Sussex. He took part in the conference in the Painted Chamber at Westminster, held 25 February 1606, on the question whether Englishmen and Scotchmen born after the accession of James I to the English throne were naturalised by that event in the other kingdom. Doddridge adopted the common-law view that no such reciprocal naturalisation took place, and the majority in the conference were with him. The question was, however, subsequently decided in the opposite sense by Lord Chancellor Ellesmere and twelve judges in the exchequer chamber (Calvin's Case). Doddridge was knighted on 5 July 1607, and created a Justice of the King's Bench on 25 November 1612. On 4 February 1614 the University of Oxford conferred on him the degree of MA.

Unlike Sir Edward Coke, he showed no reluctance to give extra-judicial opinions; Francis Bacon wrote to the king with reference to Peacham's Case that Doddridge was ready to give an opinion in secret. Nevertheless he signed the letter refusing to stay proceedings at the instance of the king in the Commendam Case (27 April 1616). On being summoned to the king's presence, all the judges except Coke receded from the position they had taken in the letter; Doddridge went further to accommodate the king.

Doddridge sat on the commission appointed in October 1621 to examine the right of Archbishop George Abbot to install the newly elected bishops John Williams, John Davenant, and Valentine Cary who objected to be consecrated by him on account of his accidental homicide in a hunting accident. Directed at the time of interest in the Spanish Match (August 1623) by warrant under the great seal to soften the rigour of the statutes against recusants, Doddridge, according to Yonge, was hoped to discover a way to dispense with the statutes altogether. He concurred in the judgment delivered by Chief-Justice Nicholas Hyde on 28 November 1627 in Darnell's Case, refusing to admit to bail the five knights committed to prison for refusing to subscribe the forced loan of that year, and he was arraigned by the House of Lords in April of the following year to justify his conduct. His plea was that "the king holds of none but God".

== Residences ==
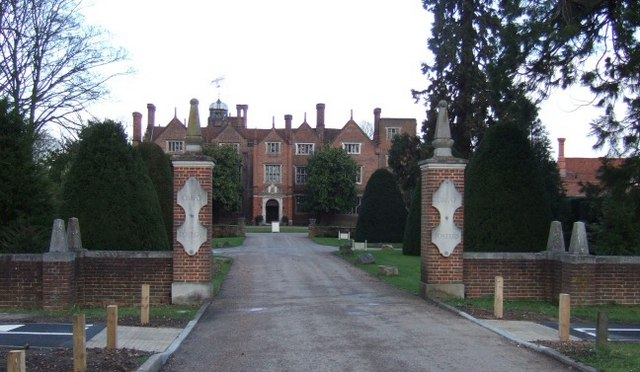
Great Fosters, near Egham, Surrey, Doddridge's seat near London at which he died in 1628, as stated on his epitaph in Exeter Cathedral

The Doddridge family was seated at Dodderidge in the parish of Sandford, near Crediton from the 13th century to 1746. Sir John Doddridge lived at the house inherited from his father in Cross Street, Barnstaple, and on his estate of Bremridge, 8 miles NW of South Molton, a Domesday Book manor which was later held from the feudal barony of Barnstaple. (An ancient estate called Bremridge also exists in Sandford parish.) Sir John rebuilt Bremridge in about 1622, (the date 1654 is inscribed on the entrance arch) and much of his building survived the demolition of the left wing in circa 1830. He acquired a lease from Sir George Speke (d. 1637; of Whitelackington, Somerset) of the estate of Heywood in the parish of Wembworthy, Devon, the most ancient English seat of that family acquired soon after the Norman Conquest of 1066. His Exeter town house was Mount Radford, in the parish of St Leonards, owned by the Hancock family and used by his wife Dorothy Bampfield as her dower house.

== Marriages ==
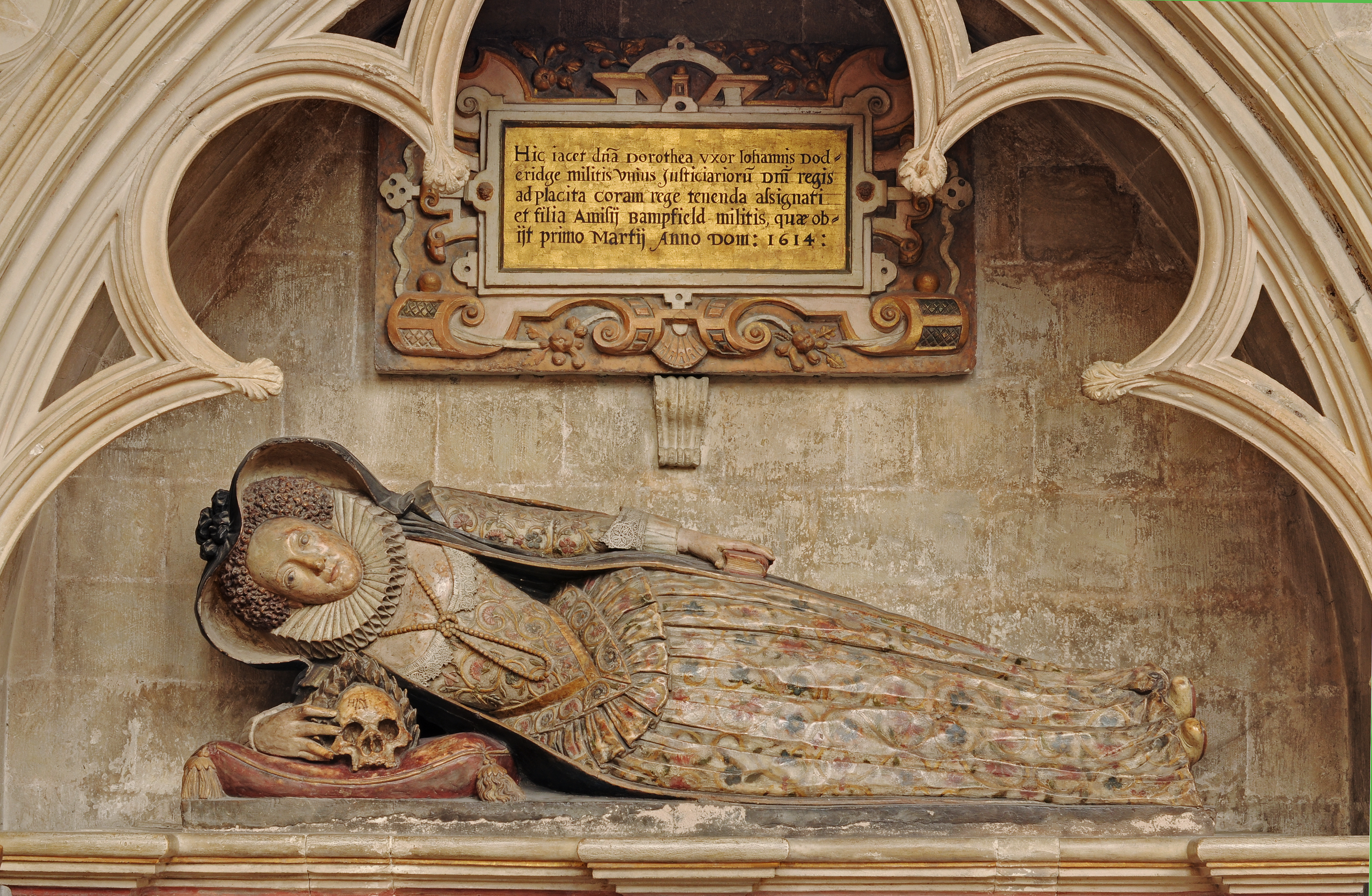
Effigy of Dorothy Bampfield, Dodderidge's second wife, Exeter Cathedral

He married three times but left no issue:

- Firstly to Joan Jermyn, daughter of Michael Jermyn, twice mayor of Exeter, without issue.
- Secondly to Dorothy Bampfield, daughter of Sir Amias Bampfield (1560–1626), MP. There is a monument to her in the Lady Chapel of Exeter Cathedral.
- Thirdly to Anne Culme, as her second husband, daughter of Nicholas Culme, a younger son of Hugh Culme (died 1545), of Molland-Champson, Devon.

== Death and burial ==
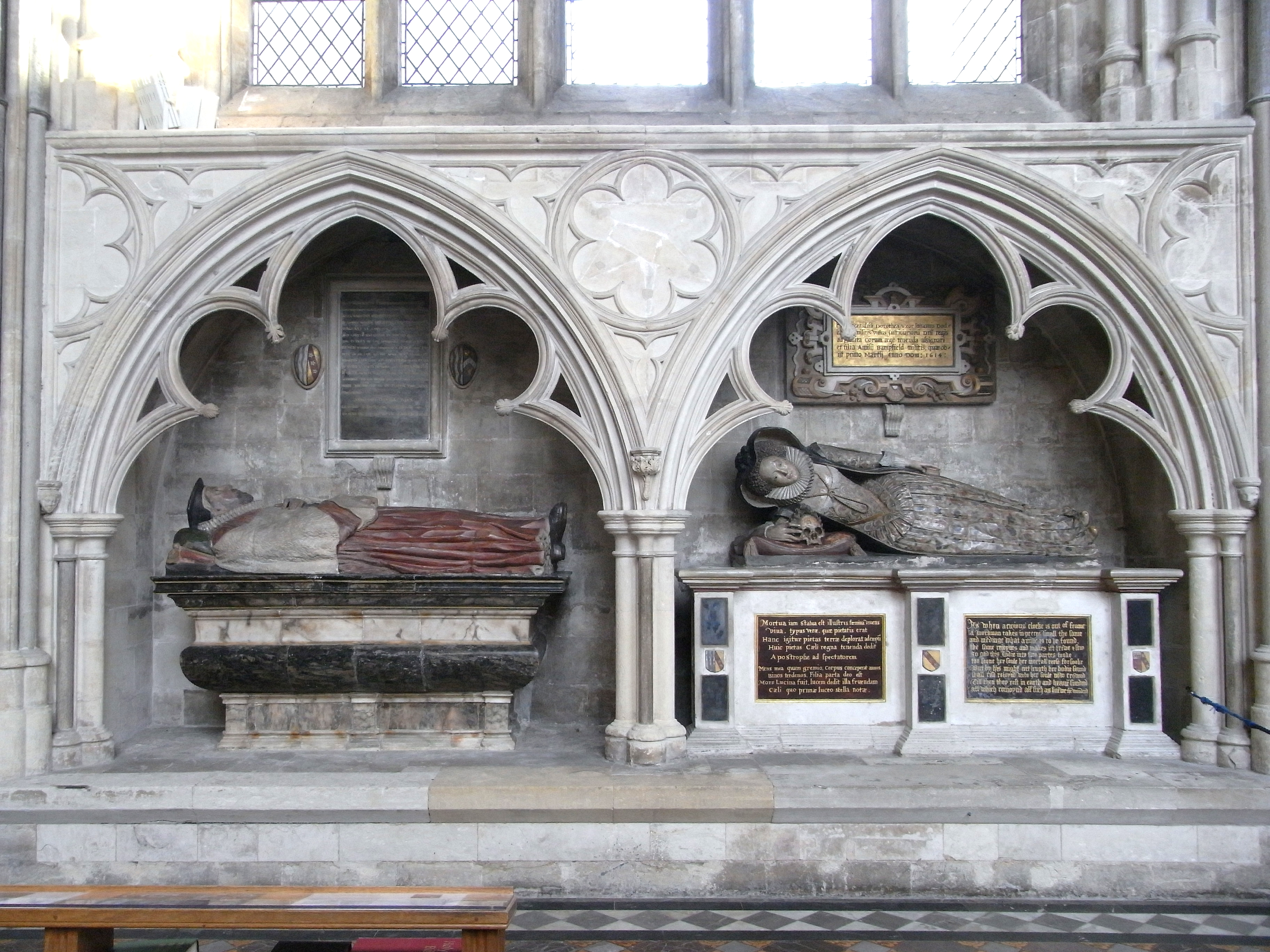
Monuments to Sir John and his second wife, Dorothy. Lady Chapel, Exeter Cathedral.

Doddridge died on 13 September 1628, at his house Great Fosters, near Egham, and was buried in the Lady Chapel of Exeter Cathedral, with twin monuments against the north wall containing effigies to himself and his second wife. His monument consists of his recumbent effigy sculpted in alabaster, resting on a chest-tomb, showing him dressed in scarlet robes with a court roll in his hand, all within a niche under a Gothic arch. His armorials are displayed on the wall within two cartouches on either side of his effigy impaled with the arms of his two last wives. Next to this on the east side is an effigy of his second wife Dorothy Bampfield (d.1617), under an adjoining matching Gothic arch. An epitaph and two chronograms are inscribed on a stone tablet above his effigy.

== Heir ==
His heir was his brother Pentecost Dodderidge (died c. 1650), MP, whose own heir was his son John Dodderidge (died 1659).

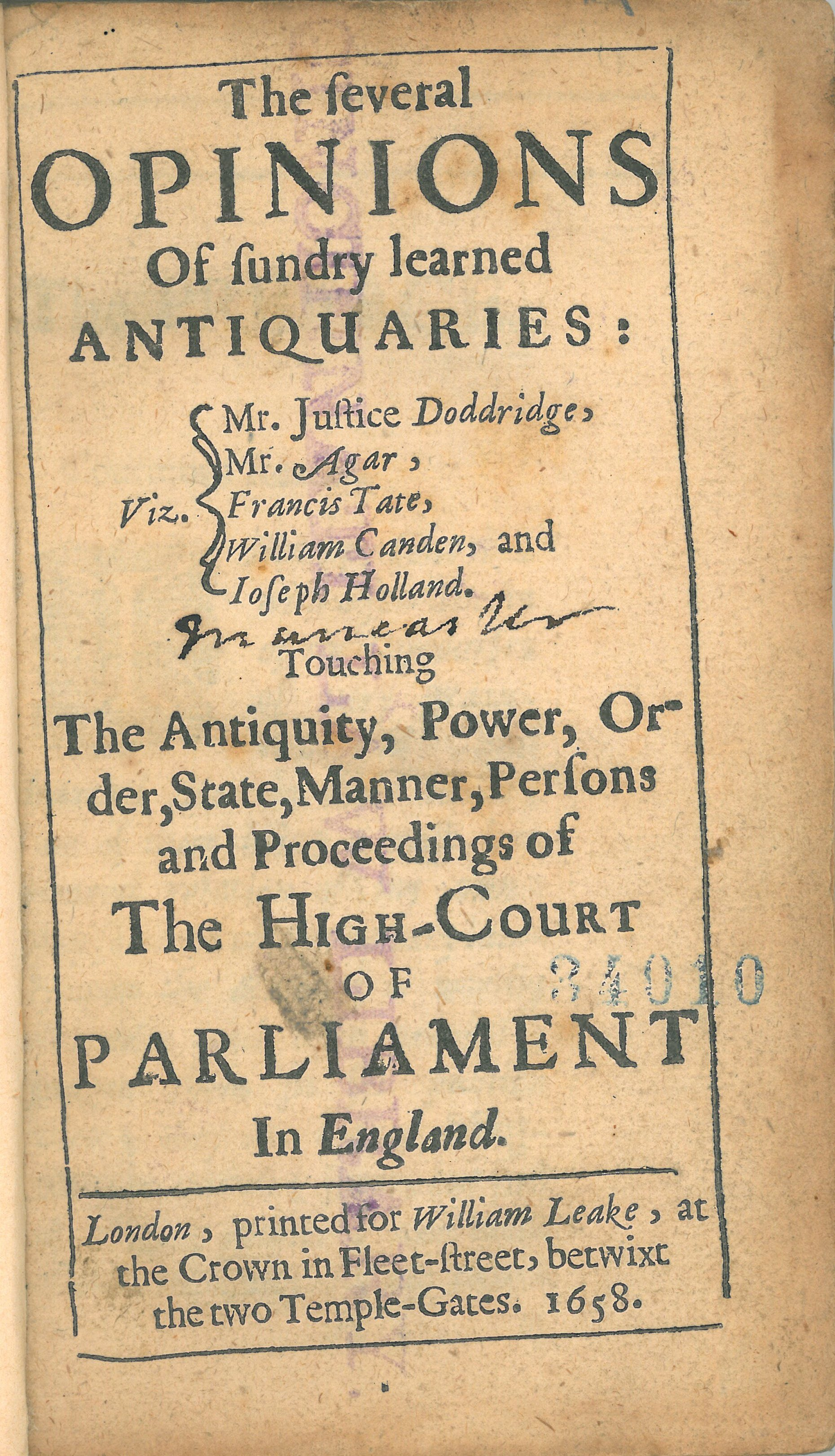
The title page of The Several Opinions of Sundry Learned Antiquaries (1658) published by Doddridge's nephew John Dodderidge containing an essay said to be by Doddridge

== Works ==
Doddridge is the author of the following works published posthumously:

- The Lawyer's Light (a manual for students), London, 1629.
- History of Wales, Cornwall, and Chester (chiefly from records at the Tower), London, 1630.
- A Compleat Parson (based on his lectures on advowsons), London, 1630; 2nd ed. 1641.
- The English Lawyer (including a reprint of the Lawyer's Light and a treatise for practitioners and judges), London, 1631.
- Law of Nobility and Peerage, London, 1658.

Thomas Hearne's Curious Discourses contain two brief tracts by Doddridge: Of the Dimensions of the Land of England, and A Consideration of the Office and Duty of the Heralds in England. A Dissertation on Parliament was published as the work of Doddridge by his nephew John Dodderidge of the Middle Temple in a volume entitled Opinions of Sundry Learned Antiquaries ... Touching the Antiquity, Power, Order, State, Manner, Persons and Proceedings of the High-Court of Parliament in England (London, 1658; reprinted in 1679). It is of doubtful authenticity. The original edition of the work on deeds known as Sheppard's Touchstone of Common Assurances, and the work on the Office of Executor, assigned by Anthony Wood to Thomas Wentworth, both of which were published anonymously in 1641, have been ascribed to Doddridge. A small treatise on the royal prerogative (Harl. MS. 5220) also purports to be his work.

== Sources ==
- Rigg, J.M. (1888). "Doddridge, John" . Dictionary of National Biography. Vol. 15. pp. 382–383.
- Prince, John, The Worthies of Devon, 1810 edition, pp. 301–306, biography of Sir John Dodderidge
- Fuidge, N.M., biography of John Dodderidge, published in History of Parliament: House of Commons 1558–1603, ed. P.W. Hasler, 1981
- Lamplugh, Lois, Barnstaple: Town on the Taw, Chichester, 2002
