= Alexander Nowell =

Anglican priest and theologian (c. 1517 – 1602)

The Very Reverend Alexander Nowell
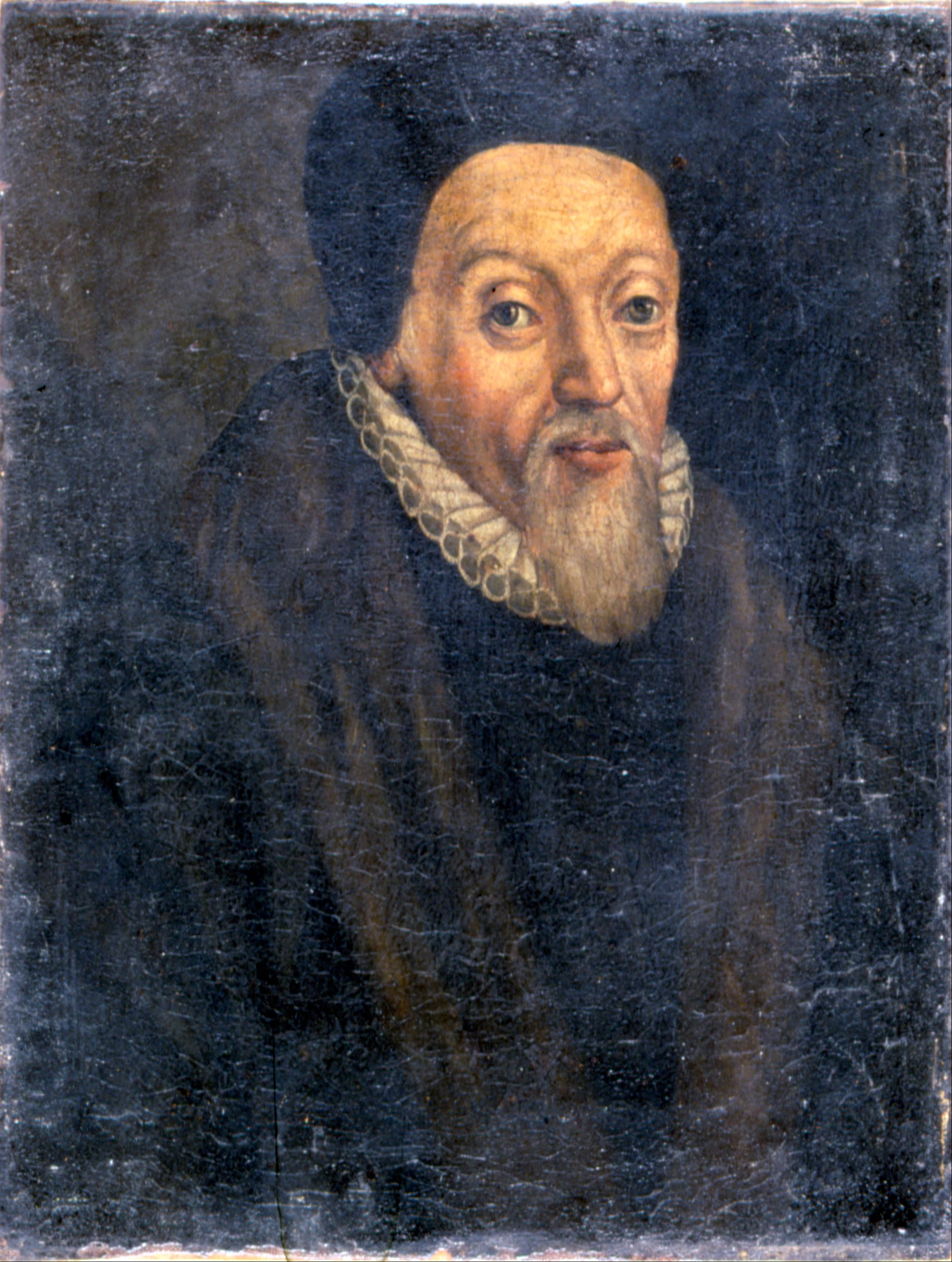
- Alexander Nowell

Member of Parliament for West Looe
- In office September 1553 – October 1553 Serving with Ralph Clive
- Monarch: Mary I
- Preceded by: John Astley
- Succeeded by: William Bendlowes

Personal details
- Born: 1517 Read, Lancashire
- Died: February 13, 1602 London, Middlesex
- Spouses: (1) Jane Mery; (2) Elizabeth Hast
- Relations: William Whitaker (nephew)
- Parents: John Nowell; Elizabeth Kay
- Education: Brasenose College, Oxford: (BA; MA; DD)
- Occupation: Clergyman; Theologian

Ecclesiastical career
- Religion: Christianity (Anglican)
- Church: Church of England
- Offices held: Prebendary of Westminster Abbey (1551–4, 1560–4); Archdeacon of Middlesex (1560); Dean of St Paul's (1560–1602); Rector of Saltwood, Kent (1560); Rector of Much Hadham, Hertfordshire (1562–89)

Alexander Nowell (c. 1517 – 13 February 1602), also known as Alexander Noel, was an Anglican priest and theologian who served as Dean of St Paul's during much of Elizabeth I's reign, and is now remembered for his catechisms, written in Latin.

== Early life ==
Alexander Nowell was the eldest son of John Nowell of Read Hall, Read, Lancashire, by his second wife Elizabeth Kay of Rochdale, and was the brother of Laurence Nowell, who became Dean of Lichfield. His sister Beatrice was the mother of John Hammond; Another brother, Robert Nowell, became Attorney of the Court of Wards.

Nowell was educated at Middleton, near Rochdale, Lancashire and at Brasenose College, Oxford where he is said to have shared rooms with John Foxe the martyrologist. He was awarded his B.A. in 1536, M.A. in 1540, later a D.D. in 1578 and was elected fellow of Brasenose in 1526, spending some 13 years in Oxford.

== In London ==
In 1543 Nowell was appointed master of Westminster School, and, in December 1551, prebendary of Westminster Abbey. During this period he became involved in a controversy with Thomas Dorman, over the views of the late John Redman, which ran on in different forms for many years.

Nowell was elected in September 1553 as Member of Parliament for West Looe in Cornwall in Queen Mary's first parliament. In October of that year, however, a committee of the house reported that he could not sit in the House of Commons because as prebendary of Westminster he had a seat in Convocation. He was then also deprived of his prebendary, in 1554.

== Marian exile ==
Nowell was one of the Marian exiles, Protestants who left England during the Reign of Mary I and Philip II. He left England in 1555, aided by the merchant Francis Bowyer. He went first to Strassburg and then to Frankfurt, where he became involved in the doctrinal and liturgical dispute between the exiles. While trying to moderate the discussions, Nowell came to side with John Knox.

== Dean of St Paul's ==
Nowell returned to England when Elizabeth I came to the throne, becoming chaplain to Edmund Grindal in December 1560. He was given the archdeaconry of Middlesex at the start of 1561, a canonry at Canterbury, and in November 1561 became Dean of St Paul's. In 1562, Edmund Grindal, Bishop of London collated him with the Parish of Great or Much Hadham in Hertfordshire, near the Bishop's residence, Much Hadham Palace.

In the Convocation of 1563 Nowell played a prominent part. On its opening day, 12 January, he preached in Westminster Abbey the sermon for the opening of the concurrent Parliament. In it, he gave offence to the Queen, when he called on her to marry. It was said that she never spoke a friendly word to him again. On the following day, Matthew Parker nominated him as prolocutor of the Lower House of Convocation. Elected to the post, he was used to keeping the two Houses, the Upper consisting of bishops, in touch with each other.

Friction with the Queen is well attested. On one occasion she rebuked Nowell in the vestry for having given her a prayer book with pictures of saints and angels that smacked of the Church of Rome. On another, in March 1565, she interrupted his sermon, directed against a work A Treatyse of the Crosse (1564) of John Martiall, telling him to stick to his text and cease slighting the crucifix. In 1594 he was appointed Canon of the eleventh stall at St George's Chapel, Windsor Castle, a position he held until 1602.

== Death and legacy ==
Nowell held the deanery of St Paul's for 42 years, until his death on 13 February 1602; and was buried within his cathedral. With his brother Robert, a lawyer, he re-established the free school at Middleton; and made other benefactions for educational purposes at Brasenose College.

Sometime after his death, he was credited by Thomas Fuller (and his later revisers), with the accidental invention of bottled beer. "Without offence it may be remembered, that leaving a bottle of ale, when fishing, in the grass, he found it some days after, no bottle, but a gun, such the sound at the opening thereof : and this is believed (casualty is mother of more inventions than industry) the original of bottled ale in England."

He was also a keen angler, and Izaak Walton says, "this good man was observed to spend a tenth part of his time in angling; and also (for I have conversed with those which have conversed with him) to bestow a tenth part of his revenue, and usually all his fish, amongst the poor that inhabited near to those rivers in which it was caught; saying often, 'that charity gave life to religion'".

He is a character in the drama 'If You Know Not Me, You Know Nobody' by Thomas Heywood, where he plays the role of a conciliator in a land dispute between Sir Thomas Gresham and Sir Thomas Ramsey.

== Works ==
Nowell is now remembered for his work on catechisms. His Latin Catechismus puerorum, in manuscript, gained the support of the Lower House in the Convocation of 1563. It was printed in 1570, as Catechismus, sive, Prima institutio disciplinaque pietatis Christianae, with Matthew Parker's approval. It was officially required to be used in schools, in 1571, and Thomas Norton translated it into English, as A Catechism, or, First instruction of Christian religion (1570). Abridged versions appeared: the "middle" catechism (1572) and the "shorter" catechism (1573). A Welsh translation, Catecism eglwys loegr by Thomas Jones of Denbigh, appeared in 1809.

== Family ==
Nowell was twice married, but left no children; his first wife was Jane Mery, widow of Thomas Bowyer, the uncle of Francis Bowyer, and his second Elizabeth Hast, twice widow. He was also the uncle of the theologian William Whitaker, who translated the "middle" catechism into Greek.

== Notes ==
Church of England titles
Preceded by William May	Dean of St Paul's Cathedral, London; 1560–1602	Succeeded by John Overall
Preceded by William Chedsey	Archdeacon of Middlesex; 1560	Succeeded by Thomas Watts
Parliament of England
Preceded by John Astley (courtier); William Morice (died 1554)	Member of Parliament for West Looe; 1553–1553; With: Ralph Clive	Succeeded by William Bendlowes; Robert Monson
Academic offices
Preceded by Richard Harris	Principal of Brasenose College, Oxford; 1595–1596	Succeeded by Thomas Singleton
Preceded by John Adams	Master of Westminster School; 1543–1555	Succeeded by Nicholas Udall
