= Ralph Clive =

(c.1520-82) of Walford, Salop

Ralph Clive (c. 1520 in Walford, Shropshire – 1582) was a former MP in Cornwall, representing West Looe constituency. He was elected in the October 1553 English general election but did not return to Parliament after the election the next year.

Parliament of the United Kingdom
Preceded by John Astley; William Morice	Member of Parliament for West Looe; October – December 1553	Succeeded by William Bendlowes; Robert Monson
