= Edward Seymour, 9th Duke of Somerset =

English peer and landowenr

His Grace The Duke of Somerset PC
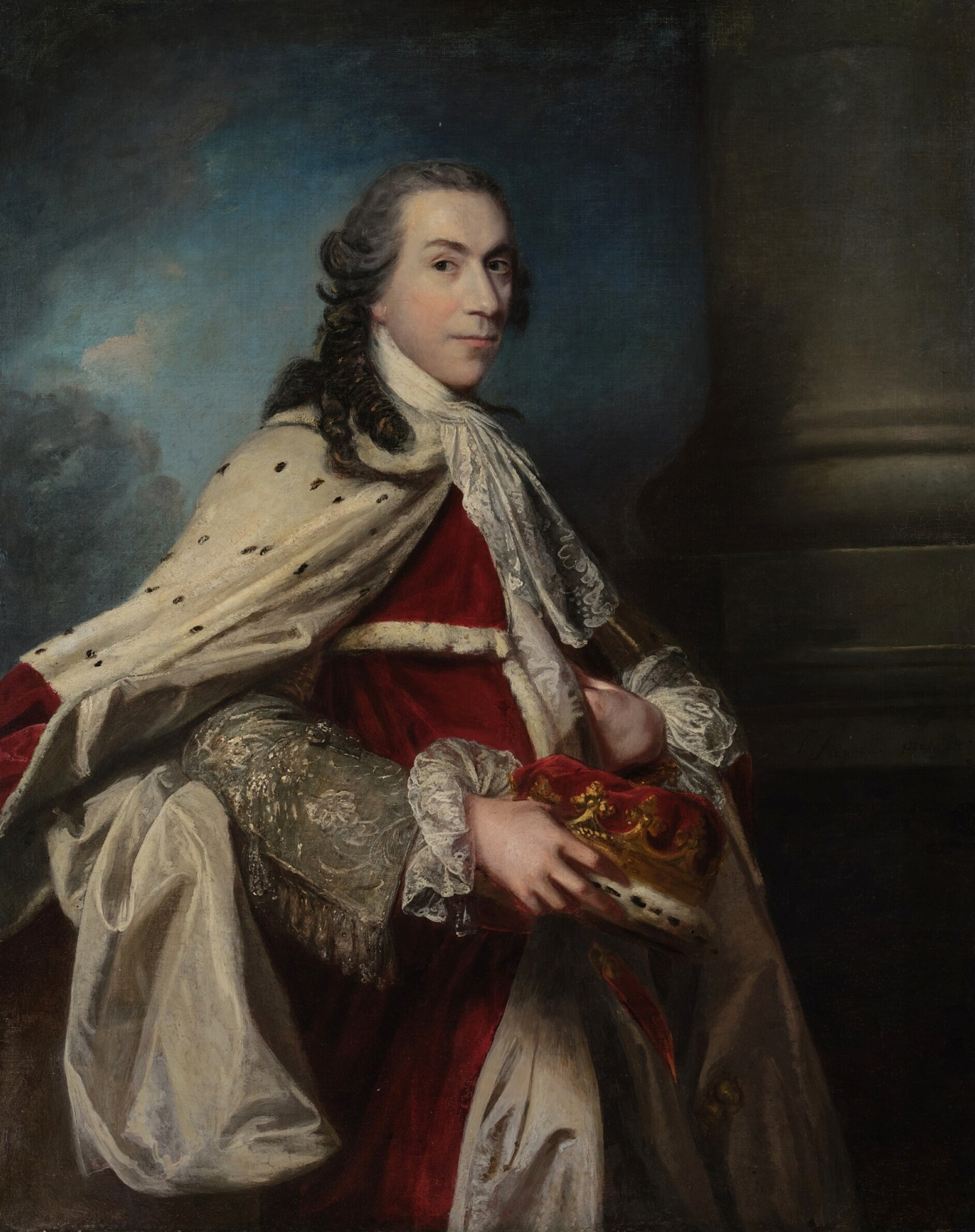
- Portrait by Sir Joshua Reynolds
- Born: 2 January 1717
- Died: 2 January 1792 (aged 75)
- Successor: Webb Seymour
- Parent(s): Edward Seymour; Mary Webb

Edward Seymour, 9th Duke of Somerset PC (2 January 1717 – 2 January 1792) was an English peer and landowner.

== Early life ==
Seymour was baptized on 27 January 1717 at Easton in Wiltshire. He was the eldest son of Edward Seymour, 8th Duke of Somerset, and his wife, the former Mary Webb. He had four younger brothers and a sister, Webb Seymour, 10th Duke of Somerset, Lord William Seymour, the Very Rev. Lord Francis Seymour (Dean of Wells Cathedral), and Lady Mary Seymour (wife of Vincent John Biscoe, of Hookwood).

== Career ==
He succeeded his father as Duke of Somerset in the Peerage of England on 12 December 1757, at the same time inheriting the Seymour baronetcy of Berry Pomeroy, which his father had inherited from his father, Sir Edward Seymour, 5th Baronet, in 1740. While his father had succeeded his distant cousin as the 8th Duke of Somerset in 1750, he inherited little of the great wealth enjoyed by his two predecessors, as the 7th Duke had arranged for the principal Percy family estates and houses of Alnwick Castle, Northumberland House, Petworth House, and Syon House to be divided between his daughter, Elizabeth, and his nephew, Charles Wyndham.

He was named a Privy Councillor by George II and in 1783 was awarded an annual pension, which along with his financial management and reclusiveness contributed to the growth of his fortune.

== Personal life ==
He died on his 75th birthday, unmarried and childless, and was interred on 11 January 1792 at Maiden Bradley, near Warminster, Wiltshire. His titles passed to his brother Webb Seymour.

== Ancestry ==
Ancestors of Edward Seymour, 9th Duke of Somerset

Sir Edward Seymour, 3rd Baronet
Sir Edward Seymour, 4th Baronet
Anne Portman
Sir Edward Seymour, 5th Baronet
Sir William Wale
Margaret Wale
Edward Seymour, 8th Duke of Somerset
Laetitia Popham
Edward Seymour, 9th Duke of Somerset
Alexander Popham
Sir Francis Popham
Letitia Carre
Daniel Webb
Helena/Eleanor Rogers
Mary Webb
John Somner
Elizabeth Somner

Peerage of England
Preceded by Edward Seymour	Duke of Somerset; 1757–1792	Succeeded by Webb Seymour
