= Charles Buller =

British politician (1806–1848)

The Right Honourable Charles Buller
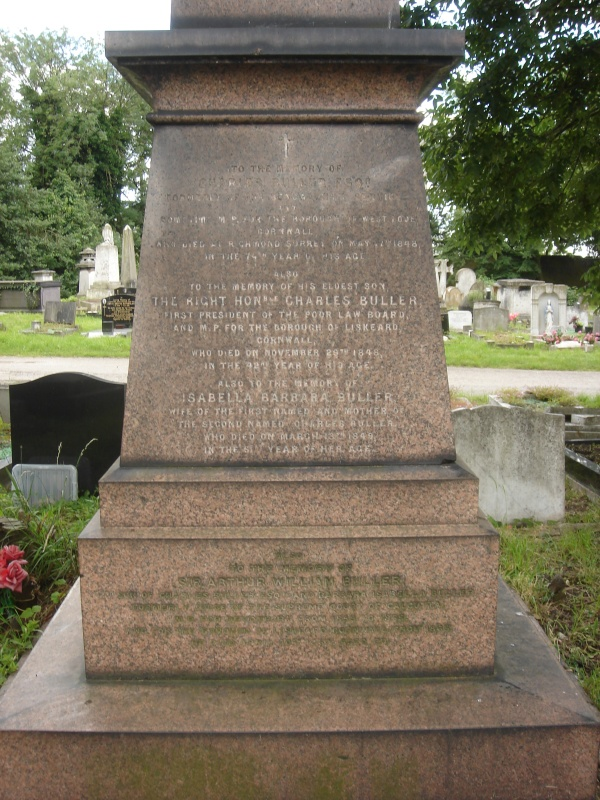
- Funerary monument, Kensal Green Cemetery, London

Judge Advocate General
- In office 8 July 1846 – 1847
- Monarch: Victoria
- Prime Minister: Lord John Russell
- Preceded by: Hon. James Stuart-Wortley
- Succeeded by: William Goodenough Hayter

President of the Poor Law Board
- In office 23 July 1847 – 29 November 1848
- Monarch: Victoria
- Prime Minister: Lord John Russell
- Preceded by: New office
- Succeeded by: Matthew Talbot Baines

Personal details
- Born: 6 August 1806 Calcutta, British India
- Died: 29 November 1848 (aged 42) London, England
- Party: Whig
- Education: Trinity College, Cambridge

Charles Buller (6 August 1806 – 29 November 1848) was a British barrister, politician and reformer.

== Background and education ==
Born in Calcutta, British India, Buller was the son of Charles Buller (1774–1848), a member of a well-known Cornish family, and Barbara Isabella Kirkpatrick, daughter of General William Kirkpatrick, considered an exceptionally talented woman. His younger brother was Sir Arthur William Buller. He was educated at Harrow, then privately in Edinburgh by Thomas Carlyle, and afterwards at Trinity College, Cambridge, gaining his BA in 1828. He had been admitted to Lincoln's Inn in 1824, and became a barrister in 1831.

== Political career ==
Before this date, however, Buller had succeeded his father as Member of Parliament for West Looe. After the passing of the Reform Bill of 1832 and the consequent disenfranchisement of this borough, he was returned to Parliament for Liskeard, a seat he retained until he died.

An eager reformer and a friend of John Stuart Mill, Buller voted for the Great Reform Bill, favoured other progressive measures, and presided over the committee on the state of the records and the one appointed to inquire into the state of election law in Ireland in 1836. In the aftermath of the Rebellions of 1837, he went to Canada in 1838 with Lord Durham as private secretary, and served in the second session of the Special Council of Lower Canada. For a long time, it was believed that Buller wrote Lord Durham's famous Report on the Affairs of British North America. However, this is now denied by several authorities, among them being Durham's biographer, Stuart J Reid, who mentions that Buller described this statement as a groundless assertion in an article which he wrote for the Edinburgh Review. Nevertheless, it is quite possible that the Report was largely drafted by Buller, and it almost certainly bears traces of his influence. He also wrote A Sketch of Lord Durham's mission to Canada, which was never printed. He returned with Durham to England in the same year. Buller and Sir William Molesworth were associated with Edward Gibbon Wakefield and his schemes for colonising South Australia, Canada and New Zealand.

Buller was briefly Secretary to the Board of Control under Lord Melbourne during 1841. After practising as a barrister, he was made Judge Advocate General by Lord John Russell in 1846, and became the first President of the Poor Law Board the following year.

== Personal life ==
Buller died in office in London in November 1848, aged 42. He never married. He was considered a very talented man, witty, popular and generous, and is described by Carlyle as "the genialest radical I have ever met". Among his intimate friends were Grote, Thackeray, Monckton Milnes and Lady Ashburton. A bust of Buller is in Westminster Abbey, and another was unveiled at Liskeard in 1905. He left behind him, so Charles Greville says, a memory cherished for his delightful social qualities and a vast credit for undeveloped powers.

Parliament of the United Kingdom
Preceded by Charles Buller; Sir Charles Hulse, Bt	Member of Parliament for West Looe; 1830–1831; With: Sir Charles Hulse, Bt	Succeeded by Sir Anthony Buller; Sir Charles Hulse, Bt
Preceded by Sir William Henry Pringle; Lord Eliot	Member of Parliament for Liskeard; 1832–1849	Succeeded by Richard Budden Crowder
Political offices
Preceded by Lord Seymour; William Clay	Joint Secretary to the Board of Control; 1841; With: William Clay	Succeeded by James Emerson Tennent; Hon. Bingham Baring
New office	President of the Poor Law Board; 1846–1847	Succeeded by Matthew Talbot Baines
Legal offices
Preceded by Hon. James Stuart-Wortley	Judge Advocate General; 1846–1847	Succeeded by William Goodenough Hayter
