= Lord Francis Seymour =

British aristocrat and clergyman (1725–1799)

Lord Francis Seymour (1725 – 16 February 1799) was a clergyman of the Church of England and a younger son of Edward Seymour, 8th Duke of Somerset. He was Dean of Wells from 1766 until his death.

== Biography ==
Seymour was the fifth child and fourth son of Edward Seymour, 8th Duke of Somerset, the son and heir of Sir Edward Seymour, 5th Baronet, on whose death in December 1740 his father inherited manors in Wiltshire and Devon and the baronetcy.

On 10 October 1743, Seymour matriculated at Queen's College, Oxford, aged eighteen. However, Alumni Oxonienses does not record that he took a degree.

On 11 September 1744, with the unexpected death of George Seymour, Viscount Beauchamp (1725–1744), the only son of Algernon Seymour, 7th Duke of Somerset, the likelihood emerged of Seymour's father succeeding a distant cousin as Duke of Somerset, as the Duke was then aged sixty and his wife was past child-bearing age. On 23 November 1750 the Duke died, Seymour's father duly succeeded to his titles, but not most of his estates, and Seymour thus gained the courtesy title of Lord Francis. Being the son of a Duke gave him better prospects of advancement.

In 1752 Lord Francis was appointed as chaplain-in-ordinary to King George II, and in 1755 he was made Canon of the fourth stall at St George's Chapel, Windsor Castle, a position he held until 1766. He was then appointed as Dean of Wells a benefice he held from 1766 until his death on 16 February 1799.

When his elder brother Webb Seymour's male line died out in 1923, Lord Francis Seymour's great-great-grandson Colonel Edward Seymour inherited the family estates and became 16th Duke of Somerset, although it took him until 1925 to establish his claim to the dukedom.

== Ancestry ==
Ancestors of Lord Francis Seymour

Sir Edward Seymour, 3rd Baronet
Sir Edward Seymour, 4th Baronet
Anne Portman
Sir Edward Seymour, 5th Baronet
Sir William Wale
Margaret Wale
Edward Seymour, 8th Duke of Somerset
Alexander Popham
Sir Francis Popham
Letitia Carre
Laetitia Popham
Hugh Rogers of Cannington
Helena Rogers
Lord Francis Seymour
Robert Webb
Daniel Webb
Elizabeth Goddard
Mary Webb
John Somner
Elizabeth Somner
