= Dorman =

Dorman is a surname, derived from the Middle English word dere, or deor, meant "wild animal". Therefore, Dorman translates as "wild animal", or, perhaps, "wild animal-man". Another, Old English, derivation is from the Old English word deor, meaning "deer", and, mann, meaning "man": thus, Deer Man. Dorman is also a Turkic name which was widely used by the Cumans and Pechenegs. Americanized form of German Dormann: occupational name for a doorkeeper or gatekeeper or topographic name for someone who lived by the gate of a town or city. Compare Dorer Dorwart . Hungarian (Dormán): from the old personal name Dormán. Jewish (Ashkenazic): Tall, beautiful, God's chosen, exiled ones . Notable people with the surname include:

== People ==
- Dorman (12th century), was either a Cuman warrior in Bulgarian service or a Bulgarian noble of Cuman origin, who ruled the region of Braničevo as an independent state.
- Andy Dorman (born 1982), Welsh football (soccer) player
- Angela Dohrmann, American television actress
- Arabella Dorman (born 1965), British artist
- Sir Arthur Dorman, 1st Baronet (1848–1931), British industrialist, founder of Dorman Long
- Avner Dorman (born 1975), Israeli contemporary composer
- Dave Dorman (born 1958), American science fiction and fantasy illustrator
- David Dorman (born 1954), American telecommunications executive, chairman and chief executive officer of AT&T Inc.
- Eric Dorman-Smith (1895–1969), British Army officer
- Henry Dorman (1916–1998), American politician and lawyer
- Isaiah Dorman (died 1876), African American interpreter for the United States Army during the Indian Wars
- John J. Dorman (1870–1953), Fire Commissioner of the City of New York
- Lee Dorman (1942–2012), American bass guitarist, member of Iron Butterfly
- Maurice Henry Dorman (1902–1993), British diplomat, served as Governors-General of Sierra Leone and Malta
- Orloff M. Dorman (1809–1879), justice of the Supreme Court of Virginia
- Peter Dorman (born 1948), American epigraphist, philologist, and cultural anthropologist
- Reginald Dorman-Smith (1899–1977), British diplomat, soldier and politician, UK Minister of Agriculture
- Robert Dorman (1859–1937), Irish socialist activist
- Sonya Dorman (1924–2005), American poet
- Thomas Dorman (d. 1572 or 1577), English Catholic theologian of the sixteenth century

== Commerce ==
- Dorman Products, an American aftermarket manufacturer of car parts
- W.H. Dorman & Co, an English tool company serving the shoe industry

== Places ==
- Derman, Iran, sometimes romanized as "Dorman"
- Dormans, a French commune
- Dormanstown, area of Redcar, North Yorkshire

== Things ==
- Dorman raspberry

== See also ==
- Dohrmann
- Dorman High School
- Dorman Luke construction a type of Dual polyhedron
- Dorman Long a British engineering company
- Dorman Museum in Linthorpe, Middlesbrough
- W.H. Dorman & Co Ltd engine manufacturer in Stafford, UK
