= Charles Hedges =

British politician

Sir Charles Hedges (1649/50 – 10 June 1714), of Compton Bassett, Wiltshire, an English lawyer and politician, was Judge of the High Court of Admiralty from 1689 to 1714, and also served as one of Queen Anne's Secretaries of State.

== Life ==
Hedges was the son of Henry Hedges of Wanborough, Wiltshire, and his wife Margaret, daughter of Richard Pleydell of Childrey, Berkshire; he was educated at Magdalen Hall, Oxford (matriculated 1666, B.A. 1670, M.A. of Magdalen College 1673, and DCL with support of the Duke of Ormonde, Chancellor of the University 1675). By patent for life he was created chancellor and vicar-general of the Diocese of Rochester in 1686, where he was an advocate of moderation in a feverish time, and master of the faculties and judge of the Admiralty Court under William III, succeeding Sir Richard Raines, 1 June 1689, in which post he remained until his death, his expertise serving Parliament on numerous occasions. He was knighted shortly after his accession, on 4 June 1689.

Hedges was returned as MP for Orford in 1698, under the aegis of Ormonde as Chancellor of Oxford, but after counter-petitions were presented, Hedges and his colleagues were unseated by an election committee on 1 February 1700, and their decision was confirmed in the House by a majority of one vote on 10 February.

In the brief parliament of February 1701 Hedges sat for Dover, and at the election in November 1701 he was returned for Malmesbury and for Calne. His opponents endeavoured to eject him from both places, and the election for Calne was voided, but the petition against his return for Malmesbury failed. At the next election in August 1703 he was again returned for both Calne and Malmesbury and elected to serve for Calne. He unsuccessfully contested the constituency of Calne again in 1705 and 1708, but nevertheless retained a seat in parliament, as he was thrice (1705, 1708, 1710) returned for West Looe, and once (1713) for East Looe.

Hedges was a Tory supporter of Court policy, a client of Lord Rochester in contemporary eyes, but with manifest talent as a civilian lawyer, who usually voted in his own individual interest. Mainly through the influence of the Earl of Rochester he was sworn as secretary of state and privy councillor on 5 November 1700, when he was allowed by special permission of the king to remain judge of the Admiralty Court, and he continued to be judge until 29 December 1701. The Sarah, Duchess of Marlborough, supporting the Whig interest, said of him, "He has no capacity, no quality nor interest, nor ever could have been in that post but that everybody knows my Lord Rochester cares for nothing, so much as a man that he thinks will depend upon him'" He attended Queen Anne when she travelled to Bath in August 1702, and for a short time between April and May 1704 he was declared the sole secretary, both home and foreign, until a successor was appointed to the Earl of Nottingham.

During 1706 the Whigs constantly endeavoured to eject Hedges from office to make room for the Earl of Sunderland, and the queen at last submitted. The change was announced on 8 December 1706, but Hedges was mollified by promise of an appointment to the Prerogative Court of Canterbury, which came about in January 1711 on its vacation by Sir Richard Raines.

Hedges sat in the commission for the rebuilding of St. Paul's Cathedral. In November 1711 he was rumoured to be considered for the third plenipotentiary to negotiate the treaty of Utrecht, but it never came to pass.

Hedges' chief residence was from 1696 at Richmond Green, Surrey, which he sold to Sir Matthew Decker, 1st Baronet (1679-1749) and in 1700 he bought the estate of Compton Camberwell, in Compton Bassett, Wiltshire, near his constituency of Calne; the Hedges arms are still preserved around the parapet of the house. He owned much property in Wiltshire and was buried at Wanborough.

== Family ==
Hedges' widow, Eleanor, daughter of George Smith, a proctor in London, died in 1733, and was also buried at Wanborough. They had one daughter Anne and three sons, Henry, William, and Charles.

His second cousin Sir William Hedges, a director of the Bank of England, had directed the Levant Company's "factory" at Constantinople.

== Notes ==
Parliament of England
Preceded by Sir Thomas Felton, Bt; Sir John Duke, Bt	Member of Parliament for Orford; 1698–1700; With: Sir Thomas Felton, Bt	Succeeded by Sir Edmund Bacon, Bt; William Johnson
Preceded by Sir Basil Dixwell, Bt; Matthew Aylmer	Member of Parliament for Dover; 1701; With: Matthew Aylmer	Succeeded by Matthew Aylmer; Philip Papillon
Preceded by Edward Pauncefort; Samuel Shepheard	Member of Parliament for Malmesbury; 1701–1702; With: Edward Pauncefort	Succeeded by Edward Pauncefort; Thomas Boucher
Preceded by Henry Blaake; Henry Chivers	Member of Parliament for Calne; 1702–1705; With: Henry Chivers	Succeeded by Edward Bayntun; George Duckett
Preceded by Charles Seymour; Henry Poley	Member of Parliament for West Looe; 1705–1707; With: John Mountstephen 1705–1707; Francis Palmes 1707	Succeeded by Parliament of Great Britain
Parliament of Great Britain
Preceded by Parliament of England	Member of Parliament for West Looe; 1707–1713; With: Francis Palmes 1707–1708; John Conyers 1708–1710; Arthur Maynwaring 1710–1713; Sir John Trelawny, Bt 1713	Succeeded by Sir John Trelawny, Bt; Sir Charles Wager
Preceded by Sir Henry Seymour, Bt; Thomas Smith	Member of Parliament for East Looe; 1713–1714; With: Edward Jennings	Succeeded by John Smith; Sir James Bateman
Political offices
Preceded by James Vernon	Secretary of State for the Northern Department; 1700–1701	Succeeded by James Vernon
Preceded by James Vernon	Secretary of State for the Northern Department; 1702–1704	Succeeded by Robert Harley
Preceded by The Earl of Nottingham	Secretary of State for the Southern Department; 1704–1706	Succeeded by The Earl of Sunderland
