= John Mounstephen =

English politician

John Mounstephen, also known as John Mounsteven, (28 April 1644 – 19 December 1706) was a Member of Parliament for the Cornish constituency of West Looe until he committed suicide in December 1706 following the disclosure he was an informer selling state secrets to the French.

== Family ==
Mounstephen was the second son of John Mounsteven and Elizabeth (relict of Tamlyn) of St Mabyn, Cornwall. He was educated at Bodmin school and Christ Church, Oxford. Mounstephen purchased the barton of Lancarffe (Helland) in 1685 from the Bullock family while secretary to the Earl of Sutherland. His brother, William inherited Lancarffe, after a jury returned a verdict of lunacy following John's suicide.

== Career ==
He was sponsored by the Robert Spencer, 2nd Earl of Sunderland for eighteen years, for whom he served as an under-secretary. On 19 December 1706, Mountstephen was at Brown's Coffee House, King Street, Westminster in the company of other MPs when he took out a razor from his pocket and slit his throat. His suicide was probably because it became public about his passing of state secrets to the King of France, in return for a pension, although there were rumours that he took his life after his proposal of marriage was rejected by someone of higher social standing.

Parliament of England
Preceded by Charles Robartes; Sir Peter Colleton	Member of Parliament for Bossiney; 1685–1687; With: John Cotton	Succeeded by Sir Peter Colleton; Humphrey Nicoll
Preceded by Edward Seymour; Jonathan Trelawny	Member of Parliament for West Looe; 1695–1701; With: James Kendall	Succeeded by The Earl of Ranelagh
Preceded by Charles Seymour; Henry Poley	Member of Parliament for West Looe; 1705–1706; With: Sir Charles Hedges	Succeeded by Francis Palmes
