= Anthony Buller (West Looe MP) =

Sir Anthony Buller
Personal information
- Full name: Anthony Buller
- Born: 26 July 1780
- Died: 27 June 1866 (aged 85)
- Role: Batsman

Domestic team information
- Years: Team
- 1797: C. Lennox's XI

Sir Anthony Buller (26 July 1780 – 27 June 1866) was an English lawyer and member of parliament.

He was the 7th son of John Buller (1745–1793), MP of Morval, Cornwall, who had represented Exeter, Launceston and West Looe in the British Parliament. Three of Anthony's brothers also became MPs. He was educated at Westminster School (1788–96) and studied law at Lincoln's Inn (1797), where he was called to the bar in 1803.

He represented West Looe in Parliament from 1812 to 1816 and was knighted in the latter year.

He practiced law on the Western circuit before being offered the post of Puisne Judge in Madras, India (which he may never have taken up) followed by the offer of a similar post in Bengal. He served as puisne judge in Supreme Court of Judicature at Fort William on the Bengal bench from 1816 to 1827 and on his return again represented West Looe from 1831 to 1832.

He was an English cricketer who was active in the 1790s playing for Westminster School and C. Lennox's XI. He is recorded playing in one important match in 1797, totalling 0 runs with a highest score of 0.

He married his cousin Isabella Jane, the daughter of Sir William Lemon, 1st Baronet and with her had 3 sons and 7 daughters.

== Bibliography ==
- Haygarth, Arthur (1996) [1862]. Scores & Biographies, Volume 1 (1744–1826). Kennington: Frederick Lillywhite. ISBN 978-19-00592-23-9.

Parliament of the United Kingdom
Preceded by Ralph Allen Daniell; Sir Joseph Yorke	Member of Parliament for West Looe; 1812–1816; With: Charles Buller	Succeeded by Hon. Henry FitzGerald-de Ros; Sir Charles Hulse
Preceded by Sir Charles Hulse; Charles Buller	Member of Parliament for West Looe; 1831–1832; With: Sir Charles Hulse	Constituency abolished
