= Arthur Maynwaring =

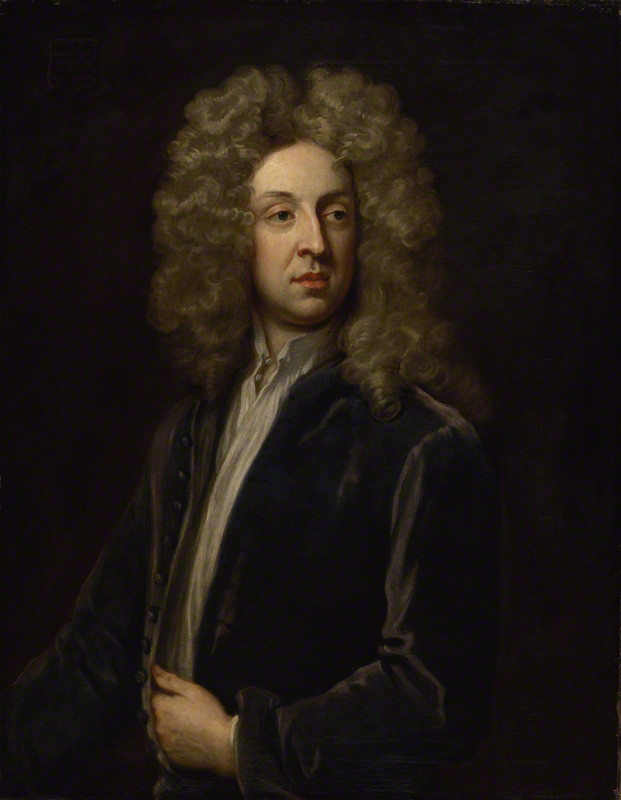
Arthur Maynwaring

Arthur Maynwaring or Mainwaring (9 July 1668 – 13 November 1712), of Ightfield, Shropshire, was an English official and Whig politician who sat in the English and British House of Commons from 1706 to 1712. He was also a journalist and a polemic political author.

== Early life ==
Maynwaring was born at Ightfield, the son of Charles Maynwaring of Ightfield, and his wife Katherine Cholmondeley, daughter of Thomas Cholmondeley of Vale Royal, Cheshire. His grandfather was Sir Arthur Mainwaring. He was educated at Shrewsbury School and matriculated at Christ Church, Oxford, on 23 November 1683, aged 15. In 1687 he was admitted at the Inner Temple.

Maynwaring supported the losing Jacobite side at the Glorious Revolution. For many years, he lived with his uncle, Francis Cholmondeley, who refused to take the oaths to William and Mary, and was encouraged in his Stuart sympathies by a non-juring relation, Sir Philip Egerton. From Cheshire he came to live with his father in Essex Street, Strand, London, to study law. He wrote an article in favour of James II and attacking the supporters of the Revolution, which attracted the attention of his Whig relations, Lord Cholmondeley and the Duke of Somerset. These, with Earl of Burlington introduced him to the circle of Lord Somers and other prominent Whigs, and Maynwaring altered his politics.

== Political career ==
On his father's death around 1693, Maynwaring inherited an estate, gave up the law, and raising money on Ightfield, devoted himself to political and social life. When the treaty of Ryswick in 1697 reopened communication with France he went to Paris, where he met Boileau and La Fontaine. Now a Whig, he was made a member of the Kit-Cat Club, and received through Montague a commissionership of customs. In 1705 Sidney Godolphin rewarded his political services by appointing him auditor of imprests. His relationship with the actress Anne Oldfield began somewhat earlier. He was a close friend of Sarah Churchill, Duchess of Marlborough, and considered himself her secretary.

Maynwaring was elected in a contest as Member of Parliament for the borough of Preston on the interest of the Earl of Derby, at a by-election on 27 December 1706. Early in 1708 he was appointed secretary to the Duchess of Marlborough, whom he saw as a key ally in forwarding the Whig cause. He was returned unopposed as Whig MP for Preston at the 1708 British general election. He supported the naturalization of the Palatines, and between 1709 and 1710 was a fiery advocate of the prosecution of Henry Sacheverell. He also became embroiled in the Court intrigues at the time of the Duchess's falling out with the Queen and the ascendency of Mrs Masham. At the 1710 British general election, he was returned instead as MP for West Looe.

Maynwaring's health gave way, as he went down with consumption. He worked on at journalism, incessantly, towards the end of the War of the Spanish Succession, and kept up his duties as auditor in person.

== Works ==
A first literary effort, Tarquin and Tullia, an outspoken satire on William III and Mary II, was published by Maynwaring quite soon after moving to London. The next year, in the King of Hearts, he ridiculed Henry Booth, 1st Earl of Warrington, and his Cheshire men entering London in state. The verses, published anonymously, sold well, were attributed to John Dryden, and made the author's fortune. He wrote a number of prologues for Anne Oldfield.

Maynwaring attacked Sacheverell and his supporters in a merciless fashion in the Letters to a Friend in North Britain. Hannibal and Hanno, a defence of the Duke of Marlborough, belongs to the same period.

The exact part taken by Maynwaring in the Whig Examiner, the first number of which appeared on 14 September 1710, five weeks after its rival the Tory Examiner, is not clear. Dissatisfied with the shared name Examiner, while running the paper, he planned The Medley, and on 5 October the first number was issued. During the ten months that it lasted the Medley was almost entirely Maynwaring's own work, hounding the Examiner with criticisms. Robert Harley to try to gag it, but the attorney-general refused to move.

With 1711 the Tory position seemed secure; on 26 July the Examiner was dropped, and in the following week the last Medley was printed. Grub Street, Jonathan Swift pronounced, was dead. He published an attack on French policy towards the close of the year; in 1712 he was engaged on a history of the march to the battle of Blenheim, based on a diary kept by Francis Hare. A fragment was printed, by John Oldmixon.

== Death and legacy ==
Maynwaring died on 14 November 1712. He never married but had an illegitimate son Arthur by his mistress of eight years, Ann Oldfield. He left his property equally between Anne Oldfield, his sister who had nursed him during his final illness, and his son Arthur Maynwaring to be used on his education. Three months after his death, 9 February 1713, the Tory Examiner attacked his character, and Robert Walpole replied.

== Notes ==
Attribution

This article incorporates text from a publication now in the public domain: Lee, Sidney, ed. (1893). "Mainwaring, Arthur". Dictionary of National Biography. Vol. 35. London: Smith, Elder & Co.

Political offices
| Preceded by Brook Bridges; Edward Harley | Auditor of the imprests 1705–1712; With: Edward Harley | Succeeded by Edward Harley; Thomas Foley |
Parliament of England
| Preceded by Francis Annesley; Edward Rigby | Member of Parliament for Preston; 1706–1707; With: Francis Annesley | Succeeded by Parliament of Great Britain |
Parliament of Great Britain
| Preceded by Parliament of England | Member of Parliament for Preston; 1707–1710; With: Francis Annesley to 1708; Henry Fleetwood from 1708 | Succeeded by Henry Fleetwood; Sir Henry Hoghton, Bt |
| Preceded by Sir Charles Hedges; John Conyers | Member of Parliament for West Looe; 1710–1712; With: Sir Charles Hedges | Succeeded by Sir Charles Hedges; John Trelawny |
