= Bramling =

Hamlet in Kent, England

Coordinates: 51.266°N 1.191°E

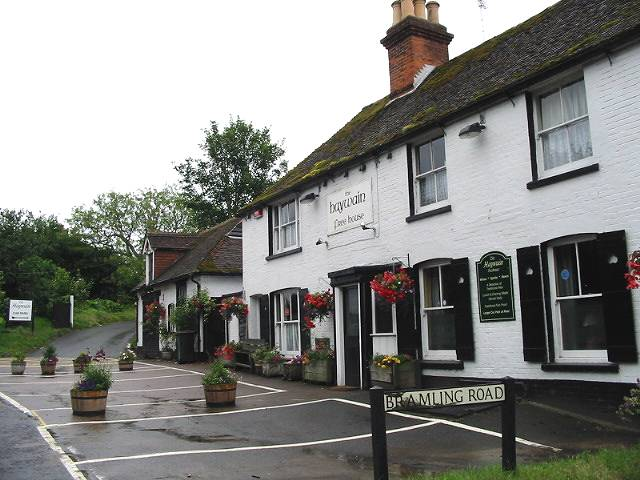
- The Haywain inn, Bramling

- Location within Kent
- District: City of Canterbury
- Shire county: Kent
- Region: South East
- Country: England
- Sovereign state: United Kingdom
- Post town: Canterbury
- Postcode district: CT3
- Police: Kent
- Fire: Kent
- Ambulance: South East Coast

Bramling is a hamlet five miles (8 km) east of Canterbury in Kent, England. It lies on the A257 road between Littlebourne and Wingham. The local public house is called The Haywain. The population of the hamlet taken at the 2011 Census was included in the civil parish of Ickham and Well

== Geography ==
Nearby are, or were, Bramling Bottom, Bramling Downs, and Bramlingcourt Farm. Bramling House, described as a fine example of Elizabethan architecture, was the seat of the Wood Family, whose scion, Thomas Philpott Wood also established Bramling House in Chesterfield. Bramling House and Bramlingcourt Farm are in the Bramling conservation area.

== History ==
Bramling is mentioned in the Pipe Rolls of Henry III c. 1220, in reference to one Ralph of Bramling, Kent.
