= Nicholas Fazakerley =

English lawyer and politician

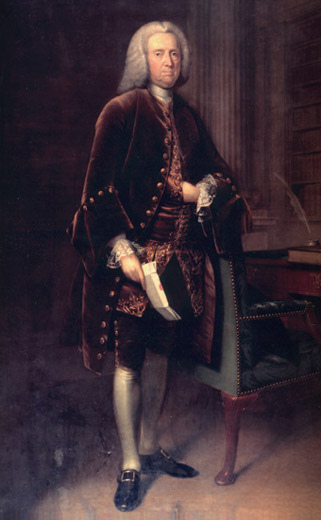
Nicholas Fazakerley by Arthur Devis

Nicholas Fazakerley (bapt. 2 November 1682 – 26 February 1767), of Prescot, Merseyside, was an English lawyer and politician who sat in the House of Commons from 1732 to 1767.

== Early life ==
Fazakerley was the son of William Fazakerley, of Kirkby, Merseyside, whose family hailed from nearby Fazakerley. He was probably at Eton College in 1698 and matriculated at Brasenose College, Oxford on 12 March 1702, aged 17. He was admitted at Middle Temple in 1700, and was called to the bar in 1707. On 9 February 1714, he was admitted of the Inner Temple from Middle Temple. He married Ann Lutwyche, daughter of Sir Thomas Lutwyche, MP, on 10 October 1723.

== Legal career ==
At first Fazakerley practised chiefly in chambers as an equity counsel, but as his practice grew he began to appear not only in the equity court, but in the courts of common law, mostly to argue questions connected with conveyancing and the transfer of real property. Occasionally his knowledge of constitutional law led him to be retained in state trials.

Among his cases was the trial of Richard Francklin, a Fleet Street bookseller, on 3 December 1731, for publishing in The Craftsman of 2 January the letter from The Hague said to have been written by Lord Bolingbroke. Fazakerley was retained along with Thomas Bootle for the defence, and, in the words of Lord Mansfield, 'started every objection and laboured every point as if the fate of the empire had been at stake'.

Fazakerley became a Bencher of Lincoln's Inn in 1736 and was counsel to Cambridge University from 1738 to 1757. In August 1742 he was appointed recorder of Preston, an office he held for the rest of his life. His politics, however, prevented his attaining the honours of his profession and he never became K.C.

== In politics ==
Fazakerley was elected in a contest as Tory member of parliament for Preston at a by-election on 24 January 1732 and retained his seat unopposed at the 1734 British general election two years later. He was a Jacobite of the cautious type. He was listened to with attention, and by a section of his party came to be regarded as a leader. In a debate on the convention with Spain, 9 March 1739, whereby peace was secured on payment by the Spanish government of a compensation to English traders, he declared that if Sir Robert Walpole 'were determined to carry it by a majority, he would never again appear in the house till he perceived a change of measures'. He was returned at the head of the poll in the contested election of 1741 and returned unopposed in 1747. He also distinguished himself in the debates in May 1751, on Lord Hardwicke's Regency Bill, especially by his resolute opposition to the marriage clause. There is a story that Walpole prevailed on Hardwicke, then Sir Philip Yorke, to quit the chief justiceship for the chancellorship, by the declaration: 'If by one o'clock you do not accept my offer, Fazakerley by two becomes lord keeper of the great seal, and one of the staunchest whigs in all England!’. Another of his speeches which attracted attention was that delivered against the Jews' Naturalisation Bill, 7 May 1753.

Fazakerley was returned unopposed as Tory MP for Preston in the general elections of 1754 and 1761.

== Later life ==
Fazakerley died at his house in Grosvenor Street, London, in February 1767, predeceased by both his children. His son died on 30 June 1737. His daughter, Elizabeth, married, with a dowry of £16,000, Lord Tretham on 23 December 1744. She died on 19 May 1745.

Parliament of Great Britain
Preceded by Daniel Pulteney; Sir Henry Hoghton	Member of Parliament for Preston; 1732–1767; With: Sir Henry Hoghton 1732–1741; James Shuttleworth 1741–1754; Edmund Starkie 1754–1767	Succeeded by Sir Peter Leicester; Edmund Starkie
