= Ickham and Well =

Civil parish in Kent, England

Coordinates: 51.27°N 1.19°E

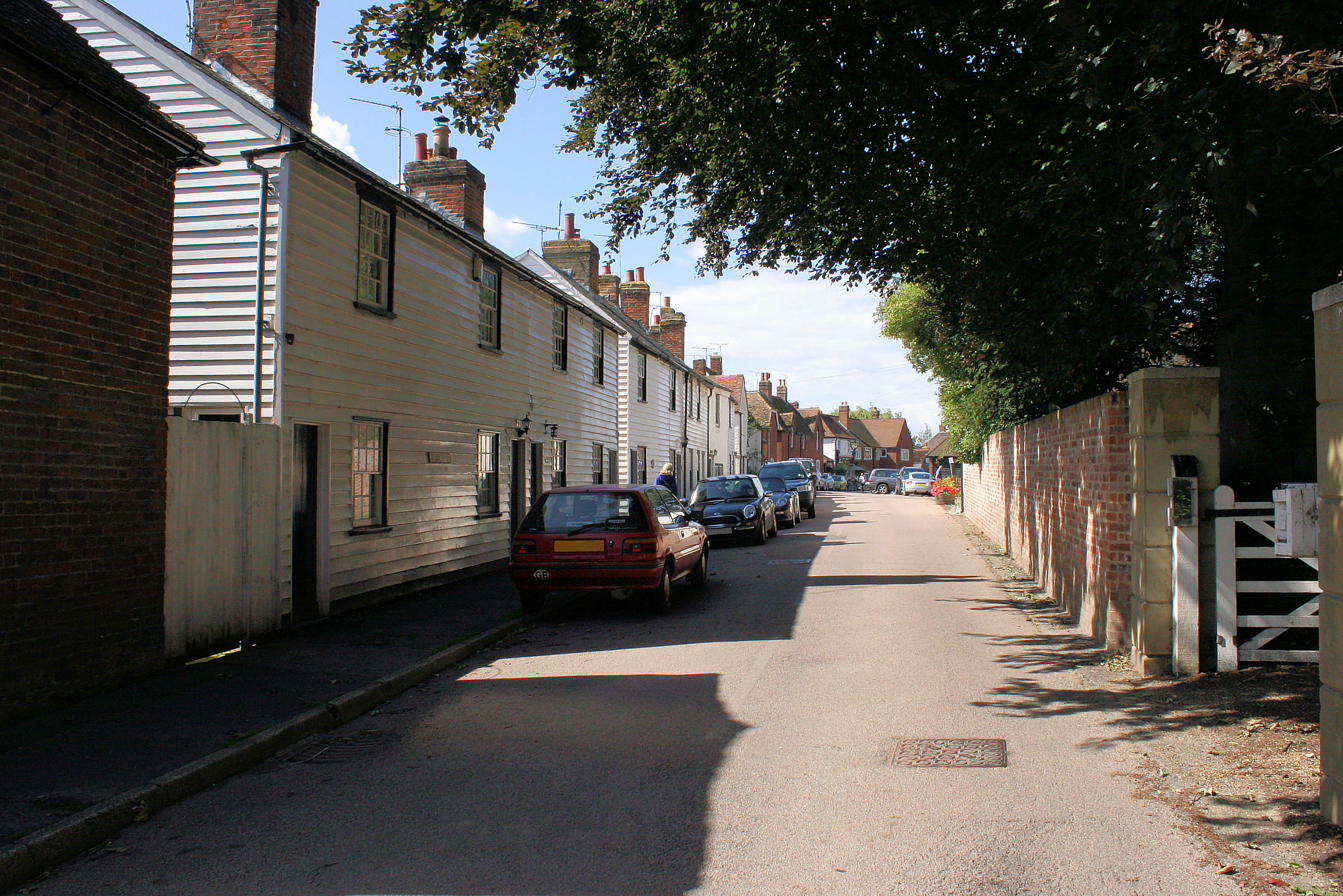
- The Street, Ickham

- Location within Kent
- Area: 9.3 km^{2} (3.6 sq mi)
- Population: 437 (Civil Parish 2011)
  - Density: 47/km^{2} (120/sq mi)
- OS grid reference: TR221581
- Civil parish: Ickham and Well
- District: City of Canterbury
- Shire county: Kent
- Region: South East
- Country: England
- Sovereign state: United Kingdom
- Post town: CANTERBURY
- Postcode district: CT3
- Dialling code: 01227
- Police: Kent
- Fire: Kent
- Ambulance: South East Coast
- UK Parliament: Canterbury

Ickham and Well is a mostly rural civil parish east of Canterbury in Kent, South East England.

The parish covers the villages of Ickham and Bramling just off the A257 Sandwich Road. It has several listed buildings in architecture of old, well-preserved houses, with the 13th-century parish church of St John the Evangelist in the midst. A recent archaeological excavation at Ickham has revealed evidence of Roman metalwork and copper brooches.

== Geography ==
Ickham centres on a single road.

The Rivers Little Stour and Wingham flow through the parish before joining with the Great Stour to become the River Stour.

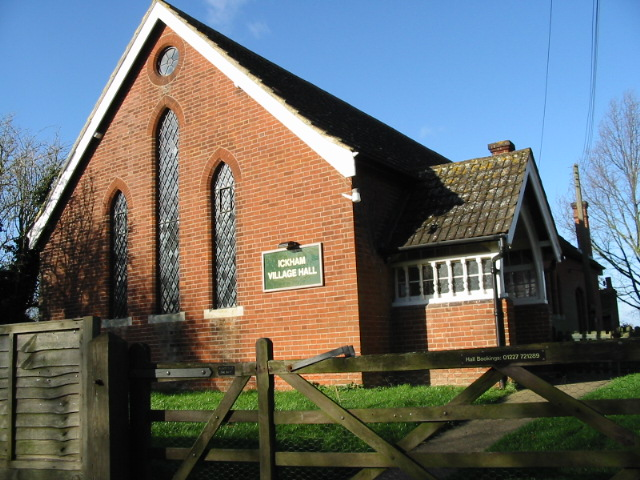
Ickham Village hall

== Notable people ==
- Edward Isaac (16th-century), English Protestant and Marian exile.
- J. G. Robertson (1859–1940), British singer and actor died in Ickham.
