= Henry Trelawny =

English politician and Army officer

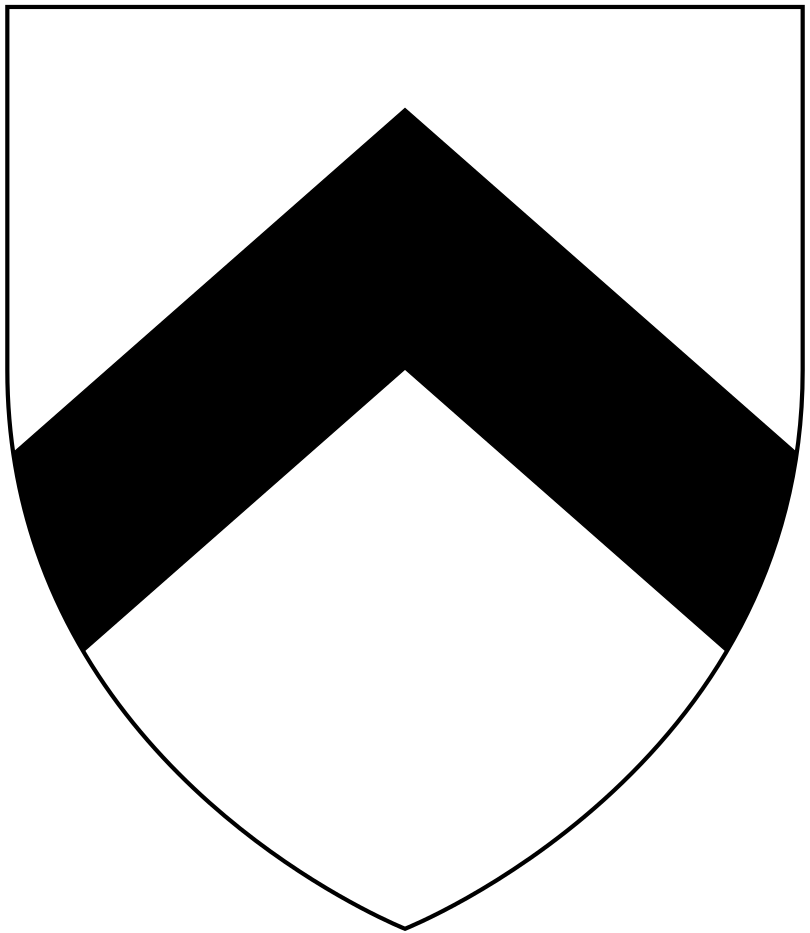
Arms of Trelawny: Argent, a chevron sable

Brigadier-General Henry Trelawny (ca. 1658 – 8 January 1702) was a British Army officer of Cornish descent, a Member of Parliament and Vice-Admiral of Cornwall.

== Origins ==
He was the seventh and youngest son of Sir Jonathan Trelawny, 2nd Baronet, of Trelawny in the parish of Pelynt in Cornwall, patron of the nearby pocket borough of East Looe in Cornwall, by his wife Mary Seymour (born 1619), 6th daughter of Sir Edward Seymour, 2nd Baronet (c. 1580–1659) of Berry Pomeroy in Devon, great-grandson of Edward Seymour, 1st Duke of Somerset, Lord Protector of England and eldest brother of Queen Jane Seymour (d.1537), the third wife of King Henry VIII.

== Career ==
From 1678 to 1681 he was a lieutenant of foot in the Admiral's Regiment. He then obtained a captain's commission in the 2nd Tangier Regiment, commanded by his brother Charles. Made a freeman of the City of Portsmouth in 1683 and of the Borough of East Looe in 1685, he was returned to Parliament in the latter year for West Looe as a Tory on the interest of his eldest brother, Sir Jonathan Trelawny, 3rd Baronet, Bishop of Bristol, Bishop of Exeter and Bishop of Winchester, "Bishop Trelawny", best known for his role in the events leading up to the Glorious Revolution which are referenced in the Cornish anthem The Song of the Western Men. In 1687 he was appointed to the commission of the peace for Cornwall.

During the Glorious Revolution, Charles, with a number of officers and men, including Henry, went over to William of Orange. Both Charles and Henry were returned to the Convention Parliament for East Looe, sitting as Tories. Both served as commissioners for assessment in Cornwall and Devon from 1689 to 1690.

Both brothers were again returned for East Looe as Court Tories in 1690, and continued to sit for the borough until 1698. In early 1692 Charles Trelawny resigned the colonelcy of The Queen Consort's Regiment of Foot (the former 2nd Tangier Regiment) in protest over King William's supposed partiality to foreign officers, and Henry replaced him as colonel. He left with the regiment to campaign in Flanders in March, and as a result came to be regarded as a court supporter in Parliament. Trelawny was again absent from Parliament in 1693 with his regiment in Flanders, where they fought at the Battle of Landen. In November 1693 Trelawny was appointed Vice-Admiral of South Cornwall in place of his elder brother, Bishop Trelawny. In this post, he was active in raising men for naval service over the next few years. While generally a court supporter, he was thought likely to oppose the proposed Council of Trade in the 1696 session. He signed the Association Oath and, unlike his brother, supported fixing the guinea at 22shillings. In 1696 he was a commissioner for receiving subscriptions to the abortive land bank project.

Trelawny took part in the 1696 and 1697 campaigns in Flanders, and was promoted to brigadier-general during the former. In the autumn of 1698 he and Charles were again returned for East Looe, and Charles was also returned for Plymouth, where he served as Governor of Plymouth and for which he preferred to sit. Their first cousin Sir Henry Seymour, 1st Baronet replaced Charles at East Looe in a by-election in January 1699. Henry opposed the bill for disbanding much of the standing army in 1699, although his regiment was not affected. He went on half-pay in March 1700.

In February 1701 he was returned with Charles for Plymouth, allowing Francis Godolphin to take the seat at East Looe. By 1701 he had been appointed a Justice of the Peace for Devon. He opposed preparations for the English entry into the War of the Spanish Succession, but died on 8 January 1702. A large funeral was held for him at Plymouth.

== Marriages and progeny ==
He married twice:

- Firstly on 8 January 1690 to Rebecca Hals (1661-1699), 5th daughter of Matthew Hals (d.1675/6) of Efford in the parish of Eggbuckland, and of Kenedon in the parish of Sherford, both in Devon, and a co-heiress of her brother Matthew Hals (d.1684) of Efford, from whom she inherited the manor of Efford. By Rebecca he had two sons and three daughters:
  - Sir Harry Trelawny, 5th Baronet (1687–1762), an aide-de-camp to the Duke of Marlborough and a Member of Parliament
  - Mary Trelawny (bap. 1688 – bef. 1731), wife of Thomas Brereton
  - Ann Trelawny (bap. 1689 – 1701)
  - Elizabeth Trelawny (bap. 1692)
  - Captain William Trelawny (bap. 1696), who married Mary Bisset by whom he had four sons:
    - Charles Trelawny, died without issue
    - Sir William Trelawny, 6th Baronet (c.1722–1772)
    - Lt-Gen. Harry Trelawny (1725–1800), married Mary Dormer and had issue
    - Thomas Trelawny (d. 1809), of Odiham
- Secondly on 26 March 1701 he married Mary Trevill, widow of Thomas Stawell of Bickington, Devon, and a daughter of Richard Trevill of Budockshed (alias Butshead) in Devon; without progeny.

Parliament of England
Preceded by John Trelawny; Jonathan Trelawny	Member of Parliament for West Looe; 1685–1687; With: James Kendall	Succeeded by James Kendall; Percy Kirke
Preceded by Charles Trelawny; Sir William Trumbull	Member of Parliament for East Looe; 1689–1700; With: Charles Trelawny 1689–1699; Sir Henry Seymour, Bt 1699–1700	Succeeded by Sir Henry Seymour, Bt; Francis Godolphin
Preceded by Charles Trelawny; Sir John Rogers, Bt	Member of Parliament for Plymouth; 1701–1702; With: Charles Trelawny	Succeeded by Charles Trelawny; John Woolcombe
Military offices
Preceded by Charles Trelawny	Colonel of The Queen Consort's Regiment of Foot; 1692–1702	Succeeded by William Seymour
Honorary titles
Preceded by Jonathan Trelawny	Vice-Admiral of South Cornwall; 1693–1702	Succeeded by Charles Trelawny
