= Lady Catherine Jones =

English philanthropist

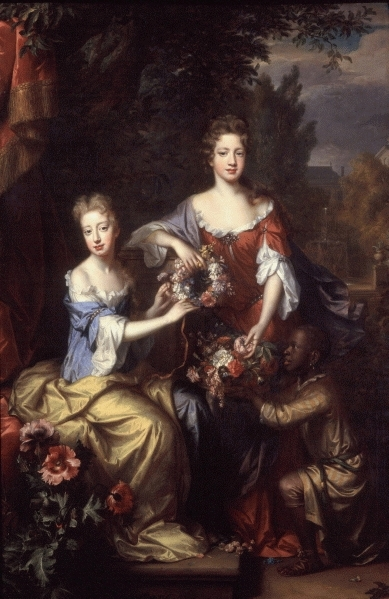
Frances, Lady Coningsby, and her twin sister Lady Catherine Jones by Willem Wissing, 1687

Lady Catherine Jones (1672 – 14 April 1740) was an English philanthropist. She was interested in women's rights and education, and chose to be buried with her long-time friend Mary Kendall (8 November 1677 – 4 March 1710) inside Westminster Abbey.

== Biography ==
Lady Catherine Jones was the daughter of Richard Jones, 1st Earl of Ranelagh, and Elizabeth (d. 1695), daughter of Francis Willoughby, 5th Baron Willoughby of Parham. Her sister, Elizabeth, married John FitzGerald, 18th Earl of Kildare. Her twin sister Frances (1672–1715) married Thomas Coningsby, 1st Earl Coningsby. Her brothers, Edward (1675–1678) and Arthur, died young. Her own grandmother, Katherine Jones, Viscountess Ranelagh, was a female scientist, a political and religious philosopher, and a member of many intellectual circles including the Hartlib Circle, the Great Tew Circle, and the Invisible College.

In 1695 John Norris, philosopher, dedicated Letters Concerning the Love of God to Lady Catherine; the letters were exchanged between Norris and Mary Astell.

At the death of her father in 1711, Lady Catherine inherited Ranelagh House, built by her father adjoining the Royal Hospital Chelsea. Twenty years later she let it to two builders who re-let it to James Lacy, who with David Garrick managed the Theatre Royal, Drury Lane. In 1741, after the death of Lady Catherine, Ranelagh House was sold to Crispe and Meyomet, who erected a rotunda in its place.

In 1716 Lady Catherine was living on Jews' Row where she continued to live until after Mary Astell's death in 1731 (Astell moved with her in 1726), although in 1730, her house is listed as empty. After withdrawing from public life in 1709, Astell founded a charity school for girls in Chelsea. According to the reports at present in the Royal Hospital Chelsea, this charity school for the education of the daughters of the Pensioners of Chelsea Hospital was established in 1729 by Lady Catherine, Lady Elizabeth Hastings, Lady Ann Coventry and other benevolent persons. When she was 60 years old, in 1726, Astell was invited to live with Jones, with whom she resided until her death in 1731. A letter from Thomas Birch to George Ballard stated that Astell lived with Lady Catherine in Chelsea. One more possible trace of residence occurred in a letter from Astell to Sir Hans Sloane dated 25 April 1724, from Manor Street.

Lady Catherine died on 14 April 1740.

== Burial and relationship with Kendall ==
Lady Catherine's remains were buried in the chapel of St John the Baptist in Westminster Abbey, with those of Mary Kendall, who had died on 4 March 1710. The inscription reads:

"Mrs Mary Kendall daughter of Thomas Kendall Esqr. and of Mrs Mary Hallet, his wife, of Killigarth in Cornwall, was born at Westmr. Nov.8 1677 and dy'd at Epsome March 4, 1709/10, having reach'd the full term of her blessed Saviour's life; and study'd to imitate his spotless example. She had great virtues, and as great a desire of concealing them: was of a severe life, but of an easy conversation; courteous to all, yet strictly sincere; humble, without meanness; beneficient, without ostentation; devout, without superstition. These admirable qualitys, in which she was equall'd by few of her sex, surpass'd by none, render'd her every way worthy of that close union and friendship in which she liv'd with the Lady Catherine Jones; and in testimony of which she desir'd that even their ashes, after death, might not be divided: and, therefore, order'd her selfe here to be interr'd where, she knew, that excellent Lady design'd one day to rest, near the grave of her belov'd and religious mother, Elizabeth, Countess of Ranelagh. This monument was erected by Capt. Charles Kendall".

Mary Kendall was the niece of James Kendall, politician and governor of Barbados, who is buried in the south choir aisle of Westminster Abbey. She was born at Westminster in London on 8 November 1677, the daughter of Thomas Kendall, Esquire (d. 1684), and of Mary Hallet, of Killigarth, Cornwall. She lived with Lady Catherine, and when she died, on 4 March 1709/10, she asked to be buried in the chapel of St John the Baptist in Westminster Abbey since she knew that Lady Catherine wanted to rest near her mother, Elizabeth, Countess of Ranelagh, who was already buried there. Moreover, Mary Kendall asked that, considering the "close union and friendship in which she lived with the Lady Catherine Jones [...] she desired that even their ashes, after death, might not be divided".
