= Thomas Dorman =

English Catholic theologian and controversialist

Thomas Dorman (? at Berkhamsted, Hertfordshire, England, date uncertain – 1572 or 1577 at Tournai) was an English Catholic theologian and controversialist. Exiled from England under the Elizabethan Religious Settlement, Dorman became a thought leader among the recusants, and was an early member of the English College at Douai.

== Life ==
Dorman received his early education through his uncle, Thomas Dorman of Agmondesham (now Amersham), Buckinghamshire. His master at Berkhampstead was Richard Reeve, a noted Protestant schoolmaster. He was also known to Thomas Harding, the Catholic scholar, then professor of Hebrew at Oxford, who took great interest in the boy and sent him to Winchester School in 1547. From Winchester Dorman went to New College, Oxford, of which Harding was a fellow, and here he was elected a probationer fellow.

Under Mary I of England, Dorman was appointed fellow of All Souls College (1554), and, on 9 July 1558, took the degree B.C.L. A year or two after Elizabeth I of England's accession, finding that he could not live in England without conforming to the Church of England, he gave up his fellowship and his patrimony and went to Antwerp, where he met Harding who was also in exile. Harding persuaded him to resume his studies, and Dorman accordingly went to the Catholic University of Leuven and devoted himself to the study of theology.

In 1565, Dorman became B.D. in the University of Douai and finally received the doctorate there. During this period he engaged in controversy with the Anglican divines John Jewel, Bishop of Salisbury and Alexander Nowell, Dean of St. Paul's. Alongside other recusant writers such as Harding, Thomas Stapleton, John Martiall, William Allen, Richard Shacklock, Nicholas Sander, Henry Cole, and John Rastell, Dorman protested the treatment of English Catholics, and argued for the authority of the Catholic Church over temporal monarchs. Dorman's other controversies included defending the Catholic doctrine of transubstantiation against its Anglican critics, and criticizing actors for popularizing Protestantism.

In 1569, at the invitation of Cardinal William Allen, Dorman joined the newly founded English College at Douai, which he assisted both by his services and his private means. He died at Tournai where he had been given an important benefice.

== Works ==
His works are:

- A proufe of certeyne articles in Religion denied by M. Juel (Antwerp, 1564);
- A Disproufe of M. Nowelle's Reproufe (Antwerp, 1565);
- A Request to Mr. Jewel that he keep his promise made by solemn Protestation in his late Sermon at Paul's Cross (London, 1567; Louvain, 1567).
