= Daniel Pulteney =

English government official and politician

Daniel Pulteney (c. 1684 – 7 September 1731) was an English government official and politician who sat in the House of Commons from 1721 to 1731.

== Biography ==
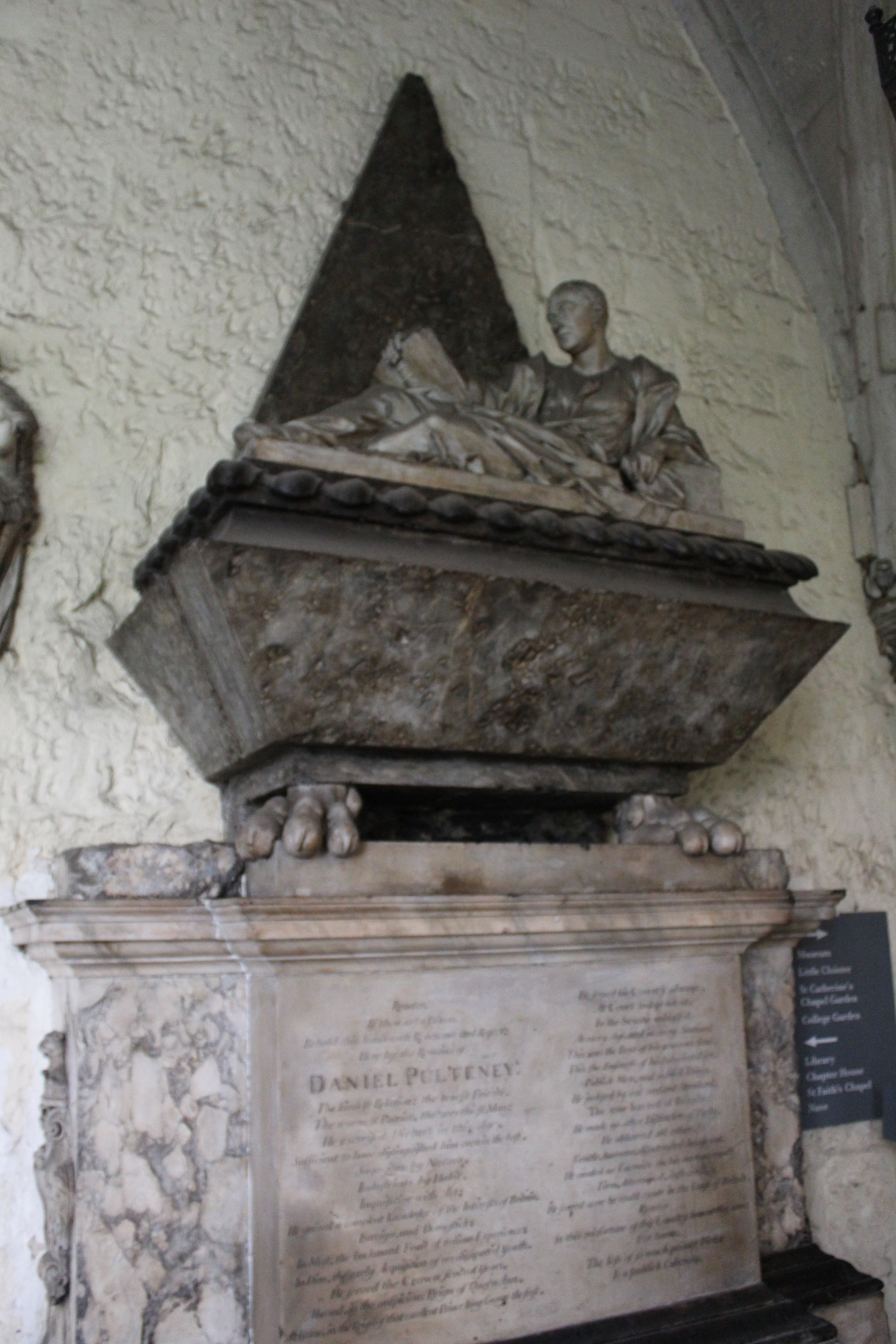
Daniel Pulteney's memorial in the cloisters at Westminster Abbey, London

Pulteney was the son of John Pulteney (d. 1726), MP for Hastings and Commissioner of Customs, and Lucy Colville. He studied at Christ Church, Oxford, matriculating in 1699.

He was one of the Commissioners for Trade and Plantations between July 1717 and October 1721. He entered Parliament in March 1721 as Member of Parliament for Tregony in Cornwall. In September he was appointed a Lord of the Admiralty, a post which he held until 1725. He was also later appointed Clerk of the Council in Ireland.

At the general election of 1722, Pulteney was elected for two constituencies, Hedon (the Yorkshire borough owned by his cousin William Pulteney, who was its other MP) and Preston, which he chose to represent. He sat as Preston's MP for the remaining nine years of his life. Although a Whig, he detested Robert Walpole. At first he was enthusiastic supporter of Sunderland, having married his wife's sister; after Sunderland's fall he was one of the early members of the Patriot Whigs (of which William Pulteney quickly became the central figure).

He married Margaret Tichborne (c. 1699–1763), daughter of Benjamin Tichborne, on 14 December 1717. Their three sons all died in childhood. His youngest daughter, Frances, who married William Johnstone, inherited the vast Pulteney fortune from Daniel's cousins, at which her husband changed his name to Pulteney.

Daniel Pulteney died on 7 September 1731 at Harefield in Middlesex and was buried in Westminster Abbey.

Diplomatic posts
Preceded by James Vernon the younger	British Ambassador to Denmark; 1706–1715	Succeeded by Alexander Hume-Campbell
Parliament of Great Britain
Preceded by Charles Talbot; James Craggs	Member of Parliament for Tregony; 1721–1722; With: Charles Talbot	Succeeded by Charles Talbot; John Merrill
Preceded by William Pulteney; Hugh Cholmley	Member of Parliament for Hedon; 1722; With: William Pulteney	Succeeded by William Pulteney; Harry Pulteney
Preceded by Henry Fleetwood; Sir Henry Hoghton	Member of Parliament for Preston; 1722–1731; With: Thomas Hesketh, 1722–27; Sir Henry Hoghton, 1727–31	Succeeded by Nicholas Fazackerley; Sir Henry Hoghton
