= Edward Seymour, 8th Duke of Somerset =

British politician

His Grace The Duke of Somerset
- Coat of arms of the Seymour family

Member of the Great Britain Parliament for Salisbury
- In office 1741–1747 Serving with Sir Jacob Bouverie
- Preceded by: Peter Bathurst; Henry Hoare
- Succeeded by: Hon. William Bouverie; Edward Poore

Personal details
- Born: December 1694 or early 1695
- Died: December 1757
- Resting place: Maiden Bradley, Wiltshire, England
- Children: Edward Seymour, 9th Duke of Somerset; Webb Seymour, 10th Duke of Somerset; Lord Francis Seymour
- Parent: Sir Edward Seymour, 5th Baronet (father)

Edward Seymour, 8th Duke of Somerset (December 1694 or early 1695 – December 1757) was an English peer and landowner.

== Family ==
The son of Sir Edward Seymour, 5th Baronet, of Berry Pomeroy, a descendant of Lord Protector Somerset by his first marriage, to Catherine Fillol, Edward Seymour was baptised at Easton Royal, Wiltshire, on 17 January 1694.

On 8 March 1716 or 5 March 1717, at Monkton Farleigh, Edward Seymour married Mary Webb (born at Seend on 22 October 1697, died 1 February 1768, and buried at Seend), a daughter of Daniel Webb, of Monkton Farleigh, and wife Elizabeth Somner, daughter of John Somner, of Seend. They had at least five children. His first cousin was Francis Seymour, 1st Marquess of Hertford, son of his uncle Francis Seymour-Conway, 1st Baron Conway

== Inheritance and titles ==
In December 1740, his father died and Seymour inherited his manors in Wiltshire and Devon. On 11 September 1744, with the unexpected death of George Seymour, Viscount Beauchamp (1725–1744), the only son of Algernon Seymour, Earl of Hertford, himself son and heir of Charles Seymour, 6th Duke of Somerset, the likelihood emerged of Seymour succeeding his distant cousin as Duke of Somerset and Baron Seymour, as the future 7th Duke was then aged sixty, and his wife was past child-bearing age. On 23 November 1750, the Duke died, and Seymour duly succeeded to his titles. However, he inherited little of the great wealth enjoyed by his two immediate predecessors, as the 7th Duke had arranged for the principal Percy family estates and houses of Alnwick Castle, Northumberland House, Petworth House, and Syon House to be divided between his daughter Elizabeth and his nephew Charles Wyndham. As a result, the Dukes of Somerset were never again among the greatest landowning families.

== Progeny ==
Seymour's children were all born long before the dukedom came to him:

- Edward Seymour, 9th Duke of Somerset (2 January 1717 – 2 January 1792)
- Webb Seymour, 10th Duke of Somerset (3 December 1718 – 15 December 1793)
- Lord William Seymour (1724 – 5 November 1800), m. 5 June 1767 Hester Maltravers (d. May 1812), and had issue:
  - Edward Seymour (b. 3 May 1768)
  - William Seymour (b. 28 March 1769)
  - Hester Seymour (b. 24 November 1770)
- Very Reverend Lord Francis Seymour (1726 – 16 February 1799), Dean of Wells Cathedral, m. 1749 Catherine Payne (d. 24 December 1801), and had issue, from which descended Edward Seymour, 16th Duke of Somerset; also an ancestor of Colonel Henry Abel Smith husband of Lady May Abel Smith, born Princess of Teck, great-granddaughter of Queen Victoria.
- Lady Mary Seymour (1744 – 21 July 1762), m. 20 October 1759 Vincent John Biscoe, of Hookwood (1721 – 29 April 1770)

The 8th Duke of Somerset died between 12 and 15 December 1757, and was buried at Maiden Bradley on 21 December 1757.

== Ancestry ==
Ancestors of Edward Seymour, 8th Duke of Somerset

Sir Edward Seymour, 2nd Baronet
Sir Edward Seymour, 3rd Baronet
Dorothy Killegrew
Sir Edward Seymour, 4th Baronet
Sir John Portman, 1st Baronet
Anne Portman
Anne Gifford
Sir Edward Seymour, 5th Baronet
Sir William Wale
Margaret Wale
Edward Seymour, 8th Duke of Somerset
Sir Francis Popham
Alexander Popham
Anne Gardiner Dudley
Sir Francis Popham
William Carre
Letitia Carre
Laetitia Popham
Helena/Eleanor Rogers

Parliament of Great Britain
Preceded by Peter Bathurst; Henry Hoare	Member of Parliament for Salisbury; 1741–1747; With: Sir Jacob Bouverie	Succeeded by Hon. William Bouverie; Edward Poore
Legal offices
Preceded by The Earl of Cardigan	Justice in Eyre north of the Trent; 1752–1757	Succeeded by The Lord Edgcumbe
Peerage of England
Preceded by Algernon Seymour	Duke of Somerset; 1750–1757	Succeeded by Edward Seymour
Baronetage of England
Preceded by Edward Seymour	Baronet (of Berry Pomeroy); 1740–1757	Succeeded by Edward Seymour
