= West Looe (constituency) =

Former parliamentary constituency in the United Kingdom

- Former borough constituency for the House of Commons
- County: Cornwall
- Major settlements: West Looe

1535–1832
- Seats: Two
- Replaced by: East Cornwall

West Looe, often spelt Westlow or alternative Westlowe, in Cornwall, England, was a rotten borough represented in the House of Commons of England from 1535 to 1707, in the House of Commons of Great Britain from 1707 to 1800, and in the House of Commons of the United Kingdom from 1801 to 1832. It elected two Members of Parliament (MP) by the bloc vote system of election. It was disfranchised in the Reform Act 1832.

== History ==
West Looe was one of a number of Cornish boroughs enfranchised in the Tudor period, and like almost all of them it was a rotten borough from the start, with the size and importance of the community that comprised it quite inadequate to justify its representation. The borough consisted of the town of West Looe in Cornwall, connected by bridge across the River Looe to East Looe, which was also a parliamentary borough. From the reign of Edward VI, West Looe and East Looe were jointly a borough, returning two members of Parliament; however, under Queen Elizabeth the two towns were separated, and each thereafter returned two members except between 1654 and 1658, when they were once again represented jointly as East Looe and West Looe, by one member of the First and Second Protectorate Parliaments. At this early period, West Looe was sometimes alternatively referred to as Portby or Portpigham.

=== Franchise ===
In 1660, the Commons had resolved that "the right of election is in the freemen and inhabitants paying scot and lot". But this determination proved to be ambiguous. It was presumably intended to secure the vote to the inhabitants whether or not they were freemen, but it was quickly re-interpreted as restricting the vote to those who were both freemen and residents. This arrangement was eventually formalised into a franchise held by the Mayor and members of the Corporation, providing they lived in the town. This corporation, which seems to have been set up for the purpose, consisted of 12 "capital burgesses" and an indefinite number of "free burgesses". The free burgesses were appointed by the corporation and tended to be few in number; furthermore, a small number of prominent local families provided the majority of both the corporation and the free burgesses. There were just 12 registered electors in 1816, and 19 in 1831.

In practice, this meant that the power to choose the MPs was in the hands of the local landowner or "proprietor", making West Looe (like East Looe) one of the most notorious of the rotten boroughs. For many years at the time of the Reform Act, West Looe had been controlled by the local gentry families of first the Trelawneys and later the Bullers of nearby Morval (which also controlled East Looe and Saltash), and many members of the Buller family sat for the borough in the House of Commons; nevertheless, they generally assuaged local feelings by allowing other local families some influence over one of the two seats.

=== Elections ===
Elections at West Looe were almost always uncontested. There was not one contest at a general election between 1700 and 1832, although a by-election in 1765 was fought out when an alliance of local families clearly felt they had enough sway on the corporation to challenge the Buller domination; the Buller candidate won.

Their uncontested nature did not guarantee that elections ran smoothly. West Looe waited only until its second Parliament to have its first controversial election, choosing Dr Alexander Nowell, a Prebendary of Westminster, as one of its members in the second Parliament of 1553. At this stage the eligibility or otherwise of clergy to sit in the Commons was not established, and a committee of six was appointed to consider the case on 12 October 1553. The following day it reported that, since his ecclesiastical rank entitled him to a vote in Convocation, he could not sit in the House of Commons. A writ to elect a new member in his place was ordered, though there is no record that such an election was ever made. Nowell's case became established precedent as to the eligibility of similar candidates in future places. (The situation was not finally clarified until clergy were declared ineligible by statute early in the 19th century.)

Nearly two centuries later, West Looe was again found to have elected an ineligible candidate when it chose Edward Trelawny in 1734, who was a Commissioner of Customs at the time.

=== Abolition ===
In 1831, when commissioners were collecting the statistics on which the Reform Act was founded, West Looe had a population of 593 and 126 houses; the borough and town were coterminous, giving no scope for expanding the boundaries to save it from disfranchisement. The borough was abolished by the Reform Act 1832, its voters being absorbed into the new Eastern Cornwall county division, which had its place of election at Bodmin.

== Members of Parliament ==
=== 1553–1629 ===
Parliament	First member	Second member
First Parliament of 1553	John Ashley	William Morice
Second Parliament of 1553	Dr Alexander Nowell	Ralph Clive
Parliament of 1554	William Bendlowes (?)	Robert Monson (?)
Parliament of 1554–1555	Clement Higham	Ambrose Gilbert
Parliament of 1555	William St Aubyn	John St Clair
Parliament of 1558		Oliver Becket
Parliament of 1559	John More	William Pole
Parliament of 1563–1567	John Fowler	John Young
Parliament of 1571	Clement Throckmorton	John Fineux
Parliament of 1572–1581	John Audley	William Hammond
Parliament of 1584–1585	Thomas Lancaster	Geoffrey Gates
Parliament of 1586–1587	Richard Champernowne	John Hammond
Parliament of 1588–1589	Matthew Patteson	Robert Sanderson
Parliament of 1593	John Shelbury	Hugh Beeston
Parliament of 1597–1598	Robert Hitcham	Sir Henry Lennard
Parliament of 1601	John Hare	Richard Verney
Parliament of 1604–1611	Sir George Harvey, replaced after his death by Sir William Wade	Sir Henry Goodyer
Addled Parliament (1614)	Sir Edward Lewknor	John Harris
Parliament of 1621–1622	Heneage Finch	Christopher Harris
Happy Parliament (1624–1625)	George Mynn	James Bagg
Useless Parliament (1625)	John Wolstenholme	Edward Thomas
Parliament of 1625–1626	John Wolstenholme	John Rudhale
Parliament of 1628–1629	John Parker	Edward Thomas
No Parliament summoned 1629–1640

=== 1640–1832 ===
Year	First member	First party	Second member	Second party
April 1640	Anthony Mildmay		George Potter	
November 1640	Henry Killigrew	Royalist	Thomas Arundell	Parliamentarian
January 1644	Killigrew disabled to sit – seat vacant		Thomas Arundell	Parliamentarian
1647	John Arundell		Thomas Arundell	Parliamentarian
November 1648	John Arundell		Thomas Arundell died – seat left vacant	
December 1648	John Arundell excluded in Pride's Purge – seat vacant		Thomas Arundell died – seat left vacant	
1653	West Looe was unrepresented in the Barebones Parliament			
1654	John Blackmore		East Looe and West Looe jointly elected a single member to the First and Second Parliaments of the Protectorate	
1656	John Buller		East Looe and West Looe jointly elected a single member to the First and Second Parliaments of the Protectorate	
January 1659	Dr William Petty		William Whitelock	
May 1659	Not represented in the restored Rump			
April 1660	John Buller		John Kendall	
April 1661	John Trelawny		John Nicholas	
June 1661	John Trelawny		Sir Henry Vernon	
1677	John Trelawny		John Trelawny	
1680	John Trelawny		Jonathan Trelawny	
1685	James Kendall		Henry Trelawny	
1689	James Kendall		Percy Kirke	
1690	Edward Seymour	Tory	Jonathan Trelawny	
1695	James Kendall		John Mountstephen	
1701	James Kendall		The Earl of Ranelagh	
July 1702	Sidney Godolphin		The Earl of Ranelagh	
December 1702	Richard Hele		The Earl of Ranelagh	
1703	Charles Seymour		Henry Poley	
1705	Sir Charles Hedges	Tory	John Mountstephen	
1707	Sir Charles Hedges	Tory	Francis Palmes	
1708	Sir Charles Hedges	Tory	John Conyers	
1710	Sir Charles Hedges	Tory	Arthur Maynwaring	
April 1713	Sir Charles Hedges	Tory	John Trelawny	
September 1713	Rear Admiral Sir Charles Wager		John Trelawny	
1715	Rear Admiral George Delaval		Thomas Maynard	
1722	Rear Admiral George Delaval		Sir John Trelawny	
1724	Edward Trelawny		Sir John Trelawny	
1727	Edward Trelawny		John Willes	
1733	Thomas Walker		John Willes	
1734	Edward Trelawny		John Willes	
1735	John Owen		John Willes	
1737	John Owen		John Strange	
1741	Benjamin Keene		Admiral Sir Charles Wager	Whig
1743	Benjamin Keene		John Frederick	
1747	William Noel		John Frederick	
1757	William Trelawny		John Frederick	
1761	William Trelawny		Francis Buller	
1765	William Trelawny		John Sargent	
1767	James Townsend	Whig	John Sargent	
1768	James Townsend	Whig	William Graves	
1774	Sir William James		Charles Ogilvie	
1775	Sir William James		John Rogers	
1780	Sir William James		John Buller I	
1782	Sir William James		John Cocks	
January 1784	John Buller I		John Cocks	
April 1784	John Scott		John Lemon	
August 1784	John Scott		James Adams	
1790	Sir John de la Pole		John Pardoe	
May 1796	Sitwell Sitwell		John Buller II	
November 1796	Sitwell Sitwell		John Hookham Frere	
1802	James Buller II		Thomas Smith	
1803	James Buller II		Quintin Dick	
1805	Ralph Daniell		Quintin Dick	
1806	Ralph Daniell		James Buller II	
January 1812	Ralph Daniell		Sir Joseph Yorke	
October 1812	Charles Buller I	Whig	Anthony Buller	Whig
1816	Sir Charles Hulse	Tory	Hon. Henry Fitzgerald-de Ros	Tory
1818	Sir Charles Hulse	Tory	Henry Goulburn	Tory
1826	Charles Buller I	Whig	John Buller II	Whig
1827	Charles Buller I	Whig	Sir Charles Hulse	Tory
1830	Charles Buller II	Whig	Sir Charles Hulse	Tory
1831	Sir Anthony Buller	Whig	Sir Charles Hulse	Tory
1832	Constituency abolished			

== Elections ==
General election 1754: West Looe (2 seats)
Party	Candidate	Votes	%	±%
Nonpartisan	John Frederick	Unopposed	N/A	N/A
Nonpartisan	William Noel	Unopposed	N/A	N/A

By-election, 1765: West Looe
Party	Candidate	Votes	%	±%
Nonpartisan	John Sargent	23	N/A	N/A
Nonpartisan	James Townsend	Unknown	N/A	N/A

Note: It is known that Townsend claimed 42 votes and that "the greater part" of these were declared invalid by the Returning Officer, but beyond the fact that his final total must have been lower than Sargent's the figure is not determinable

== See also ==
- East Looe (UK Parliament constituency)
- Unreformed House of Commons
