= James Kendall (politician) =

English politician, businessman, and military officer

James Kendall (17 June 1647 – 10 July 1708) of Birdcage Walk, Westminster and Carshalton, Surrey was an English Army officer and Tory and later Whig politician who sat in the English and British House of Commons between 1685 and 1708. He served as Governor of Barbados from 1689 to 1693.

== Early life ==
Kendall was baptized on 17 June 1647, the fourth, but third surviving son of Thomas Kendall of Lostwithiel, Cornwall and his wife Elizabeth Arscott, daughter of Arthur Arscott of Tetcott, Devon. He was admitted at Middle Temple and Lincoln's Inn on 28 December 1666. He joined the army and was a cornet in the Royal Horse Guards in 1675. From 1678 to 1679 he was a lieutenant colonel in Lord Morpeth's regiment of foot and from 1680 to 1687 a captain in the Coldstream Guards.

== Career ==
Kendall was returned as Tory Member of Parliament for West Looe at the 1685 English general election. He was appointed Governor of Barbados in 1689 until 1693, and a member of the council from 1694 to 1695. He returned to England and was returned as MP for West Looe again at the 1695 English general election on the interest of his niece Mary Kendall. From 1696 to 1699, he was a Lord of the Admiralty. He was returned again at the 1698 English general election and at the two general elections of 1701, but when he fell out with his niece, he was dropped at the 1702 English general election. He thereupon disinherited her.

At the 1705 English general election, Kendall stood in a contest at Lostwithiel on the interest of his relative Canon Nicholas Kendall. He was defeated in the poll, but petitioned and was seated as MP for Lostwithiel on 17 January 1706. By this time he was listed as a Whig. He was returned for Lostwithiel at the 1708 British general election.

== Death and legacy ==
Kendall died of apoplexy at Carshalton on 10 July 1708 and was buried in south choir aisle of Westminster Abbey on 16 July. When he died the contemporary annalist recorded of him that he was very "rich". His niece, and heir at law, Mary Kendall, was also buried in there, in the Chapel of St John the Baptist. His estate, which included Kendall Plantation in Barbados, was worth £40,000, but he left nothing to his niece and heir at law. He left it, instead, to his mistress, Walker Colleton, daughter of Colonel Thomas Colleton. They had met in Barbados and he had an illegitimate son by her. His family was Cornish, being related to the Kendalls of Pelyn, near Lostwithiel, who for many generations past had been active in the politics of Cornwall and England. In 1866 it was suggested by antiquarian Evelyn Shirley that the family had "perhaps sent more members to the British Parliament than any other in the United Kingdom."

Parliament of England
Preceded by John Trelawny; Jonathan Trelawny	Member of Parliament for West Looe; 1685–1690; With: Henry Trelawny 1685-1689; Percy Kirke 1689-1690	Succeeded by Edward Seymour; Jonathan Trelawny
Preceded by Edward Seymour; Jonathan Trelawny	Member of Parliament for West Looe; 1695–1702; With: John Mountstephen 1695-1701; The Earl of Ranelagh 1701-1702	Succeeded by Sidney Godolphin; The Earl of Ranelagh
Preceded by Robert Molesworth; Russell Robartes	Member of Parliament for Lostwithiel; 1706 –1707; With: Russell Robartes	Succeeded by Parliament of Great Britain
Parliament of Great Britain
Preceded by Parliament of England	Member of Parliament for Lostwithiel; 1707–1708; With: Russell Robartes 1707-1708; Joseph Addison 1708	Succeeded by Francis Robartes; Russell Robartes
Government offices
Preceded by Edwyn Stede, acting	Governor of Barbados; 1690–1694	Succeeded by Francis Russell
