= Dohrmann =

Dohrmann is a surname. Notable people with the surname include:

- Angela Dohrmann (born 1965), American actress and television personality
- Elsie Dohrmann (1875–1909), New Zealand educator and activist
- George Dohrmann (born 1973), writer for Sports Illustrated, author of Play Their Hearts Out and winner of the Pulitzer Prize
- Helge Dohrmann (1939–1989), Danish politician

== See also ==
- Dorman
- Dohrmann's, originally Parmelee-Dohrmann, a china, crystal and silver store with stores in Los Angeles and San Francisco
