= Webb Seymour, 10th Duke of Somerset =

British peer and politician

- Tenure: 2 January 1792 – 15 December 1793
- Predecessor: Edward Seymour, 9th Duke of Somerset
- Successor: Edward St Maur, 11th Duke of Somerset
- Born: 3 December 1718
- Died: 15 December 1793 (aged 75)
- Spouse: Anna Maria Bonnell (m. 1769)
- Issue: Edward Seymour; Webb Seymour; Edward St Maur, 11th Duke of Somerset; Lord John Webb Seymour
- Father: Edward Seymour
- Mother: Mary Webb

Webb Seymour, 10th Duke of Somerset (3 December 1718 – 15 December 1793) was a British peer. He was Duke of Somerset from 2 January 1792 until his death.

== Family ==
Webb Seymour was the son of Edward Seymour, 8th Duke of Somerset and his wife, the former Mary Webb. He was also a baronet. He was baptized on 4 December 1718 at Easton, Wiltshire. He inherited his titles from his brother Edward Seymour, 9th Duke of Somerset, in 1792.

== Marriage and progeny ==
In London on 11 or 15 December 1769, he married Anna Maria or Mary Anne Bonnell (d. London, Upper Grosvenor Street, 23 July 1802), daughter of John Bonnell, of Stanton Harcourt, Oxfordshire (baptized St. Dunstan's, 2 July 1689 – interred Stanton Harcourt, Oxfordshire, 28 November 1757), the son of Andrew Bonnell, a merchant from London, and had four sons:

- Edward Seymour (22 April 1771, bap. Monkton Farleigh, Wiltshire, 20 May 1771 – an infant, interred 4 February 1774)
- Webb Seymour (Monkton Farleigh, Wiltshire, 11 May 1772, bap. Monkton Farleigh, Wiltshire, 8 June 1772 – an infant, interred Monkton Farley, Wiltshire, 4 February 1774)
- Edward St. Maur, 11th Duke of Somerset (1775 – 1855)
- Lord John Webb Seymour (7 February 1777 – 15 April 1819), Fellow of the Royal Society, unmarried and without issue

== Death ==
Webb Seymour died in Maiden Bradley, near Warminster, Wiltshire, on 24 December 1793, and was buried there.

== Ancestry ==
Ancestors of Webb Seymour, 10th Duke of Somerset

Sir Edward Seymour, 3rd Baronet
Sir Edward Seymour, 4th Baronet
Anne Portman
Sir Edward Seymour, 5th Baronet
Sir William Wale
Margaret Wale
Edward Seymour, 8th Duke of Somerset
Laetitia Popham
Webb Seymour, 10th Duke of Somerset
Alexander Popham
Sir Francis Popham
Letitia Carre
Daniel Webb
Helena/Eleanor Rogers
Mary Webb
John Somner
Elizabeth Somner

Peerage of England
Preceded by Edward Seymour	Duke of Somerset; 1792–1793	Succeeded by Edward Seymour
