= Lord Webb Seymour =

Lord Webb John Seymour FRS FSA Scot FRSE FLS FGS (7 February 1777 – 15 April 1819) was an English aristocrat and amateur geologist.

== Life ==
John Webb Seymour was the fourth son of Webb Seymour, 10th Duke of Somerset and Mary Anne, Duchess of Somerset (née Bonnell).

He was educated at Edward Meyrick's school in Ramsbury. In 1793 his brother Edward Adolphus Seymour became the 11th Duke. On 29 January 1794 Webb John Seymour matriculated at Christ Church, Oxford and on 15 December 1797 graduated there M.A. At Oxford he was interested in anatomy and, especially, chemistry. In his rooms, he set up a chemical laboratory. After graduation, he went to Edinburgh and became friends with Francis Horner, the philosopher Thomas Brown and John Playfair. Seymour took trips with Playfair on a number of occasions studying the geology of Scotland and a few times in England. Seymour also learned mathematics from Playfair and studied political economy as well as Bacon's De Augmentis Scientiarum and Novum Organum.

In 1799, he was elected a Fellow of the Royal Society of Edinburgh. His proposers were Sir James Hall, 4th Baronet, Andrew Duncan, the elder, and Robert Kennedy. He served as Vice President to the Society 1802 to 1805. In 1802 he was elected a Fellow of the Royal Society of London.

Upon the threat of Napoleonic invasion of England, Seymour from 1803–5 took command of a company of volunteers in Devonshire.

In 1805 he returned to Edinburgh and settled there with his brother at 2 Abercromby Place until the end of his life, with occasional trips to England. He published a few pages on geology but nothing else.

He died at Abercromby Place on 15 April 1819, and (due to his position and influence) was buried in the Royal Chapel at Holyrood Abbey next to Holyrood Palace.

He was unmarried and had no children.

== Artistic recognition ==
His cameo by John Henning is held by the Scottish National Portrait Gallery.

== Selected publications ==
- with John Playfair: An account of observations made by Lord Webb Seymour and Professor Playfair, upon some geological appearances in Glen Tilt and the adjacent country: From the Trans. of the Royal Society of Edinburgh. 1814.
- Correspondence of Two Brothers with Edward Adolphus Webb
