= Sir Henry Hoghton, 5th Baronet =

British politician

Sir Henry Hoghton, 5th Baronet (c.1678–1768) of Hoghton Tower, Lancashire was a British politician who sat in the House of Commons between 1710 and 1741. He had strong dissenting religious views which sustained his militancy against the Jacobite rebellions.

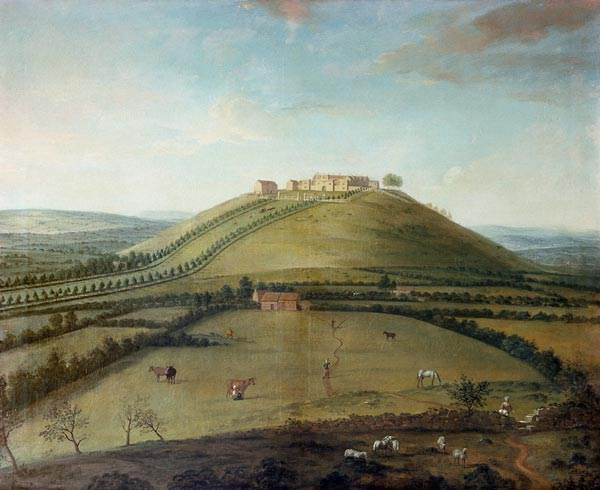
Hoghton Tower, Lancashire - the Hoghton family seat

Hoghton was the second, but eldest surviving son of Sir Charles Hoghton, 4th Baronet and his wife Mary Skeffington, daughter of John Skeffington, 2nd Viscount Masserene. The family had a strong non-conformist tradition, to which he adhered and went on to found many dissenting chapels. In 1695 he was admitted at Middle Temple. He succeeded to the baronetcy and estates on the death of his father on 10 June 1710.

Hoghton became a Freeman of Preston in 1682 and a burgess of Wigan in 1710. He was Deputy Lieutenant of Lancashire and Colonel of the militia. At the 1710 general election he was elected Whig Member of Parliament for Preston, but lost the seat in 1713. He was returned unopposed for Preston at the 1715 general election.

During the Jacobite rebellion Hoghton was active in attending to the defence of the county. His house in Preston was occupied by both sides during the conflict. In the aftermath, he was appointed in 1716 as one of the Commissioners for forfeited estates. At the 1722 general election he stood for Lancashire instead of Preston, but was defeated. After an unsuccessful attempt at Kingston-upon-Hull in 1724 he was brought in by the government as MP for East Looe at a by-election on 17 February 1724. He was returned unopposed at Preston at the 1727 general election and again in 1734. In 1734 he was appointed judge-advocate-general by Walpole. He was defeated at Preston at the 1741 general election and resigned his post.

At the time of the 45 rebellion he was ready to defend the county but had insufficient resources and took refuge in Yorkshire. As a magistrate after the rebellion he applied the law against Roman Catholics very severely. He was castigated by the government, had his decisions put aside, and threatened with removal from the bench.

Hoghton died on 23 February 1768 at the age of 91. He had married three times. Firstly he married Mary Boughton (with £5,000) daughter of Sir William Boughton, 4th Baronet in October 1710. She died in 1720 and he married secondly Lady Elizabeth Russell, widow of Lord. James Russell and daughter of Richard Lloyd, mercer, of London on 14 April 1721, She died in 1736 and he married thirdly Susanna Butterworth (with £8,000), daughter of Thomas Butterworth of Manchester, Lancashire

He had no children by any of his three marriages and the baronetcy passed his nephew, also Henry.

Parliament of Great Britain
Preceded by Henry Fleetwood; Arthur Maynwaring	Member of Parliament for Preston; 1710–1713; With: Henry Fleetwood	Succeeded by Henry Fleetwood; Edward Southwell
Preceded by Henry Fleetwood; Edward Southwell	Member of Parliament for Preston; 1715–1722; With: Henry Fleetwood	Succeeded by Daniel Pulteney; Thomas Hesketh
Preceded by Viscount Malpas; William Lowndes	Member of Parliament for East Looe; 1724–1727; With: Viscount Malpas	Succeeded by Charles Longueville; Sir John Trelawny
Preceded by Daniel Pulteney; Thomas Hesketh	Member of Parliament for Preston; 1727–1741; With: Daniel Pulteney 1727-1732; Nicholas Fazackerley 1732-1741	Succeeded by Nicholas Fazackerley; James Shuttleworth
Baronetage of England
Preceded by Charles Hoghton	Baronet (of Hoghton Tower); 1710-1768	Succeeded by Henry Hoghton
