= Henry Fleetwood (Preston MP) =

English soldier and Tory politician

Member of Parliament for Preston
- In office 1708–1722 Serving with: Arthur Maynwaring (to 1710); Sir Henry Hoghton, 5th Bt (1710–1713; 1715–1722); Edward Southwell (1713–1715)
- Preceded by: Arthur Maynwaring
- Succeeded by: Thomas Hesketh

Personal details
- Born: c. 1667
- Died: 22 May 1746
- Party: Tory
- Education: Brasenose College, Oxford
- Occupation: Soldier, Politician

Military service
- Rank: Lieutenant (English Army)
- Battles/wars: N/A

Henry Fleetwood (c. 1667 – 22 May 1746) of Penwortham, near Preston, Lancashire, was an English soldier and Tory politician who sat in the House of Commons from 1708 to 1722.

== Early life ==
Fleetwood was the eldest son of Arthur Fleetwood of Lichfield, Staffordshire and St Margaret's, Westminster, and his wife Mary Archbold, daughter of Sir Henry Archbold of Abbots Bromley, Staffordshire, chancellor of Lichfield diocese. His father was secretary to the Earl of Danby. He was a cousin of Sir Christopher Musgrave, 5th Baronet. He matriculated at Brasenose College, Oxford on 25 October 1683, aged 16, but in 1685 he joined the English Army. He was an Ensign in the 7th Foot, and rose to second lieutenant in 1687, and lieutenant in 1688. In 1704 he inherited estates, including Penwortham Priory, from his cousin Edward Fleetwood MP.

== Career ==
Fleetwood stood unsuccessfully for Preston at a by election on 27 December 1706. He was returned unopposed as Tory Member of Parliament for Preston at the 1708 British general election. He voted against the impeachment of Dr Sacheverell in 1710. At the 1710 British general election, he was returned unopposed again as a Tory at Preston with the support of the Duke and Duchess of Hamilton. He was a teller on the Tory side, and was listed as one of the ‘Tory patriots’ who opposed to the war and a ‘worthy patriot’ who detected the mismanagements of the previous administration. He voted for the French commerce bill on 18 June 1713. After assiduously canvassing his electorate, he was returned at the head of the poll for Preston in a contest at the 1713 British general election but made little impression in Parliament.

Fleetwood married Sarah Sudell, the daughter of Roger Sudell of Preston, Lancashire by a settlement dated 12 February 1714.

At the 1715 British general election, Fleetwood was returned again as Tory MP for Preston. His only known vote was in 1719 against the repeal of the Occasional Conformity and Schism Acts. He did not stand at the 1722 British general election. He was an active member of the mock corporation of Walton-le-Dale for the next twenty years.

== Death and legacy ==
Fleetwood died without issue on 22 May 1746, leaving debts of £16,000. His estates were sold to John Aspinall to pay his debts, after an Act of Parliament in 1748.

Parliament of Great Britain
Preceded by Arthur Maynwaring; Francis Annesley	Member of Parliament for Preston; 1708–1722; With: Arthur Maynwaring to 1710; Sir Henry Hoghton, Bt 1710–13; Edward Southwell 1713–15; Sir Henry Hoghton, Bt 1715–22	Succeeded by Thomas Hesketh; Daniel Pulteney
