= William Morice (died 1554) =

English politician

William Morice (c. 1500 – 17 January 1554) was an English politician.

He was a Member (MP) of the Parliament of England for Downton in 1547, West Looe in March 1553 and Liskeard in October 1553. He was married by 1539 to Anne, sister of Edward Isaac of Well, Kent.

Marion Colthorpe, in Women at Court: Royal Household identifies Anne Isaac, daughter of Mr. Isaac and Margery Wroth (d.1540), as the Mrs. Morice or Morris who was Mother of the Maids in the household of Elizabeth I from January 1559 until 1560/1. And whose husband was William Morice of Chipping Ongar, Essex and London, Gentleman Usher from 1533 until his death in 1552/4. They had two sons and one daughter. Their son James (1539–1597), like his father, was a Member of Parliament. William Morice and his brother-in-law Edward Isaac of Well, Kent, were active in promoting the New Religion. Morice left all his goods to his wife. According to the History of Parliament entry for Morice, the Privy Council ordered an examination of Anne Morice and the inhabitants of Ongar on 7 June 1554 “that without authority of their own heads attempted lately to pluck down the church walls there.”
