= Edward Isaac =

English Protestant Marian exile

Edward Isaac was an influential 16th-century English Protestant and Marian exile. He was a lay supporter of John Bland. He resided at Well Court in Ickham and Well, Kent.

Isaac helped Edwin Sandys leave England, sending his son to accompany him to Antwerp. Mary I of England arranged for eleven of the exiles to be arrested for sedition, including Isaac. Isaac himself left for Strasburg, where he was one of the group opposed to John Knox.
