= Charles Hulse =

British Member of Parliament (1771–1854)

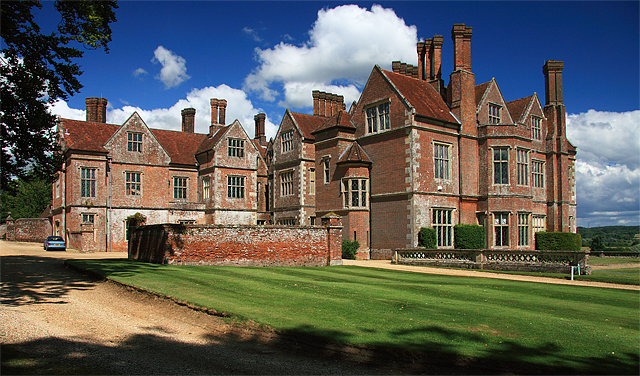
Breamore House, the Hulse family seat

Sir Charles Hulse, 4th Baronet (12 October 1771 – 25 October 1854) was a British Member of Parliament.

He was the eldest surviving son of Sir Edward Hulse, 3rd Baronet of Breamore House, Breamore, Hampshire, and was educated at Eton College (1782–1789) and Christ Church, Oxford (1790), after which he studied law at Lincoln's Inn.

He was commissioned as Captain of the Fordingbridge Yeomanry Cavalry in 1798, and was re-appointed in 1803 when the Volunteers were re-raised after the breakdown of the Peace of Amiens. He was promoted to Lieutenant-Colonel in 1812 to command the South-East Hampshire Local Militia.

He succeeded his father to the baronetcy and to Breamore House on 30 September 1816.

He was MP for West Looe 11 March 1816 – 1826 and 6 April 1827 – 1832.

He married Maria, the daughter of John Buller of Morval, Cornwall, in 1808; they had five sons and a daughter. He was succeeded by his son Edward, the 5th baronet.

Coat of arms of Charles Hulse
Crest A buck’s head couped Proper attired Or between the attires a sun of the last and charged on the neck with two bezants and a plate. Escutcheon Per fess Argent and Ermine three piles one issuing from the chief between the others reversed Sable. Motto Esse Quam Videri

Baronetage of Great Britain
Preceded by Edward Hulse	Baronet (of Lincoln's Inn Fields); 1816–1854	Succeeded by Edward Hulse
