= John Marshall (priest) =

John Marshall (or Martiall) (born in Worcestershire, 1534, died at Lille, 3 April 1597) was an English Roman Catholic priest. He was one of the six companions associated with William Allen in the foundation of the English College at Douai, in 1568.

== Life ==
He received his education at Winchester College (1545–49) and New College, Oxford (1549–56), at which latter place, after a residence of seven years, he graduated as bachelor of civil law in 1556. He next accepted a post as assistant master at his old school at Winchester under Thomas Hyde; but soon after the accession of Elizabeth I of England, both of them found it necessary to quit the country.

Marshall retired to Leuven, where a number of English Catholic exiles were residing. Thence he removed to Douai, when he joined the new university recently founded there, and graduated B.D. in 1567. Thus it came about that when Allen arrived to found his new college, Marshall was already in residence, and attached himself to the new foundation. He did not, however, remain long, chiefly because of the smallness of the allowance which it was possible to give; later on, he obtained a canonry in the church of St. Peter at the neighbouring city of Lille. Owing to the disturbed state of the country, he was not installed until 1579. He lived to enjoy his dignity for eighteen years.

He died on 3 April 1597 at Lille, in the arms of his friend William Gifford, and was buried in St. Peter's Church.

== Works ==
It was during his time at Leuven that Marshall brought out the two major works for which he is known. The first of these, Treatise of the Cross (Antwerp, 1564), was a defence of the honour paid by Catholics to the Cross, and he dedicated it to Queen Elizabeth, being "emboldened upon her keeping the image of a crucifix in her chapel". He was attacked by James Calfhill, the Calvinist, and brought forth his Reply (Louvain, 1566). He also wrote a treatise on the Tonsure of Clerks, left in manuscript.
