= Francis Palmes =

Lieutenant-General Francis Palmes
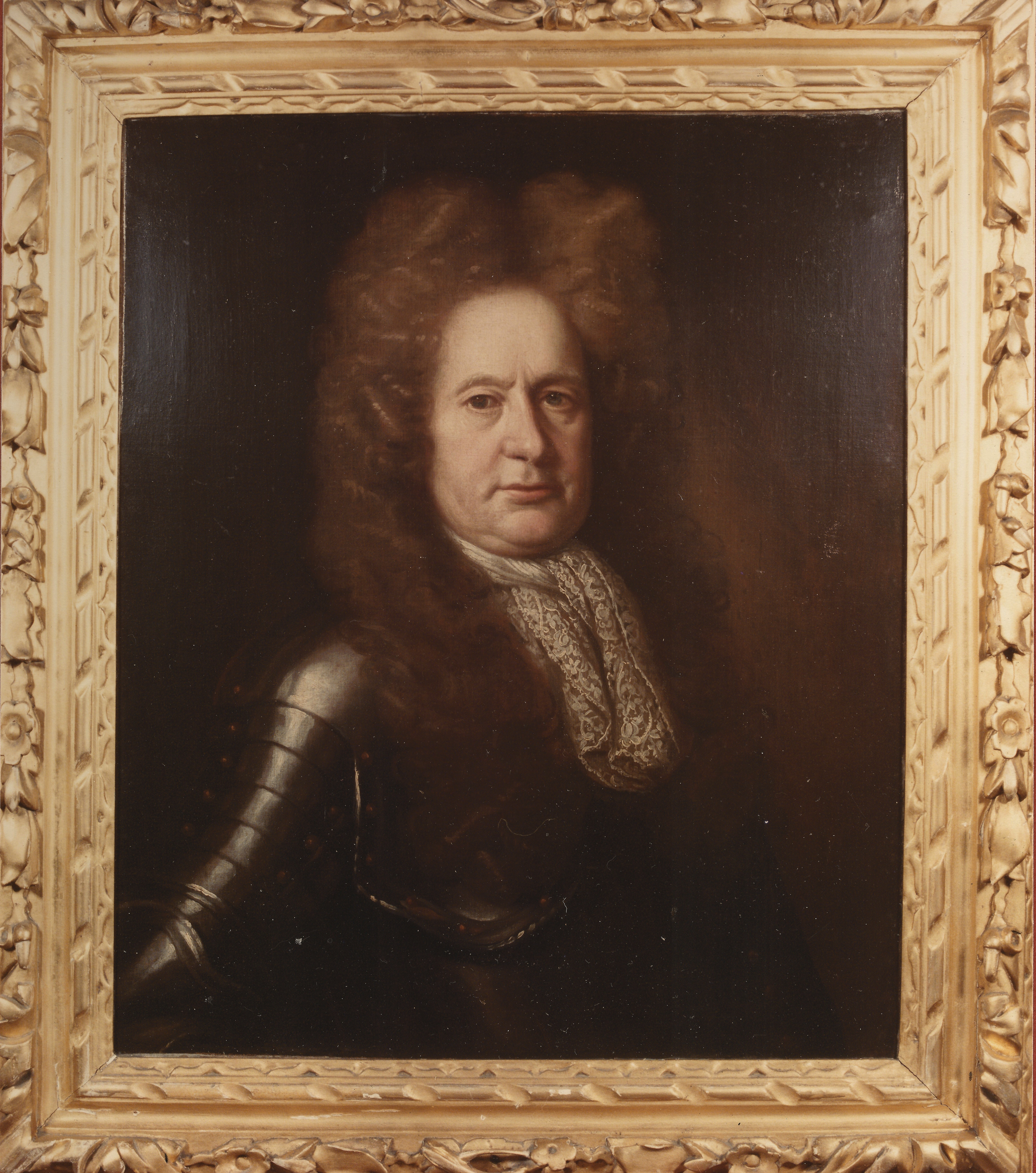
- Portrait by an unknown artist
- Died: 1719
- Military career
- Allegiance: Kingdom of Great Britain
- Branch: British Army
- Rank: Lieutenant-General
- Conflicts: War of the Spanish Succession: Battle of Blenheim

Lieutenant-General Francis Palmes (died 1719) was a noted favourite general of the Duke of Marlborough. He served in Lord Cavendish's Regiment of Horse and Hugh Wyndham's Regiment of Carabiniers, eventually rising to become lieutenant-colonel of the latter regiment. He fought at the Battle of Blenheim in command of a brigade. Often employed as a diplomatic envoy as well as a soldier, Palmes died at Dresden in 1719.

== Early life ==
Palmes was the second son of Francis Palmes of Carcraig and Elizabeth Taylor, daughter of Thomas Taylor of Ballyport, County Limerick. The Palmes family of Carcraig was a cadet branch of the Palmes family of Naburn.

== Military career ==
Palmes began a lengthy military career shortly after the Revolution, being granted a captain's commission in Lord Cavendish's Regiment of Horse on 31 December 1688. He served in Ireland through the 1690s, becoming lieutenant-colonel of Hugh Wyndham's Regiment of Carabiniers on 2 January 1694. He saw service during the War of the Spanish Succession.

The Duke of Marlborough recommended Palmes for appointment to the rank of brigadier-general. On 1 January 1704 he was promoted to this rank, having already been commissioned as a brevet colonel of horse on 1 July 1702. (Note: Marlborough's patronage of a similar note was also received by two other Irishmen, the Earl of Cardogan and Thomas Meredyth in the mid-1700s. Palmes was closely associated with the two. The Duke of Marlborough was accused of practising favouritism on Cadogan, Palmes and Meredith.) Palmes commanded a brigade as well as his regiment at the Battle of Blenheim, Wyndham himself serving in Portugal and being unable to lead the regiment. Reports from the battle state that 'hardly anyone was more instrumental to the success of that day' than Palmes.

A poem from 1707 recognised the close relationship between Palmes and the Duke of Marlborough and stated that Palmes was to marry Marlborough's illegitimate daughter and receive a portion of £10,000. He was promoted to major-general on 1 January 1707 and lieutenant-general on 1 January 1709. He served as colonel of his old regiment the carabineers from 1 October 1707 to 2 April 1712, then serving as colonel of a 'newly raised' regiment of dragoons from 22 July 1715 until his death.

== Political positions ==
Palmes stood at the by-election on 23 January 1707 for West Looe and was successful. He did not stand for re-election in 1708.

== Diplomatic missions ==
From February 1708 Palmes travelled extensively, undertaking mission to the United Provinces, Hanover, Prussia, Vienna and Savoy in order to concert measures with the allies, serving as the envoy to the Duke of Savoy in 1709. He became envoy to Poland in 1718. He died at Dresden on 4 January 1719.
