= Robert Monson =

16th-century English politician and judge

Robert Monson (by 1532 – 23 September 1583) was an English politician and judge. He was Member of Parliament for various constituencies from 1553 to 1572 and also became Justice of the Common Pleas.

== Life ==
He was born the third son of William Monson of South Carlton, Lincolnshire and Elizabeth, daughter of Sir Robert Tyrwhitt of Kettelby. He was educated at Cambridge University before entering Lincoln's Inn, on 23 January 1545 – 1546, and was called to the bar on 2 February 1549 – 1550.

He entered politics in 1553 when elected Member of Parliament for Launceston, followed by election for West Looe, Cornwall (April 1554), Newport, Cornwall (November, 1554 and 1555), Launceston again (1558), his home county town of Lincoln in 1563 and 1571 and finally Totnes, Devon in 1572.

In 1572 he was made a Serjeant-at-law and appointed to the bench of Common Pleas. Monson was a member of a special commission, appointed 11 May 1575, for the examination of suspected anabaptists. Most of the heretics recanted, but two Dutchmen, John Peters, and Henry Turnwert, stood firm, and on 22 July were burned at West Smithfield. In December 1577, Monson gave an extrajudicial opinion in favour of the legality of punishing non-attendance at church by fine.

For questioning the legality of the sentence passed on John Stubbs for his pamphlet against the French match he was committed to the Fleet in November 1579. He was released in the following February, and had leave to go down into Lincolnshire; nor did he ever resume his seat on the bench, though fines continue to be recorded as levied before him until the middle of Easter term, when he formally resigned. His successor, William Peryam, however, was not appointed until February 1580–81.

Monson spent the rest of his days on his estate in Lincolnshire, where he died on 23 September 1583. He was buried in Lincoln Cathedral, his tomb being marked by a brass with a quaint Latin inscription.

== Family ==
He married Elizabeth, daughter and heiress of Sir John Dyon of Tathwell, Lincolnshire; they had no children.
