= Sir Edward Seymour, 5th Baronet =

English politician

Sir Edward Seymour, of Berry Pomeroy, 5th Baronet (1660 or 1663 – 29 December 1740) of Bradley House, Maiden Bradley, Wiltshire was an English landowner and Tory politician.

== Early life ==
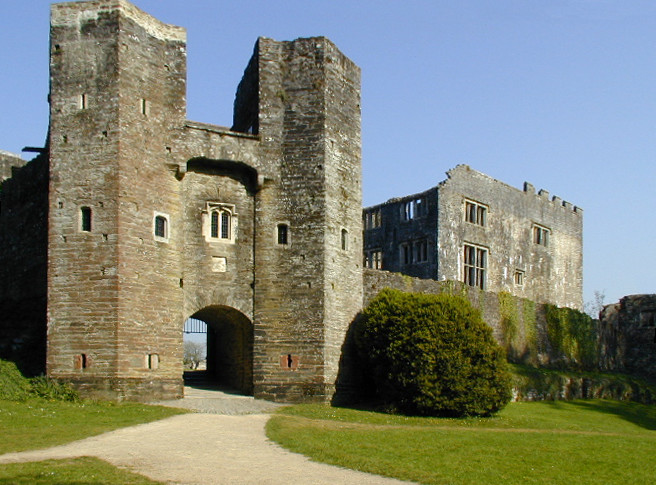
Pomeroy Castle and the ruins of the old house

Seymour was baptized on 18 December 1663, the eldest son of the Royalist and Tory politician Sir Edward Seymour, 4th Baronet and his first wife, Margaret Wale. He matriculated at Christ Church, Oxford in 1679. He married his cousin Laetitia Popham, the daughter of Sir Francis Popham, of Littlecote, Wiltshire, and his wife Eleanor Rogers, on 11 August 1685. She was also the niece of his stepmother, also named Letitia Popham, who died in 1714.

== Career ==
At the 1690 English general election, Seymour was returned as Member of Parliament for West Looe. He stood down at the 1695 English general election.

Seymour succeeded his father on 17 February 1708 to the baronetcy and the huge original Bradley House in Wiltshire. At the 1708 British general election, he stood on his own interest as Tory MP for Totnes. He made little impression, but voted against the impeachment of Dr Sacheverell. At the 1710 British general election, he was returned as MP for Great Bedwyn with Lord Bruce. He was listed as a ‘worthy patriot’ who helped to detect the mismanagements of the previous administration, but developed reservations about the Tory administration of Harley. He was returned again at the 1713 British general election, but did not stand in 1715.

Seymour completed Bradley House in 1710, which enabled the family to leave their crumbling seat at Berry Pomeroy Castle in Devon. He also acquired and rebuilt Rumwell Hall at Bishop's Hull, Somerset in 1733.

== Death and legacy ==
Seymour died on 29 December 1740. By his wife he had twelve children:

- Edward Seymour, 8th Duke of Somerset (1694–1757)
- Francis Seymour, of Sherborne, Dorset (1697–1761)
- Alexander Seymour (d. 3 April 1731), unmarried
- William Seymour, of East Knoyle, Wiltshire (1713 – 5 January 1746/1747), m. firstly 17 April 1737 Elizabeth Hippye (d. 22 March 1741/1742), daughter of John Hippye, of Frome, Somerset, and wife, m. secondly 2 August 1745 Mary Hyde (d. 8 November 1753), daughter of Samuel Hyde, of Bromley, Kent, and wife, without any issue from both marriages
- Laetitia Seymour, married John Gapper and had issue
- Margaret Seymour, married Richard Jones, of Ramsbury
- Elizabeth Seymour (d. 5 May 1756), married Henry Hungerford, of Field
- Anne Seymour (d. February 1755), married William Scroggs, of Chute Lodge
- Eleanor Seymour (d. bef. 1756?), unmarried
- Mary Seymour, married Rev. Hammond
- Jane Seymour, married William Colman, of Garnhay
- Katherine Seymour, married John Philip Fuhr, of Bristol

His estate passed to his eldest son, Edward, who reunited the two branches of the Seymour family when he inherited the dukedom of Somerset in 1750.

Parliament of England
| Preceded by James Kendall; Percy Kirke | Member of Parliament for West Looe; 1690–1695; With: Jonathan Trelawny | Succeeded by James Kendall; John Mountstephen |
Parliament of Great Britain
| Preceded by Thomas Coulson; Sir Humphrey Mackworth | Member of Parliament for Totnes; 1708–1710; With: George Courtenay | Succeeded by Thomas Coulson; Francis Gwyn |
| Preceded by Lord Bruce; Samuel Vanacker Sambrooke | Member of Parliament for Great Bedwyn; 1710–1715; With: Lord Bruce 1710–1711; Thomas Millington 1711–1715 | Succeeded by Stephen Bisse; William Sloper |
Baronetage of England
| Preceded by Edward Seymour | Baronet (of Berry Pomeroy); 1708–1741 | Succeeded by Edward Seymour |
