= Earl of Northumberland =

Earldom in the Peerage of Great Britain

Earldom of Northumberland later a subsidiary title of the Duke of Northumberland
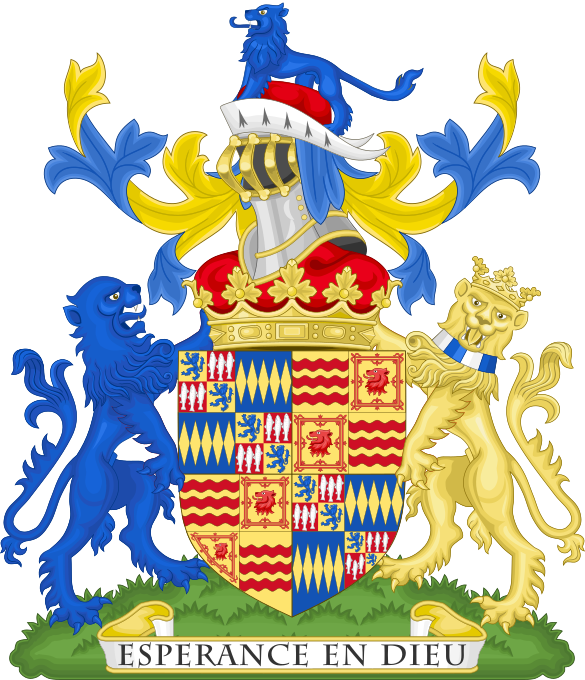
- Arms of Ralph Percy, 12th Duke of Northumberland and 13th Earl of Northumberland (5th creation)
- Creation date: 1377 (1st creation); 1416 (2nd creation); 1464 (3rd creation); 1674 (4th creation); 1749 (5th creation)
- Created by: Richard II (1st creation); Henry V (2nd creation); Henry VI (3rd creation); Edward VI (2nd creation restored); Charles II (4th creation); George II (5th creation)
- Peerage: Peerage of England (1st to 4th creations); Peerage of Great Britain (5th creation)
- First holder: Henry Percy
- Present holder: Ralph Percy, 12th Duke of Northumberland
- Heir apparent: George Percy, Earl Percy
- Status: Fifth creation extant
- Extinction date: 1405 (1st creation); 1461(2nd creation forfeit); 1471 (3rd creation); 1670 (2nd creation extinct); 1683 (4th creation)
- Seats: Alnwick Castle; Syon House; Petworth House

The title of Earl of Northumberland has been created several times in the Peerage of England and of Great Britain, succeeding the title Earl of Northumbria. Its most famous holders are the House of Percy (alias Perci), who were the most powerful noble family in Northern England for much of the Middle Ages. The heirs of the Percys, via a female line, were ultimately made Duke of Northumberland in 1766, and continue to hold the earldom as a subsidiary title.

== History ==
=== Percy family ===
Left: Paternal arms of Henry de Percy, 1st Baron Percy (1273–1314): Azure, five fusils in fess or,("Percy ancient") which he abandoned in favour of right: Or, a lion rampant azure ("Percy modern"/Brabant) Both arms were quartered by the Percy Earls of Northumberland and remain quartered by the present Duke of Northumberland

William de Percy, 1st Baron Percy, was in the train of William I. After arriving in England following the Harrying of the North (1069–70), he was bestowed modest estates in Yorkshire by Hugh d'Avranches. However, by the reign of Henry II the family was represented by only an heiress, Agnes de Percy (died 1203) following the death of the third feudal baron. As her dowry contained the manor of Topcliffe in Yorkshire, Adeliza of Louvain, the widowed and remarried second wife of Henry I, arranged the marriage of Agnes with her own young half-brother, Joscelin of Louvain. After their wedding, the nobleman from the Duchy of Brabant in the Holy Roman Empire settled in England. He adopted the surname Percy and his descendants were later created Earls of Northumberland. The Percys' line would go on to play a large role in the history of both England and Scotland. As nearly every Percy was a Warden of the Marches, Scottish affairs were often of more concern than those in England.

==== 1309: 1st Baron Percy ====
In 1309, Henry de Percy, 1st Baron Percy purchased Alnwick Castle from Antony Bek, Bishop of Durham. The castle had been founded in the late 11th century by Ivo de Vesci, a nobleman from Vassy or Vichy. A descendant of Ivo de Vesci, John de Vesci, succeeded to his father's titles and estates upon his father's death in Gascony in 1253. These included the barony of Alnwick and a large property in Northumberland and considerable estates in Yorkshire, including Malton. Due to being under age, King Henry III of England conferred the wardship of John's estates to a foreign kinsman, which caused great offence to the de Vesci family. The family's property and estates had been put into the guardianship of Bek, who sold them to the Percys. From this time, the fortunes of the Percys, although they still held their Yorkshire lands and titles, were linked permanently with Alnwick and its castle.

==== 1316: 2nd Baron Percy ====
Henry de Percy, 2nd Baron Percy, who was granted the lands of Patrick IV, Earl of March, in Northumberland, by Edward II in 1316, began to improve the size and defences of the castle. He was appointed to Edward III's Council in 1327 and was given the manor and castle of Skipton. He was also granted, by Edward III, the castle and barony of Warkworth in 1328. He was at the siege of Dunbar and the Battle of Halidon Hill and was subsequently appointed constable of Berwick-upon-Tweed. In 1346, Henry commanded the right wing of the English army which defeated a larger Scottish force at the Battle of Neville's Cross near Durham. His son, Henry de Percy, 3rd Baron Percy married Mary of Lancaster, an aunt of John of Gaunt's wife Blanche of Lancaster.

=== 1377 creation ===
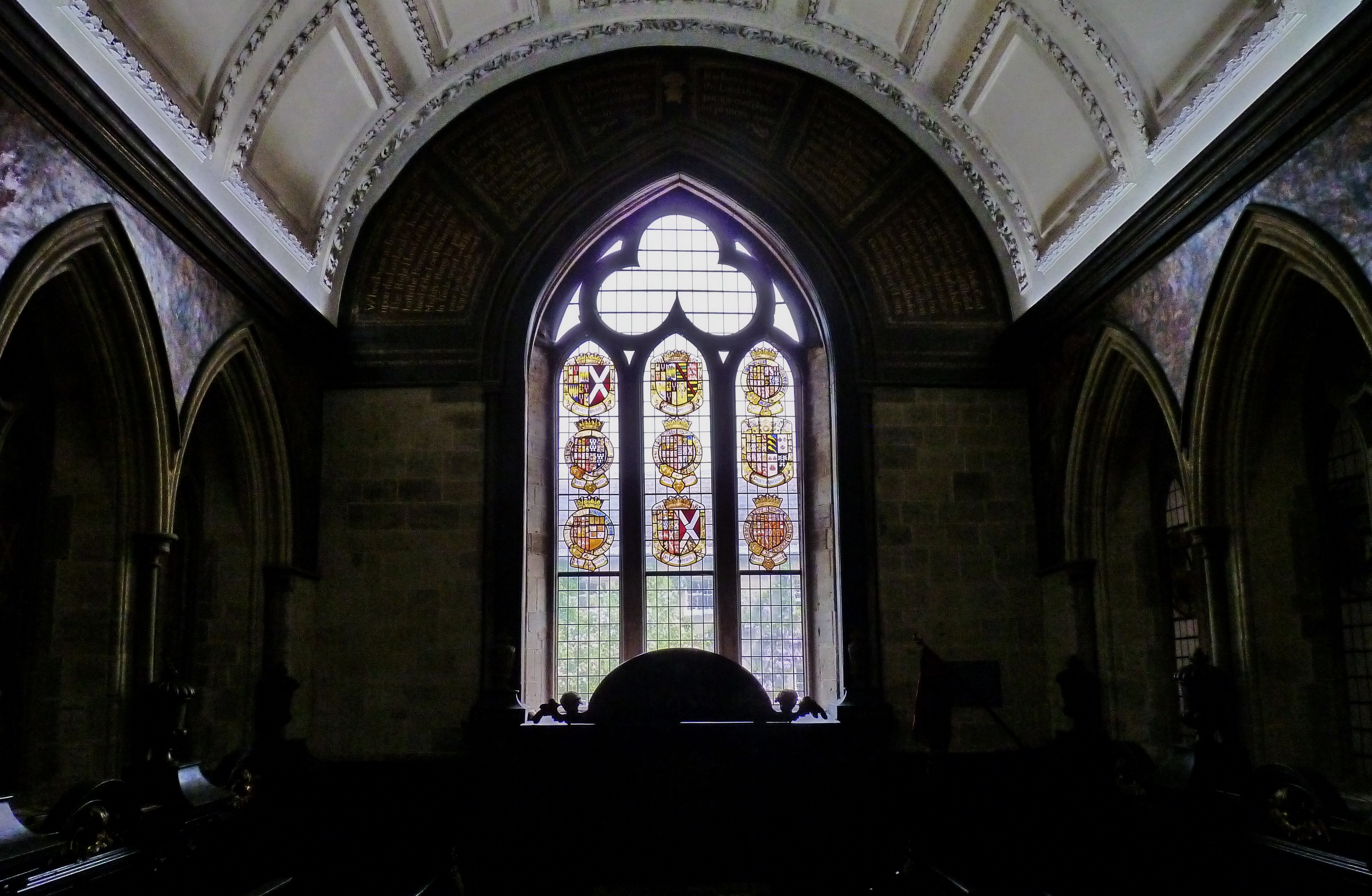
17th-century Percy Window in Petworth House, Sussex, displaying in stained glass 9 heraldic escutcheons of quartered arms of 1st, 3rd, 4th, 5th, 6th, father of 7th & 8th, 7th, 8th & 9th Percy Earls of Northumberland, each impaling the quartered arms of his wife.

In 1377, the next Henry Percy was created Earl of Northumberland, a title given to him after the coronation of Richard II. He supported the takeover by Henry IV but subsequently rebelled against the new king, leading to his estates being forfeited under attainder. In his rebellion he was aided by his son, the most famous Percy of all, Henry "Hotspur", who was slain at Shrewsbury in the lifetime of his father. Both the 1st Earl of Northumberland as well as his son Hotspur play a chief role in Shakespeare's Henry IV.

=== 1416 creation ===
Henry V restored Hotspur's son, the second Earl, to his family honours, and the Percys were staunch Lancastrians during the Wars of the Roses which followed, the third Earl and three of his brothers losing their lives in the cause.

Henry Percy, 4th Earl of Northumberland was involved in the political manoeuvrings of the last Yorkist kings Edward IV and Richard III. Through either indecision or treachery he did not respond in a timely manner at the Battle of Bosworth Field, and thus helped cause his ally Richard III's defeat at the hands of Henry Tudor (who became Henry VII). In 1489, he was pulled from his horse and murdered by some of his tenants.

Henry Percy, 6th Earl of Northumberland, loved Anne Boleyn, and was her accepted suitor before Henry VIII married her. He married later to Mary Talbot, the daughter of George Talbot, 4th Earl of Shrewsbury, but as he died without a son, his nephew Thomas Percy became the seventh Earl.

Thereafter, a succession of plots and counterplots—the Rising of the North, the plots to liberate Mary, Queen of Scots, and the Gunpowder Plot – each claimed a Percy among their adherents. On this account the eighth and ninth Earls spent many years in the Tower of London, but the tenth Earl, Algernon, fought against King Charles in the Civil War. The male line of the Percy-Louvain house and the earldom ended with Joceline Percy, 11th Earl of Northumberland.

Elizabeth Percy, heiress to the vast Percy estates married Charles Seymour, 6th Duke of Somerset. Upon the death of her grandson George Seymour, Viscount Beauchamp, the Percy inheritance was divided and Algernon Seymour, 7th Duke of Somerset was created Earl of Northumberland in 1749, with special remainder to his daughter Elizabeth Seymour, who had married a Yorkshire baronet, Sir Hugh Smithson. He inherited the earldom the following year and in 1766 was created the first Duke of Northumberland and Earl Percy, and it is their descendants who now represent the famous old house.

The current duke lives at Alnwick Castle and Syon House, just outside London.

== List of titleholders ==
=== Earls of Northumberland, first creation (1377) ===
- Henry Percy, 1st Earl of Northumberland (1341–1408) (attainted 1405)
  - Sir Henry Percy, also called Harry Hotspur (c. 1365–1403) heir apparent

=== Earls of Northumberland, second creation (1416) ===
- Henry Percy, 2nd Earl of Northumberland (1394–1455), grandson of 1st Earl and son of "Hotspur"
- Henry Percy, 3rd Earl of Northumberland (1421–1461), (forfeit 1461), son of 2nd Earl

=== Earl of Northumberland, third creation (1464) ===
- John Neville, Earl of Northumberland, (1st Marquess of Montagu) (1431–1471), (1464–1470 released)

=== Earls of Northumberland (1416, cont.) ===
- Henry Percy, 4th Earl of Northumberland (1449–1489) (restored 1470–1473), son of 3rd Earl
- Henry Algernon Percy, 5th Earl of Northumberland (1478–1527), son of 4th Earl
- Henry Percy, 6th Earl of Northumberland (1502–1537), son of 5th Earl, died without children
- Thomas Percy, 7th Earl of Northumberland (1528–1572), grandson of 5th Earl and son of Sir Thomas Percy (attainted, restored 1557)
- Henry Percy, 8th Earl of Northumberland (1532–1585), also grandson of 5th Earl, younger brother of 7th Earl
- Henry Percy, 9th Earl of Northumberland (1564–1632), son of 8th Earl
- Algernon Percy, 10th Earl of Northumberland (1602–1668), son of 9th Earl
- Josceline Percy, 11th Earl of Northumberland (1644–1670), son of 10th Earl, died leaving only one daughter, so the earldom became extinct

Various references use at least three different sequences of numbers for the earls; the ones shown here are those used in the individual articles on the 12 earls. The major difference arises from the question of whether Henry (1394–1455) was 1st as a new creation or 2nd as a restoration of the rights of his grandfather, Henry (1341–1408). Additionally, there is some debate about whether the 7th Earl was restored to the previous creation or was given a new creation.

=== Earls of Northumberland, fourth creation (1674) ===
- George FitzRoy, Earl of Northumberland (1665–1716) (became Duke of Northumberland in 1683; extinct)

=== Earls of Northumberland, fifth creation (1749) ===
- Algernon Seymour, 1st Earl of Northumberland (1684–1750), female-line grandson and heir of the 11th Earl of the 1416 creation
  - Elizabeth Percy née Seymour (1716–1776), only daughter of the 1st Earl, married Sir Hugh Smithson
- Hugh Percy, 2nd Earl of Northumberland (1714–1786), changed his name to Percy when he inherited the Earldom of Northumberland from his father-in-law by special remainder; became Duke of Northumberland in 1766

The line continues with the Dukes of Northumberland (third creation)

=== Family tree ===
Family tree of the Earls and Dukes of Northumberland and Earls of Beverley

King Henry III; 1207–1272
Baron Percy of Alnwick (2nd creation), 1299
Henry de Percy; 1273–1314; 8th Baron Percy of Topcliffe, 1st Baron Percy	Edmund Crouchback; 1245–1296; Earl of Leicester, Earl of Lancaster, Earl of Derby	King Edward I 1239–1307
Henry de Percy; 1300–1351; 9th Baron Percy of Topcliffe, 2nd Baron Percy	Henry c. 1281–1345; Earl of Leicester, Earl of Lancaster	King Edward II; 1284–1327
Henry de Percy; 1320–1368; 3rd Baron Percy	Mary of Lancaster c. 1320–1321–1362	Henry of Grosmont c. 1310–1361; Duke of Lancaster, Earl of Leicester	King Edward III; 1312–1377
Earl of Northumberland (1st creation), 1377	Earl of Worcester
Henry Percy; 1341–1408; 1st Earl of Northumberland, 4th Baron Percy	Thomas Percy; 1343–1403; Earl of Worcester	Blanche of Lancaster; 1342–1368	John of Gaunt; 1340–1399; Duke of Lancaster, Earl of Leicester, Earl of Derby, Earl of Richmond
(attainted 1405)
Henry Percy "Hotspur" c. 1365–1403	Joan Beaufort c. 1379–1440	John Beaufort c. 1370–1410; Earl of Somerset
Earl of Northumberland (2nd creation), 1416
Henry Percy; 1394–1455; 2nd Earl of Northumberland, 5th Baron Percy	Eleanor Neville c. 1398–1472	Richard Neville; 1400–1460; Earl of Salisbury	John Beaufort; 1404–1444; Duke of Somerset	Edmund Beaufort; 1406–1455; Duke of Somerset
Earl of Northumberland (3rd creation), 1464; Marquess of Montagu, 1470
Henry Percy; 1421–1461; 3rd Earl of Northumberland, 6th Baron Percy	John Neville c. 1431–1471; Marquess of Montagu, etc.	Eleanor Beaufort; 1431–1501	Margaret Beaufort; 1443–1509
(forfeit 1461)	Marquessate of Montagu and Earldom of Northumberland (3rd creation) forfeit, 1470
(restored 1470)
Henry Percy; 1449–1489; 4th Earl of Northumberland, 7th Baron Percy	King Henry VII; 1457–1509
Henry Algernon Percy; 1478–1527; 5th Earl of Northumberland, 8th Baron Percy	Katherine Spencer; 1477–1542	Mary Tudor (Queen of France); 1496–1533 m.(2) Charles Brandon; Duke of Suffolk	Margaret Tudor; 1489–1541
Duke of Northumberland (1st creation), 1551
Henry Percy; 1502–1537; 6th Earl of Northumberland, 9th Baron Percy	Thomas Percy c. 1504–1537	John Dudley; 1504–1553; 1st Duke of Northumberland	Frances Brandon; 1517–1559 m. Henry Grey; Duke of Suffolk	James V of Scotland; 1512–1542
(attainted 1537)	(extinct 1553)
Earl of Northumberland (2nd creation) restored and Baron Percy of Alnwick (3rd creation), 1557
Thomas Percy; 1528–1572; 7th Earl of Northumberland, 1st Baron Percy	Henry Percy; 1532–1585; 8th Earl of Northumberland, 2nd Baron Percy	Guildford Dudley c. 1535–1554	Jane Grey c. 1537–1554	Lady Katherine Grey; 1540–1568 m. Edward Seymour; Earl of Hertford	Mary, Queen of Scots; 1542–1587
Henry Percy; 1564–1632; 9th Earl of Northumberland, 3rd Baron Percy	Edward Seymour; 1561–1612; Viscount Beauchamp	King James VI and I 1566–1625
Algernon Percy; 1602–1668; 10th Earl of Northumberland, 4th Baron Percy	Francis Seymour c. 1590–1664; Baron Seymour of Trowbridge	King Charles I 1600–1649
Josceline Percy; 1644–1670; 11th Earl of Northumberland, 5th Baron Percy	Charles Seymour c. 1621–1665; Baron Seymour of Trowbridge	King Charles II; 1630–1685
Earldom of Northumberland and Barony Percy extinct, 1670
Earl of Northumberland (4th creation), Viscount Falmouth (1st creation), and Baron of Pontefract, 1674; Duke of Northumberland (2nd creation), 1683
Elizabeth Seymour; 1667–1722	Charles Seymour; 1662–1748; Duke of Somerset	George FitzRoy; 1665–1716; Duke of Northumberland, etc.
Earldom of Northumberland and Dukedom of Northumberland extinct, 1716
Baron Percy (4th creation) created erroneously, 1722; Earl of Northumberland (5th creation) and Baron Warkworth, 1749
Algernon Seymour; 1684–1750; Duke of Somerset, 1st Earl of Northumberland, etc. 1st Baron Percy
Duke of Northumberland (3rd creation), 1766; Lord Lovaine, Baron of Alnwick in the County of Northumberland
Hugh Percy formerly Hugh Smithson; 1714–1786; 1st Duke of Northumberland, 2nd Earl of Northumberland, etc. 1st Baron Lovaine, 4th Baronet Smithson	Elizabeth Seymour; 1716–1776; 2nd Baroness Percy suo jure
Earl of Beverley, 1790
Hugh Percy; 1742–1817; 2nd Duke of Northumberland, 3rd Earl of Northumberland, etc. 3rd Baron Percy	Algernon Percy; 1750–1830; 1st Earl of Beverley, 2nd Baron Lovaine
Baron Prudhoe, of Prudhoe Castle in the County of Northumberland, 1814
Hugh Percy; 1785–1847; 3rd Duke of Northumberland, 4th Earl of Northumberland, etc. 4th Baron Percy	Emily Frances Percy; 1789–1844	Algernon Percy; 1792–1865; 4th Duke of Northumberland, 5th Earl of Northumberland, etc. 1st Baron Prudhoe, 5th Baron Percy	George Percy; 1778–1867; 5th Duke of Northumberland, 6th Earl of Northumberland, etc. 2nd Earl of Beverley, 3rd Baron Lovaine
Barony Prudhoe extinct, 1865
George Augustus Frederick John Murray; 1814–1864; Duke of Atholl, Baron Strange	Algernon George Percy; 1810–1899; 6th Duke of Northumberland, 7th Earl of Northumberland, etc. 3rd Earl of Beverley, 4th Baron Lovaine
John James Hugh Henry Stewart-Murray; 1840–1917; Duke of Atholl, Baron Strange, 6th Baron Percy	Henry George Percy; 1846–1918; 7th Duke of Northumberland, 8th Earl of Northumberland, etc. 4th Earl of Beverley, 5th Baron Lovaine
John George Stewart-Murray; 1871–1942; Duke of Atholl, Baron Strange, 7th Baron Percy	James Thomas Stewart-Murray; 1879–1957; Duke of Atholl, Baron Strange, 8th Baron Percy	Alan Ian Percy; 1880–1930; 8th Duke of Northumberland, 9th Earl of Northumberland, etc. 5th Earl of Beverley, 6th Baron Lovaine
Henry George Alan Percy; 1912–1940; 9th Duke of Northumberland, 10th Earl of Northumberland, etc. 6th Earl of Beverley, 7th Baron Lovaine	Hugh Algernon Percy; 1914–1988; 10th Duke of Northumberland, 11th Earl of Northumberland, etc. 7th Earl of Beverley, 8th Baron Lovaine, 9th Baron Percy
Henry Alan Walter Richard Percy; 1953–1995; 11th Duke of Northumberland, 12th Earl of Northumberland, etc. 8th Earl of Beverley, 9th Baron Lovaine, 10th Baron Percy	Ralph George Algernon Percy b. 1956; 12th Duke of Northumberland, 13th Earl of Northumberland, etc. 9th Earl of Beverley, 10th Baron Lovaine, 11th Baron Percy
George Dominic Percy b. 1984 styled Earl Percy
Heir apparent to the Dukedom of Northumberland

== See also ==
- List of monarchs of Northumbria
- Earl of York
- Baron Percy

== Bibliography ==
=== Non-Fiction ===
- Chisholm, Hugh, ed. (1911). "Northumberland, Earls and Dukes of" . Encyclopædia Britannica. Vol. 19 (11th ed.). Cambridge University Press. pp. 787–788.
- Rose, Alexander. Kings in the North: The House of Percy in British History. Phoenix/Orion Books Ltd, 2002. ISBN 0-2978-1860-0, ISBN 1-8421-2485-4.
- Tate, George, The history of the borough, castle, and barony of Alnwick. Henry Hunter Hare, Alnwick, 1866

=== The Earls of Northumberland in Literature and Media ===
- The 1st Earl of Northumberland and his son, Henry "Hotspur", play large roles in Shakespeare's play, Henry IV, Part 1
- A Bloody Field by Shrewsbury by Edith Pargeter (1st Earl of Northumberland and Henry "Hotspur" Percy)
- Lion of Alnwick (Book 1 of The Percy Saga) by Carol Wensby-Scott (1st Earl of Northumberland and Henry "Hotspur" Percy)
- Lion Dormant (Book 2 of The Percy Saga) by Carol Wensby-Scott (Hotspur's son the 2nd Earl of Northumberland and his son the 3rd Earl of Northumberland)
- Lion Invincible (Book 3 of The Percy Saga) by Carol Wensby-Scott (The 4th Earl of Northumberland)
- Alnwick Castle, the traditional home of the Earls of Northumberland, was used as the location of Hogwarts School in the Harry Potter movies.

=== Notes ===
- This article incorporates text from a publication now in the public domain in the US: Northumberland Yesterday and To-day by Jean F. Terry, 1913
