= Thomas Percy, 1st Earl of Worcester =

14th-century English nobleman

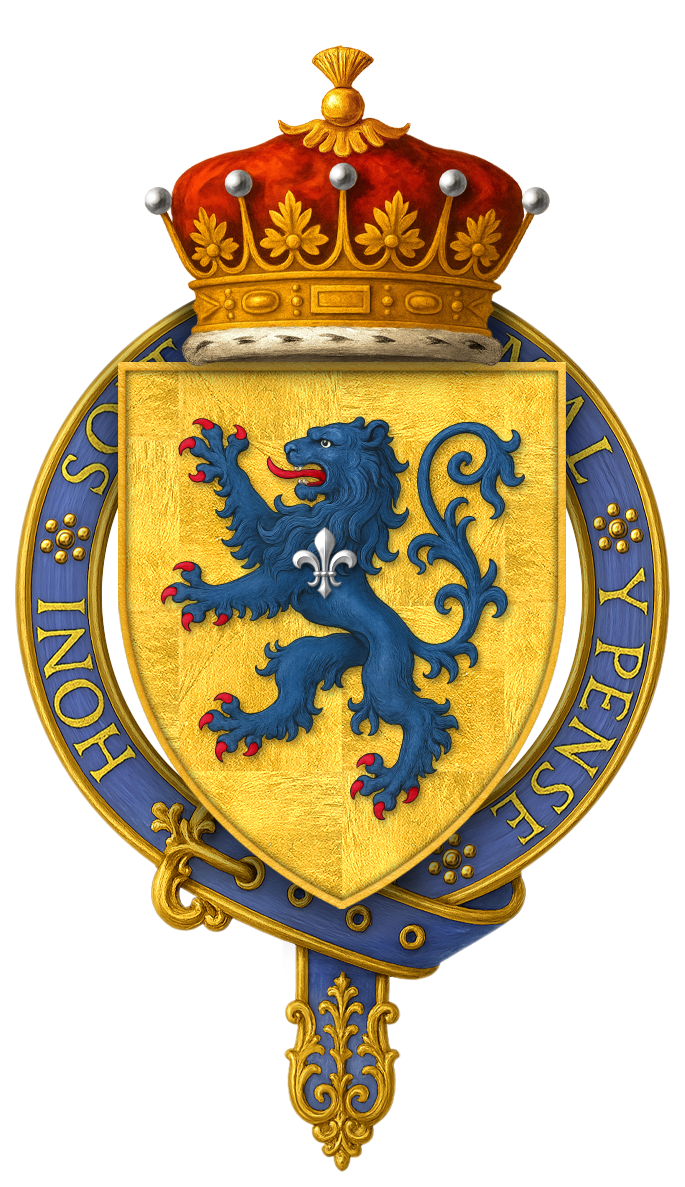
Arms of Sir Thomas Percy, Earl of Worcester, KG

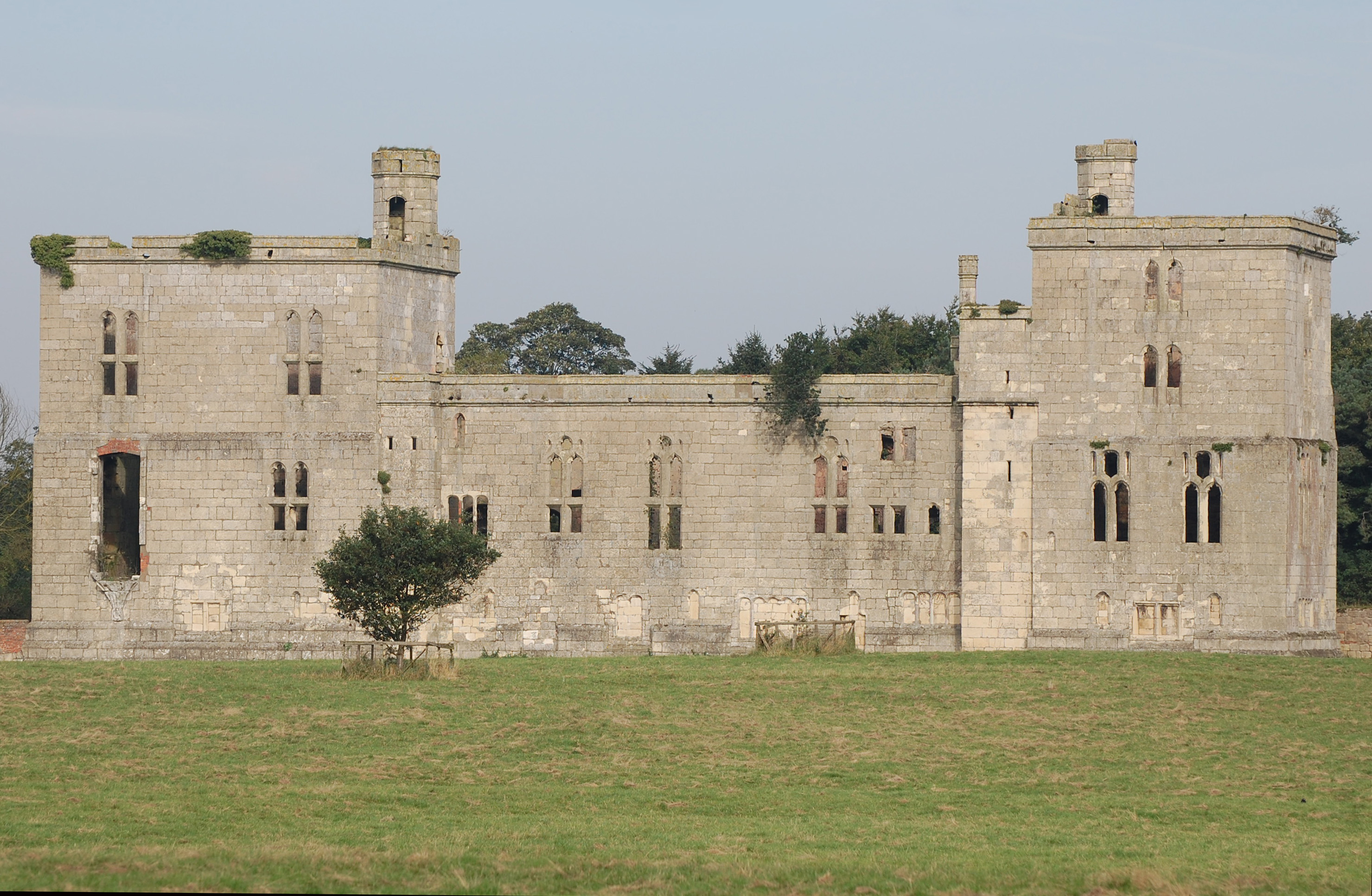
Worcester built Wressle Castle, Yorkshire in the 1390s.

Thomas Percy, Earl of Worcester, KG (1343 – 23 July 1403) was an English medieval nobleman and naval commander best known for leading a rebellion with his nephew Henry Percy, known as 'Harry Hotspur', and his elder brother, Henry Percy, 1st Earl of Northumberland.

== Lineage ==
He was the younger son of Henry de Percy, 3rd Baron Percy, and Mary, daughter of Henry, 3rd Earl of Lancaster, who in turn was a grandson of Henry III of England. He was the younger brother of Henry Percy, 1st Earl of Northumberland. Percy never married nor had children.

== Career ==
Worcester fought against England's traditional enemy France in the Hundred Years' War, and then served in various important governing posts in English-controlled France, as Ambassador, Seneschal. He was appointed Admiral of the North from 26 January 1384 to 22 February 1385. In the 1390s he built Wressle Castle. He was created Earl of Worcester in 1397 by King Richard II. In 1399 he was appointed Admiral of the Kings Fleet in Ireland.

== Close to the crown ==
Along with his brother and nephew, he took part in Henry IV's deposition of Richard II. He is said to have broken the staff of office symbolizing his position as Richard II's steward when declaring for the revolt. Later, in turn, he took part in the Percies' own subsequent rebellion against King Henry IV. He is said to have negotiated with Henry IV before the Battle of Shrewsbury and then misrepresented King Henry's offer for a settlement to persuade his nephew Henry "Hotspur" to reject the offer and fight the battle.

== Capture and execution ==
He was captured at the Battle of Shrewsbury and publicly beheaded in Shrewsbury two days later, on 23 July 1403. He was buried in St. Peter's, Shrewsbury, Shropshire, England. His head was displayed in London on London Bridge.

== Fictional portrayals ==
It pleased your Majesty to turn your looks
Of favour from myself and all our House;
And yet I must remember you, my lord,
We were the first and dearest of your friends.
For you my staff of office did I break
In Richard's time; and posted day and night
To meet you on the way, and kiss your hand,
When yet you were in place and in account
Nothing so strong and fortunate as I.
It was myself, my brother, and his son,
That brought you home, and boldly did outdare
The dangers of the time. You swore to us,—
And you did swear that oath at Doncaster,—
That you did nothing purpose 'gainst the state;
Nor claim no further than your new-fall'n right,
The seat of Gaunt, dukedom of Lancaster:
To this we swore our aid. But in short space
It rain'd down fortune showering on your head;
Such a flood of greatness fell on you,—
What with our help, what with the absent King,
What with the injuries of a wanton time,
The seeming sufferances that you had borne,
And the contrarious winds that held the King
So long in his unlucky Irish wars
That all in England did repute him dead,—
And, from this swarm of fair advantages,
You took occasion to be quickly woo'd
To gripe the general sway into your hand;
Forgot your oath to us at Doncaster;
And, being fed by us, you used us so
As that ungentle gull, the cuckoo-bird,
Useth the sparrow; did oppress our nest;
Grew by our feeding to so great a bulk,
That even our love thirst not come near your sight
For fear of swallowing; but with nimble wing
We were enforced, for safety-sake, to fly
Out of your sight, and raise this present head:
Whereby we stand opposed by such means
As you yourself have forged against yourself,
By unkind usage, dangerous countenance,
And violation of all faith and troth
Sworn to tis in your younger enterprise.

— William Shakespeare, Henry IV, Part 1

He appears in Shakespeare's Henry IV, Part 1 as the main plotter of the 1403 rebellion.

== Ancestry ==
Ancestors of Thomas Percy, Earl of Worcester

8. Henry de Percy, 1st Baron Percy
4. Henry de Percy, 2nd Baron Percy
9. Eleanor FitzAlan
2. Henry de Percy, 3rd Baron Percy
10. Robert de Clifford, 1st Lord Clifford
5. Idoine de Clifford
11. Maud de Clare
1. Thomas Percy, Earl of Worcester
12. Edmund Crouchback, Earl of Lancaster
6. Henry, 3rd Earl of Lancaster
13. Blanche of Artois
3. Mary of Lancaster
14. Patrick de Chaworth, Lord of Kidwelly
7. Maud Chaworth
15. Isabella de Beauchamp

Peerage of England
New creation	Earl of Worcester; 1397–1403	Extinct
