= Maud of Lancaster, Countess of Ulster =

Irish noble

Maud of Lancaster
- Countess of Ulster; Lady de Ufford
- Born: c. 1310
- Died: 5 May 1377 (aged about 67); Bruisyard Abbey, Suffolk, England
- Burial: Bruisyard Abbey
- Spouse: William Donn de Burgh, 3rd Earl of Ulster; Sir Ralph de Ufford
- Issue: Elizabeth de Burgh, suo jure Countess of Ulster; Maud de Ufford, Countess of Oxford
- House: Lancaster
- Father: Henry, 3rd Earl of Lancaster
- Mother: Maud Chaworth

Maud of Lancaster, Countess of Ulster (c. 1310 – 5 May 1377) was an English noblewoman and the wife of William Donn de Burgh, 3rd Earl of Ulster. She was the mother of Elizabeth de Burgh, suo jure Countess of Ulster. Her second husband was Sir Ralph de Ufford, Justiciar of Ireland. Their daughter was Maud de Ufford, Countess of Oxford. After Ufford's death, Maud became a canoness at an Augustinian nunnery, Campsey Priory, in Suffolk.

== Family and early life ==
Maud was born in about 1310, a daughter of Henry, 3rd Earl of Lancaster and Maud Chaworth. She had an older sister, Blanche, Baroness Wake of Liddell, and four younger sisters, Joan, Baroness Mowbray, Isabel of Lancaster, prioress of Amesbury, Eleanor, Countess of Arundel, and Mary, Baroness Percy. Her only brother was Henry of Grosmont, 1st Duke of Lancaster. His daughter was Blanche of Lancaster, who would in 1359 become the first wife of John of Gaunt, and in 1367 the mother of the future King Henry IV of England.

Maud's mother died in 1322, when Maud was twelve years old.

== Marriages and Issue ==
In 1327, Maud married her first husband, William de Burgh, 3rd Earl of Ulster. The couple received a papal dispensation for their marriage, which was dated 1 May 1327. Maud went to live in Ireland with her husband. Together they had one daughter who was born at Carrickfergus Castle in Belfast:

- Elizabeth de Burgh, suo jure Countess of Ulster (6 July 1332 – 10 December 1363), married Lionel of Antwerp, Duke of Clarence, by whom she had one daughter, Philippa Plantagenet, 5th Countess of Ulster.

In June 1333, Maud's husband was murdered, near Carrickfergus. After his murder, which sparked a civil war in Ireland, Maud fled to England with her infant daughter, who was the suo jure Countess of Ulster, and they lived at the court of King Edward III with the royal family. Due to her knowledge of Irish affairs, she had considerable influence in the appointment of Irish officials.

Maud married her second husband, Sir Ralph de Ufford, by 8 August 1343. Sir Ralph was the youngest son of Robert de Ufford, Lord Ufford, and Cecily de Valognes. In 1344, he was appointed Justiciar of Ireland, therefore Maud accompanied him in July of that year to Ireland, where she had another daughter:

- Maud de Ufford (1345/1346 – 25 January 1413), married Thomas de Vere, 8th Earl of Oxford, by whom she had one son, Robert de Vere, 9th Earl of Oxford, Duke of Ireland and Marquess of Dublin.

Maud's husband was an incompetent Justiciar, thoroughly despised by the Irish; under his badly managed administration, the civil war that was waged between the Desmond and de Burgh families was at its height. He was summoned before Parliament to answer for his misdeeds, and for the incessant quarrels and skirmishes permitted under his government between the Anglo-Norman noblemen.

== Religious life ==
Following the death of Ralph de Ufford on 9 April 1346 at Kilmainham, Maud once again returned to England. On a date between 8 August 1347 and 25 April 1348, she became a canoness at the Augustinian Campsey Priory in Suffolk. In 1364, she transferred to the Poor Clares at Bruisyard Abbey. She died there on 5 May 1377 at the age of about sixty-seven years. She was buried in Bruisyard Abbey.

== Ancestry ==
Ancestors of Maud of Lancaster, Countess of Ulster

Henry III of England
Edmund Crouchback, 1st Earl of Lancaster
Eleanor of Provence
Henry, 3rd Earl of Lancaster
Robert I of Artois
Blanche of Artois
Matilda of Brabant
Maud of Lancaster
Patrick de Chaworth
Patrick de Chaworth, Lord of Kidwelly
Hawise de Londres
Maud Chaworth
William de Beauchamp, 9th Earl of Warwick
Isabella de Beauchamp
Maud FitzJohn

== Sources ==
- Campbell, Anna (2017). "Franciscan Nuns in England, the Minoress Foundations and Their Patrons, 1281–1367". In Robson, Michael (ed.). The English Province of the Franciscans (1224-c.1350). Brill. pp. 426–447. ISBN 978-90-04-33162-4.
- Frame, Robin (2004). "Matilda of Lancaster, countess of Ulster (d. 1377)". Oxford Dictionary of National Biography (online ed.). Oxford University Press. doi:10.1093/ref:odnb/50027. (Subscription, Wikipedia Library access or UK public library membership required.)
- Weir, Alison (2008). Britain's Royal Families, The Complete Genealogy. Vintage Books. ISBN 978-0-09-953973-5.
