= Henry Percy, 1st Earl of Northumberland =

English noble (1341–1408)

Henry Percy
- Earl of Northumberland and King of Mann
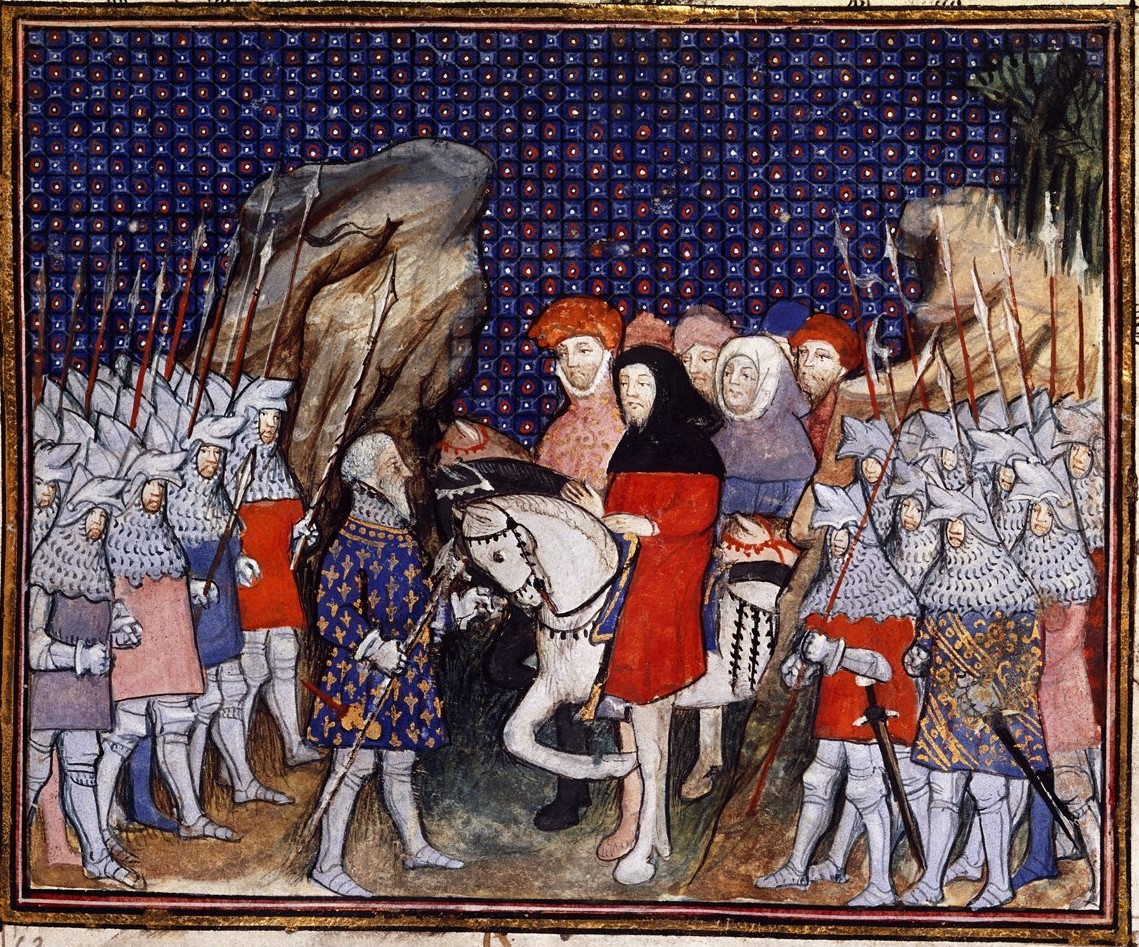
- Contemporary illustration from La Prinse et Mort du Roy Richart d'Angleterre of Henry Percy arresting King Richard II (hooded, on horse) at Conwy. The Earl of Northumberland wears a tabard bearing the arms of France: Azure semé-de-lis. He carries a pole-axe and is bare-headed as a mark of respect; a man of 57 at the time, he is grey-haired with a pointed beard.
- Born: 10 November 1341; Alnwick, Northumberland, England
- Died: 20 February 1408 (aged 66); Bramham Moor, Yorkshire, England
- Noble family: Percy
- Spouses: Margaret Neville; Maud Lucy
- Issue: Harry "Hotspur" Percy; Sir Thomas Percy; Sir Ralph Percy; Alan Percy; Margaret Percy
- Father: Henry de Percy, 3rd Baron Percy
- Mother: Mary of Lancaster

Arms of Percy

Henry Percy, 1st Earl of Northumberland, 4th Baron Percy, titular King of Mann, KG, Lord Marshal (10 November 1341 – 20 February 1408), was an English statesman and a leading political figure during the reigns of Richard II and Henry IV. One of the most powerful noblemen in northern England, he played a decisive role in the deposition of Richard II and the accession of Henry IV.

He was the son of Henry de Percy, 3rd Baron Percy, and a descendant of Henry III of England. His mother was Mary of Lancaster, daughter of Henry, 3rd Earl of Lancaster, son of Edmund, Earl of Leicester and Lancaster, who in turn was the son of Henry III.

== Life ==
Henry Percy was originally a follower of Edward III of England, for whom he held high offices in the administration of northern England. At a young age, he was made Warden of the Marches towards Scotland in 1362, with the authority to negotiate with the Scottish government. In February 1367, he was entrusted with the supervision of all castles and fortified places in the Scottish marches. As a supporter of John of Gaunt he was given the title of Marshal of England in December 1376 although he would give that up in 1377. He and Gaunt were the center of events that led to the London riots of 1377 where with Gaunt he had to take refuge with the Black Prince's widow Joan of Kent in Kennington. As Marshal he had an important role in the coronation of King Richard II in 1377 where he was formally created an Earl.

Between 1383 and 1384, he was appointed Admiral of the Northern Seas. After Richard elevated his rival Ralph Neville to the position of Earl of Westmorland in 1397, Percy and his son, also Henry and known as "Hotspur", supported the rebellion of Henry Bolingbroke, who became King as Henry IV.

On King Henry IV's coronation, Henry Percy was appointed Constable of England and granted the lordship of the Isle of Man. Percy and Hotspur were given the task of subduing the rebellion of Owain Glyndŵr, but their attempts to make peace with the Welsh rebels did not meet with the king's approval.

== Rebellion ==
In September 1402 the Percys took part in the Battle of Homildon Hill, which led to the capture of many Scots nobles. Henry did not want them to be ransomed, leading to another quarrel. In 1403 the Percys turned against Henry IV in favour of Edmund Mortimer, 5th Earl of March, and then conspired with Owain Glyndŵr against Henry. The Percy rebellion failed at the Battle of Shrewsbury, where Hotspur was killed. Since the earl did not directly participate in the rebellion, he was not convicted of treason. However, he lost his office as Constable.

In 1405 all three parties signed the Tripartite Indenture, which divided England up between them. Glyndŵr was to be given Wales, and a substantial part of the west of England, Northumberland was to have received the north of England, as well as Northamptonshire, Norfolk, Warwickshire, and Leicestershire. The Mortimers were to have received the rest of southern England, below the river Trent.

Later in 1405 Percy supported Richard le Scrope, Archbishop of York, in another rebellion, after which Percy fled to Scotland, and his estates were confiscated by the king.

In 1408 Percy invaded England in rebellion once more and was killed at the Battle of Bramham Moor. His severed head was subsequently put on display at London Bridge.

== Marriages and issue ==
Alnwick Castle, held by Henry Percy, possible birthplace of his son "Harry Hotspur"

In 1358, he married Margaret Neville (12 February 1339 – 12 May 1372), daughter of Ralph Neville, 2nd Baron Neville de Raby, and Alice de Audley. They had four sons (Harry "Hotspur" Percy, Thomas, Ralph, and Alan) and one daughter (Margaret).

Canting arms of Lucy of Cockermouth Castle: Gules, three lucies hauriant argent

In 1381, he married Maud Lucy (1343 – 18 December 1398), daughter of Sir Thomas de Lucy, 2nd Baron Lucy, and Margaret de Multon, and thus sister and heiress of Anthony Lucy, 3rd Baron Lucy (died 1368), of Cockermouth Castle, Cumbria, which estate he inherited on condition that he and his heirs male should bear the arms of Lucy (Gules, three lucies hauriant argent) quarterly with their own. They had no issue.

== In literature and media ==
Northumberland is a character in Shakespeare's Richard II, Henry IV, part 1, and Henry IV, part 2.

The first volume of Carol Wensby-Scott's Percy trilogy, The Lion of Alnwick, follows the life of Henry Percy, 1st Earl of Northumberland.

Henry Percy appears in Edith Pargeter's novel A Bloody Field by Shrewsbury.

He also appears in Georgette Heyer's historical novel My Lord John.

In the 2019 film The King, Tom Fisher is credited as playing Northumberland.

== Ancestry ==
Ancestors of Henry Percy, 1st Earl of Northumberland

8. Henry de Percy, 1st Baron Percy
4. Sir Henry de Percy, 2nd Baron Percy
9. Eleanor FitzAlan
2. Henry de Percy, 3rd Baron Percy
10. Robert de Clifford, 1st Baron de Clifford
5. Idoine de Clifford
11. Maud de Clare
1. Henry Percy, 1st Earl of Northumberland
12. Edmund Crouchback, 1st Earl of Lancaster
6. Henry, 3rd Earl of Lancaster
13. Blanche of Artois
3. Mary of Lancaster
14. Sir Patrick de Chaworth, Lord of Kidwelly
7. Maud Chaworth
15. Isabella de Beauchamp

Political offices
Preceded by The Countess of Norfolk	Lord Marshal; 1377	Succeeded by The Lord Maltravers
Peerage of England
Preceded by New Creation	Earl of Northumberland; 1377–1405	Succeeded by forfeit/Henry Percy
Preceded by Henry de Percy	Baron Percy; 1368–1405	Succeeded by forfeit/Henry Percy
Head of State of the Isle of Man
Preceded by William le Scrope	King of Mann; 1399–1405	Succeeded by John I Stanley
