= Henry, Earl of Lancaster =

Henry, Earl of Lancaster may refer to:

- Henry, 3rd Earl of Lancaster from 1322 to 1345
- Henry of Grosmont, Duke of Lancaster, Earl from 1345 to 1351

== See also ==
- Earl of Lancaster
