= 1st Duke of Lancaster =

1st Duke of Lancaster may refer to:

- John of Gaunt, 1st Duke of Lancaster, (1340 – 1399), member of the House of Plantagenet
- Henry of Grosmont, 1st Duke of Lancaster, (c. 1310 – 1361), also Earl of Derby, member of the English nobility

== See also ==
- Duke of Lancaster
