= Northern Rising (1405) =

Failed English rebellion

The 1405 Northern Rising was a failed English rebellion against the rule of Henry IV. It ended in the execution of its leaders Richard Scrope and Thomas Mowbray.

== Background ==
King Henry had usurped his cousin Richard II in 1399 and his rule was fragile due to the lack of dynastic legitimacy. The Northern Percy family, despite initially supporting Henry's rebellion, turned against Henry in 1403 in favour of Edmund Mortimer, and conspired with him and the Welsh rebel Owain Glyndŵr against Henry although the Percy rebellion failed at the Battle of Shrewsbury, where the heir Hotspur was killed. Since Henry Percy, the Earl of Northumberland did not directly participate in the rebellion, he was not convicted of treason. However, he lost his office as Constable of England.

== Rebellion ==
In 1405 after signing the Tripartite Indenture, Percy joined by Thomas Bardolf, rebelled against Henry. The rising got off to a bad start when the Percys failed to capture Henry's ally Ralph Neville the Earl of Westmorland, with Percy himself retreating to Berwick Castle.

Mowbray, the Duke of Norfolk, rode to York where Scrope as Archbishop preached a sermon to the Minster denouncing the bad government of the Kingdom. As Yorkshire had a strong Percy influence they found that together with Scrope's nephew, Sir William Plumpton, they could assemble a force of some 8000 men on Shipton Moor on 27 May. Two days later they were met by a smaller royalist force led by Neville and one of the King's younger sons, John.

Instead of giving battle Scrope parleyed with Westmorland, and was tricked into believing that his demands would be accepted and his personal safety guaranteed, in return they agreed to disband the rebel army. Contemporary writers state that Scrope and his allies were tricked into surrendering by Westmorland; however the later Otterbourne chronicler claimed that they had surrendered voluntarily

== Aftermath ==
Once the rebels had disbanded Scrope and Mowbray were arrested by Westmoreland and taken to Pontefract Castle to await the king who arrived with his army at York in early June. Thomas Arundel, the Archbishop of Canterbury, rode overnight to argue that Scrope as Archbishop of York needed to be tried by Parliament.

The king instead decided on a commission headed by the Earl of Arundel and Sir Thomas Beaufort to sit in judgment on the archbishop, Mowbray and Plumpton in Scrope's own hall at his manor of Bishopthorpe, some three miles south of York. The chief justice, Sir William Gascoigne, refused to participate in such irregular proceedings and to pronounce judgment on a Prince of the Church, and it was thus left to the lawyer Sir William Fulthorpe to condemn Scrope to death for high treason.

Scrope, Mowbray and Plumpton were taken to a field belonging to the nunnery of Clementhorpe which lay just under the walls of York, and before a great crowd were beheaded on 8 June 1405. Archbishop Scrope requested the executioner to deal him five blows in remembrance of the Five Wounds of Christ, which was a popular devotion in Catholic England. After his execution, Archbishop Richard Scrope was buried in York Minster.

Henry IV then moved his army to take the northern Percy fortresses, using cannon in England for the first time Percy together with Thomas Bardolf escaped to Scotland and lost his title.

Henry IV was ill until the end of his reign and some medieval writers felt that he was struck with leprosy as a punishment for his execution of an Archbishop.

== Treatment by Shakespeare ==
Scrope's parley with Westmorland at Shipton Moor, Lancaster and Westmorland's treachery, and Scrope's arrest after the dispersal of his army are depicted in Act IV of Shakespeare's Henry IV, Part 2. In the play, the king's agents are shown persuading the archbishop and the other rebel leaders to disband their army by promising that their demands will be met and then arresting them for high treason. Every member of their army is then executed without trial. According to historian John Julius Norwich, the actions of the king's agents continue to outrage audiences who watch the play being performed.

== Sources ==
- Bean, J. M. W. (26 May 2005). "Percy, Henry, first earl of Northumberland". Oxford Dictionary of National Biography (online ed.). Oxford University Press. (Subscription, Wikipedia Library access or UK public library membership required.)
- Castor, Helen (2024). The Eagle and the Hart: The Tragedy of Richard II and Henry IV. Allen Lane. ISBN 0241419328.
- McNiven, Peter (2004). "Scrope, Richard (c.1350–1405)". Oxford Dictionary of National Biography (online ed.). Oxford University Press. doi:10.1093/ref:odnb/24964. (Subscription, Wikipedia Library access or UK public library membership required.)
- Norwich, John Julius (2000). Shakespeare's Kings: the Great Plays and the History of England in the Middle Ages: 1337–1485. New York: Scribner. ISBN 978-0-684-81434-6.
- Pollard, Albert (1901). "Bardolf, Thomas" . Dictionary of National Biography (1st supplement). Vol. 1. pp. 123–124.
- Tait, James (1897). "Neville, Ralph (1364-1425)" . Dictionary of National Biography. Vol. 40. pp. 275–280.
- Tout, T.F. (1901). "Glendower, Owen (1359?–1416?), Welsh rebel" . In Stephen, Leslie (ed.). Dictionary of National Biography. Vol. 21. London: Smith, Elder & Co.
- Tuck, Anthony (January 2008) [2004]. "Neville, Ralph, first earl of Westmorland (c.1364–1425)". Oxford Dictionary of National Biography (online ed.). Oxford University Press. doi:10.1093/ref:odnb/19951. (Subscription, Wikipedia Library access or UK public library membership required.)
