= Mary of Lancaster =

- Baroness Percy
- Born: c. 1320–21; Tutbury Castle, Staffordshire, England
- Died: 1 September 1362 (aged 40–42); Alnwick, Northumberland, England
- Spouse: Henry Percy
- Issue: Henry Percy, 1st Earl of Northumberland; Thomas Percy, 1st Earl of Worcester
- House: Lancaster
- Father: Henry, 3rd Earl of Lancaster
- Mother: Maud Chaworth

Mary of Lancaster, Baroness Percy (c. 1320–1321 – 1 September 1362), was the youngest surviving child of Henry, 3rd Earl of Lancaster by his wife Maud Chaworth. Through her father, she was a great-granddaughter of Henry III of England.

== Family ==
Mary was born in 1320 or 1321. She was a sister of Henry of Grosmont, 1st Duke of Lancaster, Maud, Countess of Ulster, Joan, Baroness de Mowbray, and Eleanor, Countess of Arundel. Through her brother Henry, she was the aunt of Blanche of Lancaster, first wife of John of Gaunt and mother of Henry IV of England.

== Marriage ==
Near September 1334 at Tutbury Castle, she married Henry Percy, eldest son of Henry de Percy, 2nd Baron Percy and Idoine de Clifford. He succeeded his father as 3rd Baron Percy in 1352.

They had the following surviving issue:

- Henry Percy, 1st Earl of Northumberland (10 November 1341 – 20 February 1408) married firstly Margaret Neville and secondly Maud, Baroness Lucy.
- Thomas Percy, 1st Earl of Worcester (1344–1403).

== Death ==
Mary died at Alnwick, Northumberland, England on 1 September 1362, where she was also buried. Her husband Henry would marry a second time to Joan Orreby, daughter and heiress of John, 2nd Lord Orreby.

== Ancestry ==
Ancestors of Mary of Lancaster

16. John of England
8. Henry III of England
17. Isabella of Angoulême
4. Edmund Crouchback, 1st Earl of Lancaster
18. Ramon Berenguer IV, Count of Provence
9. Eleanor of Provence
19. Beatrice of Savoy
2. Henry, 3rd Earl of Lancaster
20. Louis VIII of France
10. Robert I of Artois
21. Blanche of Castile
5. Blanche of Artois
22. Henry II, Duke of Brabant
11. Matilda of Brabant
23. Marie of Hohenstaufen
1. Mary of Lancaster
12. Patrick de Chaworth
6. Patrick de Chaworth, Lord of Kidwelly
13. Hawise de London
3. Maud Chaworth
28. William Beauchamp
14. William de Beauchamp, 9th Earl of Warwick
29. Isabella Mauduit
7. Isabella de Beauchamp
30. John FitzGeoffrey
15. Maud FitzJohn
31. Isabel Bigod
