= Philip le Despenser =

English noble, circa 1290–1313

- Born: c. 1290
- Died: 24 September 1313
- Noble family: le Despenser
- Spouse: Margaret de Goushill
- Issue: Philip Despenser; Hawise Despenser
- Father: Hugh le Despenser
- Mother: Isabella de Beauchamp

Sir Philip Despenser (c. 1290 – 24 September 1313) of Goxhill, Lincolnshire was the son of Hugh Despenser, 1st Earl of Winchester and his wife, Isabella de Beauchamp, daughter of William de Beauchamp, 9th Earl of Warwick and Maud FitzJohn. He married Margaret de Goushill, daughter of Ralph De Gousille and his wife Hawise Fitzwarine. Philip was brother to Hugh Despenser the Younger, a favorite of King Edward II.

They were parents to:

- Sir Philip Despenser (6 April 1313 – 23 April 1349) who was father to:
  - Philip le Despenser, 1st Baron le Despenser (18 October 1342 – 4 August 1401);
  - Hawise Despenser (c. 1345 – 10 April 1414), was the 2nd wife of Sir Andrew Luttrell, Lord Luttrell of Irnham by whom she had issue.
