= Blanche of Lancaster, Baroness Wake of Liddell =

English noblewoman, died 1380

Blanche of Lancaster, Baroness Wake of Liddell (c. 1305 – c. 1380) was an English noblewoman. She was the eldest daughter of Henry, 3rd Earl of Lancaster and Maud Chaworth. Blanche was named after her grandmother, Blanche of Artois, who had ruled Navarre as regent.

== Life ==
Sometime before 9 October 1316, she married Thomas Wake, 2nd Baron Wake of Liddell, who had been under guardianship of her father. The marriage remained childless.

The Bishop of Ely burned down some of her houses after her husband's death in 1349 and she took legal action against him. Edward III rebuked the bishop for the arson, and ordered him to pay damages. The bishop subsequently had her servant William Holm murdered. Edward then confiscated his possessions and made him ask for forgiveness.

After her brother Henry died, she was one of the executors of his will. In April 1372, custody of brothers John and Thomas was granted to her, as sister of their grandmother, Joan of Lancaster. She lived on to see the start of the reign of King Edward's grandson, Richard II. On her death she was buried at Greyfriars, Stamford.

== Ancestry ==
Ancestors of Blanche of Lancaster, Baroness Wake of Liddell

16. John of England
8. Henry III of England
17. Isabella of Angoulême
4. Edmund Crouchback, 1st Earl of Lancaster
18. Ramon Berenguer IV, Count of Provence
9. Eleanor of Provence
19. Beatrice of Savoy
2. Henry, 3rd Earl of Lancaster
20. Louis VIII of France
10. Robert I of Artois
21. Blanche of Castile
5. Blanche of Artois
22. Henry II, Duke of Brabant
11. Matilda of Brabant
23. Marie of Hohenstaufen
1. Blanche of Lancaster
24. Pain de Chaworth
12. Patrick de Chaworth
25. Gundred Ferté
6. Sir Patrick de Chaworth of Kidwelly
26. Sir Thomas de Londres
13. Hawise de London
27. Eve FitzWarin
3. Maud Chaworth
28. William III de Beauchamp
14. William de Beauchamp, 9th Earl of Warwick
29. Isabella Mauduit
7. Isabella de Beauchamp
30. John FitzGeoffrey
15. Maud FitzJohn
31. Isabel Bigod

== Notes ==
Works cited

- Mortimer, Ian (2008). The Perfect King The Life of Edward III, Father of the English Nation. Vintage Books. ISBN 978-0099527091.
- Ormrod, W. M. (2004). "Wake, Thomas, second Lord Wake (1298–1349)". Oxford Dictionary of National Biography (online ed.). Oxford University Press. doi:10.1093/ref:odnb/28408. (Subscription, Wikipedia Library access or UK public library membership required.)
- Weir, Alison (2008). Britain's Royal Families, The Complete Genealogy. Vintage Books. ISBN 978-0-09-953973-5.
