= Henry Percy, 3rd Baron Percy =

English noble (c.1321–1368)

Henry Percy
- 3rd Baron Percy
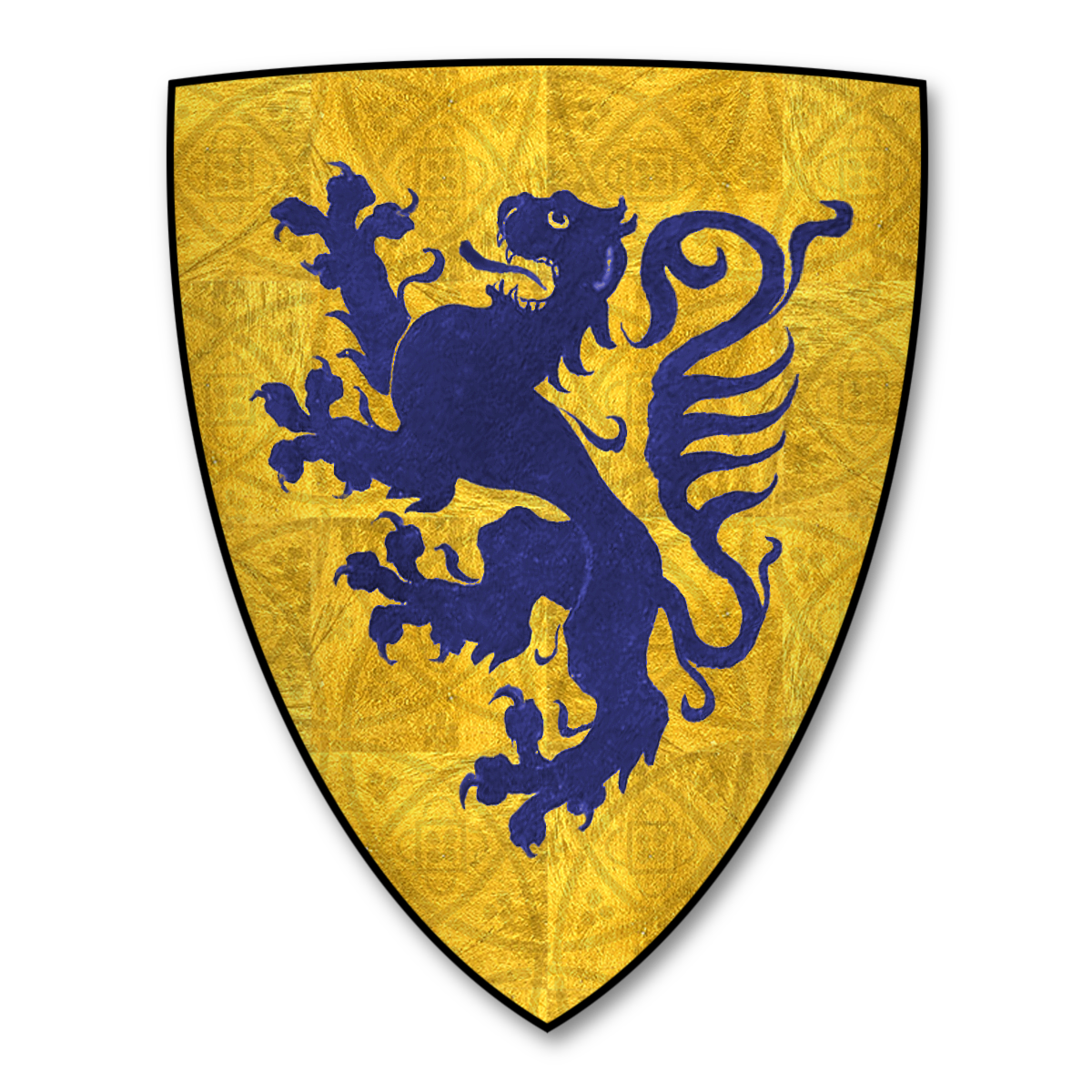
- Coat of Arms of Percy, Barons Percy of Alnwick (Or, a lion rampant Azure)
- Other titles: Warden of the Marches, High Sheriff of Northumberland
- Born: 1321
- Died: 18 May 1368 (aged 46–47); Alnwick Castle, Northumberland, England
- Noble family: House of Percy
- Spouses: Mary of Lancaster (d. 1362); Joan (d. 1368), the daughter and sole heiress of John, Lord Orreby
- Issue: Henry Percy, 1st Earl of Northumberland; Thomas Percy, 1st Earl of Worcester
- Father: Henry de Percy, 2nd Baron Percy
- Mother: Idoine de Clifford

Henry Percy, 3rd Baron Percy of Alnwick (c. 1321–1368), was the eldest son of Henry de Percy, 2nd Baron Percy (1301–1352), and his wife, Idoine de Clifford (Idonea in Latin and also in English), daughter of Robert de Clifford, 1st Baron de Clifford.

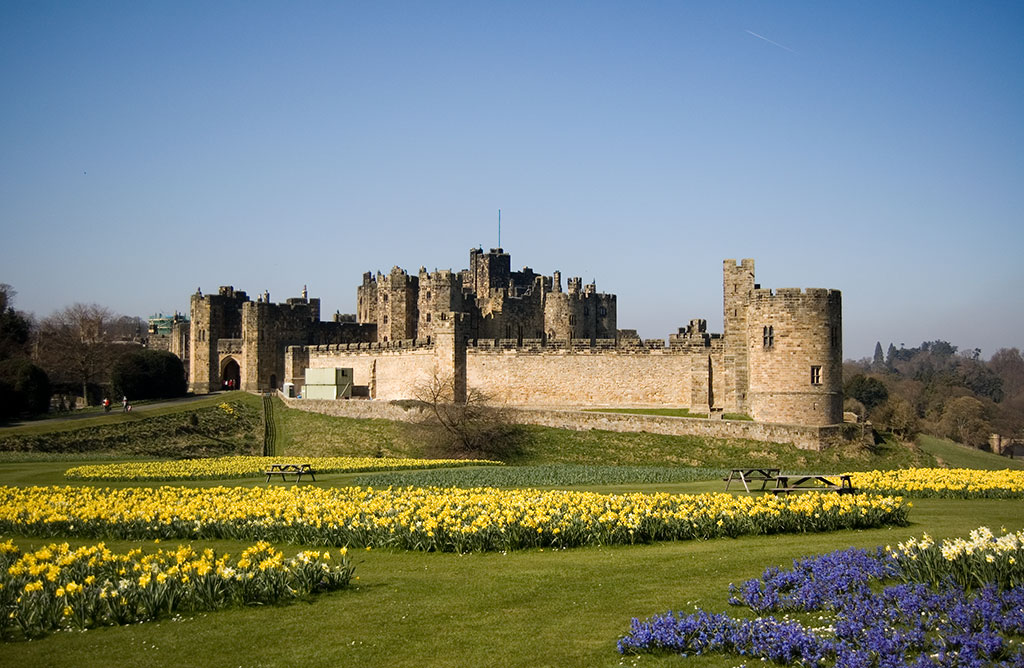
Alnwick Castle- the Percy seat in Northumberland

== Battle of Crécy ==
He served in France under the Earl of Arundel in March 1344 and in August 1346 was at the Battle of Crécy. He then transferred to service in Gascony under the Earl of Lancaster. In July 1352 he was made joint warden of the marches towards Scotland, and in September 1355 keeper of Roxburgh Castle and sheriff of Northumberland for two years.

== Invasion of Scotland ==
In 1356 he took part in the invasion of Scotland that followed Edward Balliol's surrender of the kingdom and crown of Scotland to Edward III. In July 1356 he was once again joint warden of the marches and then took part in the negotiations that led to the treaty of Berwick of October 1357.

== France ==
He participated in Edward III's military efforts in France and in September 1355 was marshal of the royal army at Calais. In 1360 he took part in Edward's campaign to capture Rheims.

== Marriage ==
He had married twice: firstly Mary of Lancaster (d. 1362), daughter of Henry, 3rd Earl of Lancaster, and secondly Joan (d. 1368), the daughter and sole heiress of John, Lord Orreby.

With his first wife he had two sons, Henry and Thomas. He was succeeded by his eldest son who became Henry Percy, 1st Earl of Northumberland. His younger son became Thomas Percy, 1st Earl of Worcester. With his second wife he had a son who died in his father's lifetime and a daughter, Mary (1367-1394) who married John de Ros, 5th Baron de Ros.

== Death ==
He died on or about 18 May 1368, probably at his castle of Alnwick, and was buried in Alnwick Abbey.

Peerage of England
Preceded by Henry Percy	Baron Percy; 1352–1368	Succeeded by Henry Percy
