= Joan of Lancaster =

- Baroness de Mowbray
- Born: c. 1312; Norfolk, England
- Died: 7 July 1349 (aged c. 36-37); Yorkshire, England
- Spouse: John de Mowbray, 3rd Baron Mowbray (m. 1326/27; her death 1349)
- Issue: John de Mowbray, 4th Baron Mowbray
- House: Lancaster
- Father: Henry, 3rd Earl of Lancaster
- Mother: Maud Chaworth

Joan of Lancaster (c. 1312 – 7 July 1349) sometimes called Joan Plantagenet after her dynasty's name, was the third daughter of Henry, 3rd Earl of Lancaster and Maud Chaworth.

== Royal family ties ==
Joan of Lancaster was born c. 1312 at Grosmont Castle in Monmouthshire. Her father was the son of Edmund Crouchback, 1st Earl of Lancaster and Blanche of Artois, Queen Dowager of Navarre, a granddaughter of Louis VIII of France and Blanche of Castile. Her paternal great-grandparents were Henry III of England and Eleanor of Provence. Joan was thus doubly descended from Henry II and Eleanor of Aquitaine.

Joan's mother was a half-sister of Edward II's favorite, Hugh le Despenser the Younger, through the remarriage of Maud's mother, Isabella de Beauchamp, to Hugh le Despenser, 1st Earl of Winchester. Joan had one brother, Henry of Grosmont, 1st Duke of Lancaster, and five sisters, Blanche, Baroness Wake of Liddell, Isabel, Abbess of Amesbury, Maud, Countess of Ulster, Eleanor, Countess of Arundel and Warenne, and Mary, Baroness Percy.

Joan's niece, Elizabeth de Burgh, Countess of Ulster, married Lionel of Antwerp, Duke of Clarence, the second surviving son of Edward III and Philippa of Hainault, a marriage that would create a line of descent to strengthen the Yorkist claim to the throne in the Wars of the Roses. Another niece, Blanche of Lancaster, married the third surviving son of Edward III, John of Gaunt, and became the mother of the first Lancastrian king of England, Henry IV.

== Marriage and children ==
Joan married John de Mowbray, 3rd Baron Mowbray on 28th of February 1327. They had three children:

- Blanche de Mowbray (died 1409), who was married five times - first, to John de Segrave; second, to Robert Bertram; third, to Thomas Poynings; fourth, to Sir John Worth; and fifth, to Sir John Wiltshire.
- Eleanor de Mowbray (d. 29 June 1387), who was married twice - first, to Roger la Warr, 3rd Baron De La Warr (1326-1370) as his third wife, before 23 July 1358; and second, to Sir Lewis de Clifford.
- John de Mowbray, 4th Baron Mowbray (25 June 1340 – 1368), married Elizabeth de Segrave

Joan died in Yorkshire, England of the plague. She was interred at Byland Abbey in North Yorkshire.
