= Maud Chaworth =

English noblewoman and heiress (1282–1322)

- Born: 2 February 1282
- Died: 3 December 1322 (aged 40)
- Spouse: Henry, 3rd Earl of Lancaster
- Issue: Henry of Grosmont; Blanche, Baroness Wake of Liddell; Maud, Countess of Ulster; Joan, Baroness Mowbray; Isabel, Prioress of Amesbury; Eleanor, Countess of Arundel; Mary, Baroness Percy
- Father: Patrick de Chaworth, Lord of Kidwelly
- Mother: Isabella de Beauchamp

Maud de Chaworth (2 February 1282 – 3 December 1322) was an English noblewoman and wealthy heiress. She was the only child of Patrick de Chaworth. Sometime before 2 March 1297, she married Henry, 3rd Earl of Lancaster, by whom she had seven children.

== Early life ==
Maud was the daughter of Sir Patrick de Chaworth, Baron of Kidwelly, in Carmarthenshire, South Wales, and Isabella de Beauchamp. Her maternal grandfather was William de Beauchamp, 9th Earl of Warwick. Her father died on 7 July 1283; he was thought to be 30 years old. His paternal line was from the Castle of Chaources, now Sourches, in the Commune of St. Symphorien, near Le Mans in the County of Maine at the time of the Angevin Empire. Three years later, in 1286, Isabella de Beauchamp married Hugh Despenser the Elder and had two sons and four daughters by him. This made Maud the half-sister of Hugh Despenser the Younger. Her mother died in 1306.

Maud was only a year old when her father died, and his death left her a wealthy heiress. However, because she was an infant, she became a ward of Queen Eleanor.

Queen Eleanor died in 1290. On 30 December 1292, King Edward I granted his brother Edmund Crouchback, Earl of Lancaster, the right to arrange Maud's marriage. Edmund arranged the marriage between Maud and one of his sons, Henry.

== Marriage and issue ==
Henry and Maud were married sometime before 2 March 1297. Henry was a little older, having probably been born in 1280 or 1281. Maud brought her father's property to the marriage, including land in Hampshire, Glamorgan, Wiltshire, and Carmarthenshire. Maud is often described as the "Countess of Leicester" or "Countess of Lancaster", but she never bore the titles as she died in 1322, before her husband received them.

Maud and Henry had seven children:

- Blanche (c. 1302/1305 – c. 1380), Baroness Wake of Liddell
- Henry of Grosmont (c. 1310–1361), Duke of Lancaster, one of the great English magnates of the 14th century
- Maud (c. 1310 – 5 May 1377), Countess of Ulster
- Joan (c. 1312–1345), married John de Mowbray, 3rd Baron Mowbray
- Isabel of Lancaster, Prioress of Amesbury (c. 1317 – post-1347), prioress of Amesbury Priory
- Eleanor (1318–1372), married John de Beaumont, 2nd Baron Beaumont (died 1342), secondly Richard FitzAlan, 3rd Earl of Arundel
- Mary (c. 1320–1362), married Henry de Percy, 3rd Baron Percy

== Ancestry ==
Ancestors of Maud Chaworth

8. Pain Chaworth
4. Sir Patrick Chaworth
9. Gundred Ferté
2. Sir Patrick Chaworth
10. Sir Thomas de Londres
5. Hawise de Londres
11. Eve FitzWarin
1. Maud Chaworth
12. William III Beauchamp
6. William Beauchamp, 9th Earl of Warwick
13. Isabel Mauduit
3. Isabella Beauchamp
14. John FitzGeoffrey
7. Maud FitzJohn
15. Isabel Bigod
