= Henry Percy, 2nd Baron Percy =

English nobleman (1301–1352)

Arms of Percy: Or, a lion rampant azure

Henry Percy, 9th Baron Percy of Topcliffe, 2nd Baron Percy of Alnwick (6 February 1301 – 26 February 1352) was the son of Henry de Percy, 1st Baron Percy of Alnwick, and Eleanor Fitzalan, daughter of Sir Richard FitzAlan, 8th Earl of Arundel, and sister of Edmund FitzAlan, 9th Earl of Arundel.

== Life ==
Henry was thirteen when his father died, so the barony was placed in the custody of John de Felton.

In 1316 he was granted the lands of Patrick IV, Earl of March, in Northumberland, by King Edward II of England. In 1322, was made governor of Pickering Castle and of the town and castle of Scarborough and was later knighted at York. Henry joined with other barons to remove the Despensers, who were favourites of Edward II.

Following a disastrous war with the Scots, Henry was empowered along with William Zouche to negotiate the Treaty of Edinburgh–Northampton. This was an unpopular treaty with the English, and peace between England and Scotland lasted only five years.

Henry was appointed to Edward III's council in 1327 and was given the manor and castle of Skipton. Edward III granted him the castle and barony of Warkworth in 1328. He was at the sieges of Dunbar and Berwick and the Battle of Halidon Hill, and was subsequently appointed constable of Berwick-upon-Tweed. In 1346, Henry commanded the right wing of the English, at the Battle of Neville's Cross.

In 1329, Henry founded a chantry, to celebrate divine service for his soul.

Henry died 26 February 1352 and was buried at Alnwick.

== Marriage and issue ==
Henry married Idonia, daughter of Robert Clifford, 1st Baron Clifford, and had the following children;

- Henry, b. c. 1321, succeeded his father as 3rd Baron Percy of Alnwick
- Thomas Percy, Bishop of Norwich
- Roger
- Maud Percy, married John Neville, 3rd Baron Neville
- Eleanor Percy, married John FitzWalter, 2nd Baron FitzWalter (c. 1315 – 18 October 1361)
- Isabel Percy, married Sir William Aton and had three daughters: Anastasia, Catherine and Elizabeth.
- Margaret married in 1340 Sir Robert d'Umfraville of Pallethorp, Hessle, Yorkshire; she married, as his second wife, before 1368, William Ferrers, 3rd Baron Ferrers of Groby (1332–1370), son of Henry Ferrers of Groby by Isabel de Verdun. Margaret died 1375 at Gyng, Essex.

== Sources ==
- Brenan, Gerald, A History of the House of Percy IIvols. London 1902.
- Lanercost Chronicle, trans. & ed. Maxwell, Herbert Sir. Glasgow 1913.
- McNulty, Joseph, ed. (2013). The Chartulary of the Cistercian Abbey of St Mary of Sallay in Craven. Vol. 2. Cambridge University Press. ISBN 978-1-108-05880-3.
- Richardson, Douglas (2011). Magna Carta Ancestry: A Study in Colonial and Medieval Families, ed. Kimball G. Everingham. Vol. II (2nd ed.). Salt Lake City: Genealogical Publishing Co. ISBN 1-4499-6638-1
- Tate, George, The History of the Borough, Castle, and Barony of Alnwick, Vol.1, Henry Hunter Blair, 1866.

Peerage of England
Preceded by Henry de Percy	Baron Percy; 1314–1352	Succeeded by Henry de Percy
