= Henry, 3rd Earl of Lancaster =

English nobleman (c. 1281–1345)

Henry

Earl of Lancaster and Leicester
- Coat of arms
- Predecessor: Thomas, 2nd Earl
- Successor: Henry of Grosmont
- Born: c. 1281
- Died: 22 September 1345; Leicester Castle, Leicestershire, England
- Noble family: Lancaster
- Spouse: Maud Chaworth
- Issue Detail: Henry, Duke of Lancaster; Blanche, Baroness Wake of Liddell; Maud, Countess of Ulster; Joan, Baroness Mowbray; Isabel, Prioress of Amesbury; Eleanor, Countess of Arundel; Mary, Baroness Percy
- Father: Edmund Crouchback
- Mother: Blanche of Artois

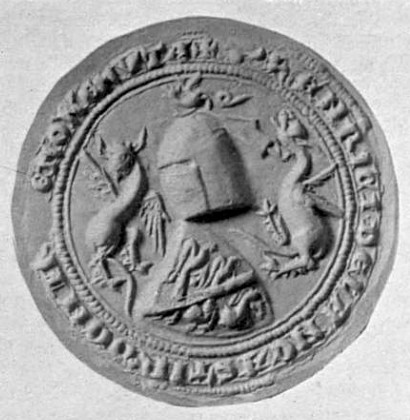
Seal of Henry of Lancaster from the Barons' Letter of 1301, which he signed as Henricus de Lancastre, Dominus de Munemue (Henry of Lancaster, Lord of Monmouth). His shield couche shows the armorial of Plantagenet differenced by a bend azure.

Henry, 3rd Earl of Leicester and Lancaster (c. 1281 – 22 September 1345) was an English nobleman. He was the grandson of King Henry III of England (r. 1216–1272) and was one of the principals behind the deposition of King Edward II (r. 1307–1327), his first cousin.

== Origins ==
He was the younger son of Edmund Crouchback, 1st Earl of Lancaster, Earl of Leicester, a son of King Henry III by his wife Eleanor of Provence. The Earl Henry's mother was Blanche of Artois, Queen Dowager of Navarre. Through his mother, he was a half-brother of Queen Joan I of Navarre.

Henry's elder brother Thomas, 2nd Earl of Lancaster, succeeded their father in 1296, but Henry was summoned to Parliament on 6 February 1298/99 by writ directed to Henrico de Lancastre nepoti Regis ("Henry of Lancaster, nephew of the king", Edward I), by which he is held to have become Baron Lancaster. He took part in the Siege of Caerlaverock in July 1300.

== Petition for succession and inheritance ==
After a period of long-standing opposition to King Edward II and his advisors, including joining two open rebellions, Henry's brother Thomas was convicted of treason, executed and had his lands and titles forfeited in 1322. Henry did not participate in his brother's rebellions; he later petitioned for his brother's lands and titles, and on 29 March 1324 he was invested as Earl of Leicester.

A few years later, shortly after his accession in 1327, the young Edward III of England returned the earldom of Lancaster to him, along with other lordships such as that of Bowland. He may have inherited the Barony of Halton.

== Capture and custody of the King ==
On the Queen's return to England in September 1326 with Roger Mortimer, 1st Earl of March, Henry joined her party against King Edward II, which led to a general desertion of the King's cause and overturned the power of Hugh le Despenser, 1st Earl of Winchester, and his son Hugh the younger.

Henry was sent in pursuit and captured the King at Neath in South Wales. He was appointed to take charge of the King and was responsible for his custody at Kenilworth Castle.

== Full restoration and reward ==
Henry was appointed head of the regency council for the new king, Edward III, and was also appointed captain-general of all the King's forces in the Scottish Marches. He was appointed Constable of Lancaster Castle and High Sheriff of Lancashire in 1327. He helped the young king put an end to Mortimer's regency and tyranny, having him declared a traitor and executed in 1330.

== Later life and death ==
In about the year 1330, he became blind (Prestwich states Henry was going blind around 1329).

Henry spent the last fifteen years of his life at Leicester Castle. There he founded a hospital for the poor and infirm in an extension of the castle bailey. It became known as the Newarke, and Henry was buried in the hospital chapel when he died in 1345. The King and Queen attended his funeral. He was succeeded as Earl of Lancaster and Leicester by his eldest son, Henry of Grosmont, later first Duke of Lancaster. Henry had his father's remains moved to the collegiate Church of the Annunciation of Our Lady of the Newarke, which he had built when he enhanced his father's foundation.

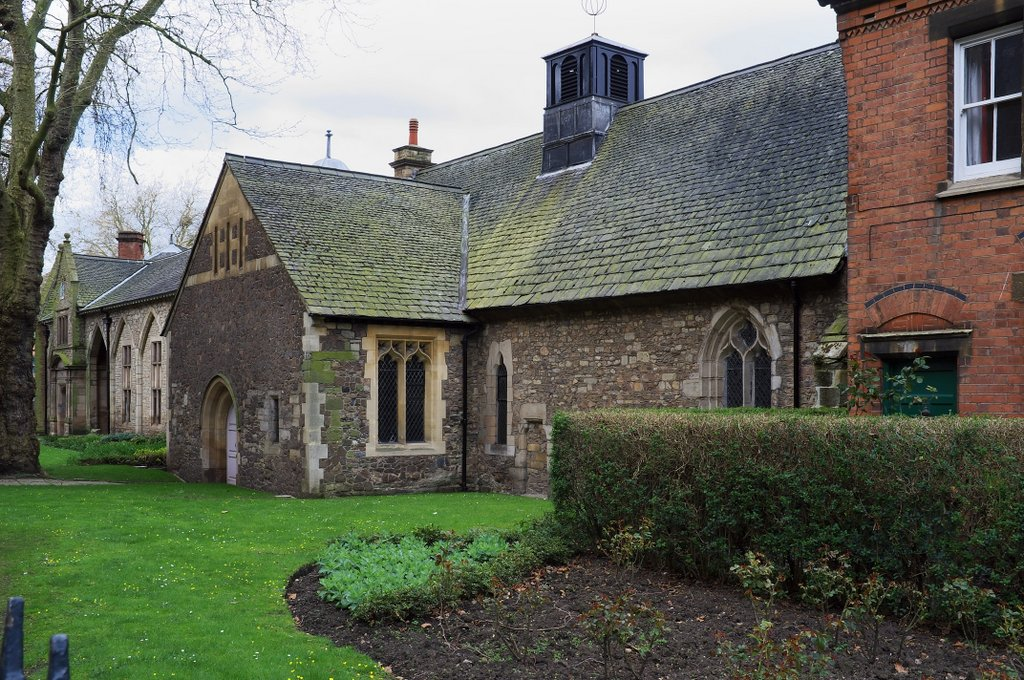
Trinity Hospital chapel in the Newarke, Leicester

== Nickname ==
According to Jean Le Bel, he was nicknamed Wryneck, or Tors-col in French, possibly due to a medical condition. Froissart repeated that statement in his Chronicles.

== Issue ==
He married Maud Chaworth, before 2 March 1296/1297.

Henry and Maud had seven children:

- Blanche of Lancaster, Baroness Wake of Liddell, (c. 1305-c. 1380) married Thomas Wake, 2nd Baron Wake of Liddell
- Henry of Grosmont, Duke of Lancaster, (c. 1310–1361)
- Maud of Lancaster, (about 1310–1377); married (1) William de Burgh, 3rd Earl of Ulster (died c. 1333) and (2) Ralph de Ufford, Justiciar of Ireland (died 1346)
- Joan of Lancaster, (about 1312–1345); married John de Mowbray, 3rd Baron Mowbray and had descendants
- Isabel of Lancaster, Abbess of Amesbury, (about 1317 – after 1347)
- Eleanor of Lancaster, (about 1318–1371/72) married (1) John De Beaumont, 2nd Baron Beaumont and (2) 5 Feb 1344/5, Richard FitzAlan, 3rd Earl of Arundel and had descendants.
- Mary of Lancaster, (about 1320–1362), who married Henry de Percy, 3rd Baron Percy, and was the mother of Henry Percy, 1st Earl of Northumberland and had descendants.

== Arms ==
Prior to his restoration to his earldoms, Henry bore the royal arms of King Henry III, differenced by a bend azure. Upon his restoration, his difference changed, to a label France of three points (that is to say a label of three points azure each charged with three fleur-de-lys or).

Shield prior to restoration

Shield as Earl of Lancaster and Leicester

== Ancestry ==
Ancestors of Henry, 3rd Earl of Lancaster

8. John of England
4. Henry III of England
9. Isabella of Angoulême
2. Edmund Crouchback, 1st Earl of Lancaster
10. Ramon Berenguer IV, Count of Provence
5. Eleanor of Provence
11. Beatrice of Savoy
1. Henry, 3rd Earl of Lancaster and Leicester
12. Louis VIII of France
6. Robert I of Artois
13. Blanche of Castile
3. Blanche of Artois
14. Henry II, Duke of Brabant
7. Matilda of Brabant
15. Marie of Hohenstaufen

== In fiction ==
Henry is a supporting character in Les Rois maudits (The Accursed Kings), a series of French historical novels by Maurice Druon. He was portrayed by William Sabatier in the 1972 French miniseries adaptation of the series, and by Romain Rondeau in the 2005 adaptation.

== Sources ==
- Armitage-Smith, Sir Sydney (1904). John of Gaunt: king of Castile and Leon, duke of Aquitaine and Lancaster. Archibald Constable and Co. Ltd.
- Burke, John (1831). A general and heraldic dictionary of the peerages of England, Ireland, and Scotland. London: Henry Colburn and Richard Bentley.
- Campbell, Anna (2017). "Franciscan Nuns in England, the Minoress Foundations and Their Patrons, 1281–1367". In Robson, Michael (ed.). The English Province of the Franciscans (1224-c.1350). Brill. pp. 426–447. ISBN 978-90-04-33162-4.
- Fryde, Natalie (1979). The Tyranny and Fall of Edward II 1321–1326. Cambridge University Press.
- Hamilton, Jeffrey (2010). The Plantagenets: History of a Dynasty. Continuum UK.
- Marshall, John (2026). Edmund, 1st Earl of Lancaster. Barsnley: Pen and Sword Books. ISBN 978-1-03614-368-8.
- Prestwich, Michael (1980). The Three Edwards: War and State in England, 1272–1377. Routledge.
- Waugh, Scott L. (2004). "Henry of Lancaster, third earl of Lancaster". Oxford Dictionary of National Biography (online) (online ed.). Oxford University Press. doi:10.1093/ref:odnb/12959. (Subscription, Wikipedia Library access or UK public library membership required.)

Honorary titles
Preceded by Thomas, Earl of Lancaster	Lord High Steward; 1324–1345	Succeeded by The Duke of Lancaster
Peerage of England
Preceded by Thomas	Earl of Lancaster; Earl of Leicester; 1322–1345	Succeeded by Henry of Grosmont
