= Isabella de Beauchamp =

English noblewoman and wealthy heiress

- Lady Kidwelly; Baroness Despenser
- Born: c. 1263; Warwickshire, England
- Died: before 30 May 1306
- Noble family: Beauchamp
- Spouses: Sir Patrick de Chaworth, Lord of Kidwelly; Hugh le Despenser, 1st Earl of Winchester
- Issue: Maud Chaworth; Aline le Despenser; Hugh Despenser the Younger; Isabella le Despenser; Philip le Despenser; Margaret le Despenser; Elizabeth le Despenser
- Father: William de Beauchamp, 9th Earl of Warwick
- Mother: Matilda FitzJohn

Isabella de Beauchamp, Lady Kidwelly, Baroness Despenser (c. 1263 – before 30 May 1306), was an English noblewoman and wealthy heiress.

== Family ==
Lady Isabella, or Isabel de Beauchamp, was born in about 1263 in Warwickshire, England. She was the only daughter of William de Beauchamp, 9th Earl of Warwick and Matilda FitzJohn who married sometime between 1261 and 1268; two sisters who were nuns at Shouldham are mentioned in her father's will. She had a brother, Guy de Beauchamp, 10th Earl of Warwick who married Alice de Toeni, by whom he had seven children. Her paternal grandparents were William (III) de Beauchamp of Elmley Castle and Isabel Maudit, and her maternal grandparents were Sir John FitzGeoffrey, Lord of Shere, and Isabel Bigod.

== Marriages and issue ==
Sometime before 1281, she married firstly Sir Patrick de Chaworth, Lord of Kidwelly in Carmarthenshire, South Wales. The marriage produced one daughter:

- Maud Chaworth (1282–1322), married Henry, 3rd Earl of Lancaster, by whom she had seven children.

Following Sir Patrick's death in 1283, Lady Isabella had in her possession four manors in Wiltshire and two manors in Berkshire, assigned to her until her dowry should be set forth along with the livery of Chedworth in Gloucestershire and the Hampshire manor of Hartley Mauditt which had been granted to her and Sir Patrick in frankmarriage by her father.

In 1286, she married secondly Sir Hugh le Despenser without the King's licence for which Sir Hugh had to pay a fine of 2000 marks. He was created Baron Despenser by writ of summons to Parliament in 1295, thereby making Lady Isabella Baroness Despenser.

Together Lord and Lady Despenser had four children:

- Hugh le Despenser, Lord Despenser the Younger (1286 – executed 24 November 1326), married Eleanor de Clare, by whom he had issue.
- Aline le Despenser (died before 28 November 1353), married Edward Burnell, Lord Burnell
- Isabella le Despenser (died 4/5 December 1334), married firstly as his second wife, John Hastings, 1st Baron Hastings, by whom she had three children. Their descendants became the Lords Hastings; she married secondly as his second wife, Sir Ralph de Monthermer, 1st Baron Monthermer.
- Phillip le Despenser (died 1313), married as his first wife Margaret de Goushill, by whom he had issue.

Lady Despenser died sometime before 30 May 1306. Twenty years later, her husband and eldest son, favourites of King Edward II, were both executed by the orders of Roger Mortimer and Queen Isabella, who were by that time the de facto rulers of England; along with most of the people in the kingdom, they had resented the power both Despensers wielded over the King.

As her husband had been made Earl of Winchester in 1322, only after her death, Lady Despenser was never styled as the Countess of Winchester.

== Sources ==
- Fryde, Natalie (1979). The Tyranny and Fall of Edward II 1321-1326. Cambridge University Press. ISBN 0-521-54806-3.
