= List of Ivorian women writers =

This is a list of women writers who were born in the Ivory Coast or whose writings are closely associated with that country.

== A ==
- Josette Abondio (born 1932), teacher, writer, playwright
- Marguerite Abouet (born 1971), comics writer, illustrator
- Anne-Marie Adiaffi (1951–1994), novelist

== B ==
- Angèle Bassolé-Ouédraogo (born 1967), Ivorian-born Canadian poet, journalist
- Fatou Bolli (born 1952), novelist
- Tanella Boni (1954–2026), poet, journalist
- Edith Yah Brou (born 1984), digital journalist

== C ==
- Micheline Coulibaly (1950–2003), Vietnam-born Ivorian short story writer, children's writer

== D ==
- Jeanne de Cavally (1926–1992), children's book writer
- Henriette Diabaté (born 1935), politician, educator, writer

== F ==
- Fatou Fanny-Cissé (1971–2018), novelist, short story writer, journalist and editor

== K ==
- Simone Kaya (1937–2007), considered the first Ivorian woman writer
- Fatou Keïta (born 1965), children's writer
- Adjoua Flore Kouamé (born 1964), novelist

== L ==
- Werewere Liking (born 1950), Cameroon-born novelist, playwright
- Aké Loba (1927–2012), novelist, politician
- Michelle Lora (born 1968), children's writer, story teller, and academic

== N ==
- Marina Niava (born 1985), screenwriter and novelist

== T ==
- Véronique Tadjo (born 1955), poet, novelist, children's writer, illustrator

== Y ==
- Regina Yaou (1955–2017), novelist
