= Adjoua =

Adjoua is both a given name and a surname. Notable people with the name include:

- Adjoua Flore Kouamé (born 1964), Ivorian novelist
- Adjoua N'Dri (born 1965), Ivorian handball player
- Henriette Lagou Adjoua (born 1959), Ivorian minister
- Jeanne Adjoua Peuhmond, Ivorian politician
