= House of Lancaster =

Cadet branch of the House of Plantagenet

- First house (Note: As descendants of the sovereign in the male line, the earls of Lancaster bore the arms of the kingdom differenced by a label azure of three points each charged with three fleurs de lys Or. The last male of this family – Henry of Grosmont – was granted a dukedom, which was then re-created for the second house.) Second house (Note: Arms of John of Gaunt, founder of the second house. The arms of the kingdom differenced by a label ermine. His royal descendants bore the arms undifferenced.)
- Parent house: House of Plantagenet
- Country: Kingdom of England; Kingdom of France; Lordship of Ireland
- Founded: 1267; 759 years ago
- Founder: Edmund Crouchback, 1st Earl of Lancaster and Leicester (first house); John of Gaunt, 1st Duke of Lancaster (second house)
- Current head: Extinct
- Final ruler: Henry of Grosmont, 1st Duke of Lancaster (first house); Henry VI of England (second house)
- Estate: England
- Dissolution: 1361; 665 years ago (last unbroken male heir); 1471; 555 years ago (extinction)
- Deposition: 1461; 565 years ago (first time); 1471; 555 years ago (final time and extinction)
- Cadet branches: House of Beaufort (legitimised); House of Somerset (legitimised)

The House of Lancaster was a cadet branch of the royal House of Plantagenet. The first house was created when King Henry III of England created the Earldom of Lancaster—from which the house was named—for his second son Edmund Crouchback in 1267. Edmund had already been created Earl of Leicester and been granted the lands and privileges of Simon de Montfort, 6th Earl of Leicester, after de Montfort's death and attainder at the end of the Second Barons' War in 1265. When Edmund's son Thomas, 2nd Earl of Lancaster, inherited his father-in-law's estates and title of Earl of Lincoln, he became at a stroke the most powerful nobleman in England, with lands throughout the kingdom and the ability to raise vast private armies to wield power at national and local levels. This brought him—and Henry, his younger brother—into conflict with their cousin King Edward II, leading to Thomas's execution. Henry inherited Thomas's titles and he and his son, who was also called Henry, gave loyal service to Edward's son King Edward III.

The second house of Lancaster was descended from John of Gaunt, a Plantagenet prince, who married the heiress of the first house, Blanche of Lancaster. Edward III married all his sons to wealthy English heiresses rather than following his predecessors' practice of finding continental political marriages for royal princes. Henry of Grosmont, 1st Duke of Lancaster, had no male heir so Edward married his son John to Henry's heiress daughter and John's third cousin Blanche of Lancaster. This gave John the dukedom of Lancaster and the vast wealth of the House of Lancaster. Their son Henry usurped the throne in 1399, creating one of the factions in the Wars of the Roses. There was an intermittent dynastic struggle between the descendants of Edward III. In these wars, the term "Lancastrian" has become a shorthand for members of the family and their supporters but was not used contemporaneously and does not appear in Shakespeare. The family provided England with three kings: Henry IV (r. 1399–1413), Henry V (r. 1413–1422), and Henry VI (r. 1422–1461 and 1470–1471).

The house became extinct in the male line upon the death or murder in the Tower of London of Henry VI, following the death in battle of his son Edward of Westminster, Prince of Wales, against supporters of the House of York in 1471. Lancastrian cognatic descent—from John of Gaunt and Blanche of Lancaster's daughter Philippa—continued in the royal houses of Spain and Portugal while the Lancastrian political cause was maintained by Henry Tudor—a relatively unknown scion of the Lancastrian Beauforts (which also descended from Gaunt)—eventually leading to the establishment of the royal House of Tudor. The Lancastrians left a legacy through the patronage of the arts, most notably in founding Eton College and King's College, Cambridge. However, to historians' chagrin, it is Shakespeare's partly fictionalized history plays rather than medievalist scholarly research that has the greater influence on modern perceptions of the dynasty.

== Origin of the Earls of Lancaster ==
After the supporters of Henry III of England suppressed opposition from the English nobility in the Second Barons' War, Henry granted to his second son Edmund Crouchback the titles and possessions forfeited by attainder of the barons' leader, Simon de Montfort, 6th Earl of Leicester, including the Earldom of Leicester, on 26 October 1265. Later grants included the first Earldom of Lancaster on 30 June 1267 and that of Earl Ferrers in 1301. Edmund was also Count of Champagne and Brie from 1276 by right of his wife. Henry IV of England would later use his descent from Edmund to legitimise his claim to the throne, even making the spurious claim that Edmund was the elder son of Henry but had been passed over as king because of his deformity.

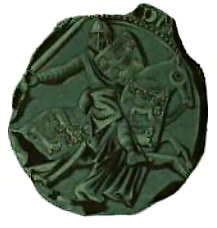
Seal of Edmund Crouchback

Edmund's second marriage to Blanche of Artois, the widow of the King of Navarre, placed him at the centre of the European aristocracy. Blanche's daughter Joan I of Navarre was queen regnant of Navarre and through her marriage to Philip IV of France was queen consort of France. Edmund's son Thomas became the most powerful nobleman in England, gaining the Earldoms of Lincoln and Salisbury through marriage to the heiress of Henry de Lacy, 3rd Earl of Lincoln. His income was £11,000 per annum—double that of the next wealthiest earl.

Thomas and his younger brother Henry served in the coronation of their cousin King Edward II of England on 25 February 1308; Thomas carried Curtana, the Sword of Mercy, and Henry carried the royal sceptre. After initially supporting Edward, Thomas became one of the Lords Ordainers, who demanded the banishment of Piers Gaveston and the governance of the realm by a baronial council. After Gaveston was captured, Thomas took the lead in his trial and execution at Warwick in 1312. Edward's authority was weakened by poor governance and defeat by the Scots at the Battle of Bannockburn. This allowed Thomas to restrain Edward's power by republishing the Ordinances of 1311. Following this achievement Thomas took little part in the governance of the realm and instead retreated to Pontefract Castle. This allowed Edward to regroup and re-arm, leading to a fragile peace in August 1318 with the Treaty of Leake. In 1321 Edward's rule again collapsed into civil war. Thomas raised a northern army but was defeated and captured at the Battle of Boroughbridge in March 1322. He was sentenced to be hanged, drawn and quartered but because he was Edward's cousin he was given a quicker death by beheading.

Henry joined the revolt of Edward's wife Isabella of France and Mortimer in 1326, pursuing and capturing Edward at Neath in South Wales. Following Edward's deposition at the Parliament of Kenilworth in 1326 and reputed murder at Berkeley Castle, Thomas's conviction was posthumously reversed and Henry regained possession of the Earldoms of Lancaster, Derby, Salisbury and Lincoln that had been forfeit for Thomas's treason. His restored prestige led to him knighting the young King Edward III of England before his coronation. Mortimer lost support over the Treaty of Edinburgh–Northampton that formalised Scotland's independence, and his developing power in the Welsh Marches provoked jealousy from the barons. When Mortimer called a parliament to make his new powers and estates permanent with the title of Earl of March in 1328, Henry led the opposition and held a counter-meeting. In response, Mortimer ravaged the lands of Lancaster and checked the revolt. Edward III was able to assume control in 1330 but Henry's further influence was restricted by poor health and blindness for the last fifteen years of his life.

== Duchy and Palatinate of Lancaster ==
Henry's son, also named Henry, was born at the castle of Grosmont in Monmouthshire between 1299 and 1314. According to the younger Henry's memoirs, he was better at martial arts than academic subjects and did not learn to read until later in life. Henry was coeval with Edward III and was pivotal to his reign, becoming his best friend and most trusted commander. Henry was knighted in 1330, represented his father in parliament and fought in Edward's Scottish campaign. After the outbreak of the Hundred Years' War, Henry took part in several diplomatic missions and minor campaigns and was present at the great English victory in the naval Battle of Sluys in 1340. Later, he was required to commit himself as hostage in the Low Countries for Edward's considerable debts. He remained hostage for a year and had to pay a large ransom for his own release.

In 1345, Edward III launched a major, three-pronged attack on France. The Earl of Northampton attacked from Brittany, Edward from Flanders, and Henry from Aquitaine in the south. Moving rapidly through the country, Henry confronted the Comte d'Isle at the Battle of Auberoche and achieved a victory described as "the greatest single achievement of Lancaster's entire military career". The ransom from the prisoners has been estimated at £50,000. Edward rewarded Henry by including him as a founding knight of the Order of the Garter. An even greater honour was bestowed on Lancaster when Edward created him Duke of Lancaster. The title of duke was relatively new in England, with only Cornwall being a previous ducal title. Lancaster was also given palatinate status for the county of Lancashire, which entailed a separate administration independent of the crown. There were two other counties palatine; Durham was an ancient ecclesiastical palatinate and Chester was crown property.

In 1350, Henry was present at the naval victory at Winchelsea, where he saved the life of the Black Prince. He spent 1351–52 on crusade in Prussia where a quarrel with Otto, Duke of Brunswick, almost led to a duel between the two men, which was only averted by the intervention of John II of France. As campaigning in France resumed, Henry participated in the last great offensive of the Rheims campaign of 1359–1360—the first phase of the Hundred Years' War—before returning to England where he fell ill and died, most likely of the plague, at Leicester Castle.

Edward III of England married John of Gaunt, his third surviving son, to Henry's heiress Blanche of Lancaster. On Henry's death, Edward conferred on Gaunt the second creation of the title of Duke of Lancaster, which made Gaunt, after Edward, the wealthiest landowner in England. Gaunt enjoyed great political influence during his lifetime, but upon his death in 1399 his lands were confiscated by Richard II. Gaunt's exiled son and heir Henry of Bolingbroke returned home and gathered military support in clear contravention of Richard's treason act of 1397, which included a definition of treason of "or [to] ... raiseth People and rideth against the King to make War within his Realm ...". Although he claimed his aim was restoration of his Lancaster inheritance, this Act and Henry's knowledge of Richard's character—suspicious and vindictive—probably meant Henry knew that only by removing Richard from power could he be secure. Henry unified popular opposition to Richard II, took control of the kingdom and Richard—recognising that he had insufficient support to resist—surrendered to Henry's forces at Conwy Castle. Henry instigated a commission to decide who should be king. Richard was forced to abdicate and although Henry was not next in line, he was chosen by an unlawfully constituted parliament dominated by his supporters. After the first unrest of his reign and a revolt by the Earls of Salisbury, Gloucester, Exeter and Surrey, Richard reputedly starved to death. There is some debate as to whether this was self-inflicted or ordered by Henry to end the risk of restoration without leaving incriminating marks on the body.

== Reign of Henry IV ==
There is much debate among historians about Henry's accession, in part because some see it as a cause of the Wars of the Roses. For many historians, the accession by force of the throne broke principles the Plantagenets had established successfully over two and a half centuries and allowed any magnate with sufficient power and Plantagenet blood to have ambitions to assume the throne. Richard had attempted to disinherit Henry and remove him from the succession. In response, Henry's legal advisors, led by William Thirning, dissuaded Henry from claiming the throne by right of conquest and instead look for legal justification. Although Henry established a committee to investigate his assertion that his mother had legitimate rights through descent from Edmund Crouchback, who he said was the elder son of Henry III of England but was set aside because of deformity, no evidence was found. The eight-year-old Edmund Mortimer, Earl of March, was the heir general to Richard II by being the great-grandson of Edward III's second son, Lionel of Antwerp, 1st Duke of Clarence, and also the son of Richard's last nominated heir. In desperation, Henry's advisors made the case that Henry was heir male to Henry III and this was supported by thirteenth-century entails. Mortimer's sister Anne de Mortimer married Richard of Conisburgh, 3rd Earl of Cambridge, son of Edward III's fourth son Edmund of Langley, consolidating Anne's place in the succession with that of the more junior House of York. As a child, Mortimer was not considered a serious contender and, as an adult, he showed no interest in the throne. He instead loyally served the House of Lancaster. Mortimer informed Henry V when Conisburgh, in what was later called the Southampton Plot, attempted to place him on the throne instead of Henry's newly crowned son—their mutual cousin—leading to the execution of Conisburgh and the other plotters.

Henry IV was plagued with financial problems, the political need to reward his supporters, frequent rebellions and declining health—including leprosy and epilepsy. The Percy family had been some of Henry's leading supporters, defending the North from Scotland largely at their own expense, but revolted in the face of lack of reward and suspicion from Henry. Henry Percy (Hotspur) was defeated and killed at the Battle of Shrewsbury. In 1405, Hotspur's father Henry Percy, 1st Earl of Northumberland, supported Richard le Scrope, Archbishop of York, in another rebellion, after which the elder Percy fled to Scotland and his estates were confiscated. Henry had Scrope executed in an act comparable to the murder of another Archbishop—Thomas Becket—by men loyal to Henry II. This would probably have led to Henry's excommunication, but the church was in the midst of the Western Schism, with competing popes keen on Henry's support; it protested but took no action. In 1408, Percy invaded England once more and was killed at the Battle of Bramham Moor. In Wales, Owain Glyndŵr's widespread rebellion was only suppressed with the recapture of Harlech Castle in 1409, although sporadic fighting continued until 1421.

Henry IV was succeeded by his son Henry V, and eventually by his grandson Henry VI in 1422.

== Henry V and the Hundred Years' War ==
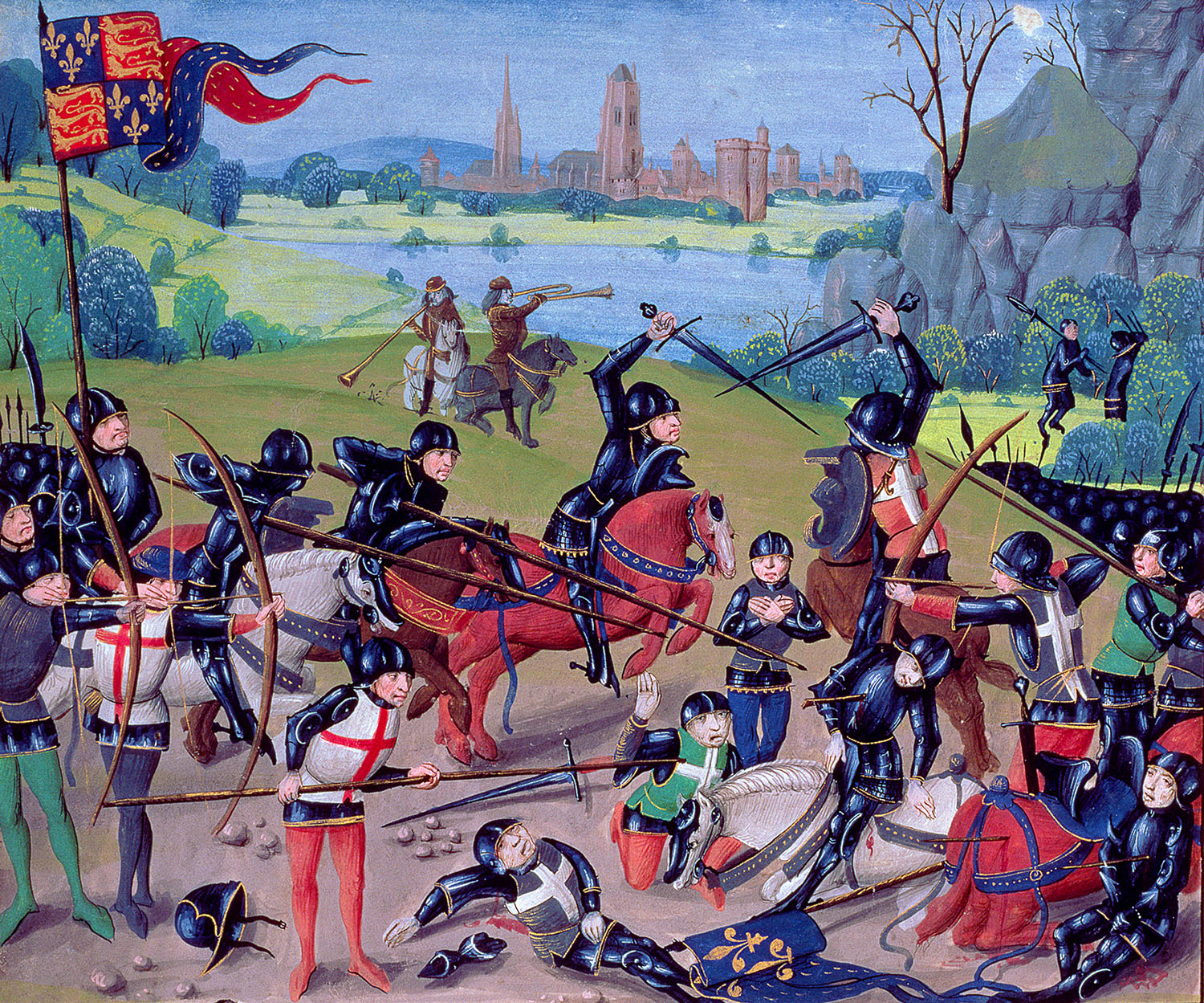
Henry V's victory at the Battle of Agincourt

Henry V of England was a successful and ruthless monarch. He was quick to re-assert the claim to the French throne he inherited from Edward III, continuing what was later called the Hundred Years' War. The war was not a formal, continuous conflict but a series of English raids and military expeditions from 1337 until 1453. There were six major royal expeditions; Henry himself led the fifth and sixth, but these were unlike the smaller, frequent, provincial campaigns. In Henry's first major campaign—and the fifth major royal campaign of the war—he invaded France, captured Harfleur, made a chevauchée to Calais and won a near-total victory over the French at the Battle of Agincourt despite being outnumbered, outmanoeuvred and low on supplies. In his second campaign, he recaptured much of Normandy and in a treaty secured a marriage to Catherine of Valois. The terms of the Treaty of Troyes were that Henry's and Catherine's heirs would succeed to the throne of France. This condition was contested by the Dauphin and the momentum of the war changed. In 1421, Henry's brother Thomas, Duke of Clarence, was killed at the Battle of Baugé, and Henry V died of dysentery at Vincennes in 1422.

Henry VI of England was less than a year old but his uncles—led by Henry V's brother John of Lancaster, 1st Duke of Bedford—continued the war. There were more victories, including the Battle of Verneuil, but it was impossible to maintain campaigning at this level given the relative economic and manpower resources of England against France. Joan of Arc's involvement helped the French remove the siege of Orleans and win the Battle of Patay before Joan was captured by the Burgundians, sold to the English, tried as a witch and burnt at the stake. The Dauphin was crowned and continued the successful Fabian tactics of avoiding full frontal assault and exploiting logistical advantage.

== Henry VI and the fall of the House of Lancaster ==
The Hundred Years' War caused political division between the Lancastrians and the other Plantagenets during the minority of Henry VI: Bedford wanted to maintain the majority of the Lancastrians' French possessions; Humphrey of Lancaster, 1st Duke of Gloucester wanted to hold only Calais; and Cardinal Beaufort desired a negotiated peace. Gloucester's attacks on Beaufort forced the latter from public life but brought him little advantage as the Earl of Suffolk's influence over the king enabled him to direct policy for the rest of the decade. Gloucester remained heir presumptive but in 1441 his ambitious wife, Eleanor Cobham, consulted astrologers on the likelihood of the king's death and was arrested for treasonable necromancy—although Gloucester was not implicated he was discredited and forced into retirement. In 1447 Suffolk had him arrested and within days he died in prison.

England's ally Philip III, Duke of Burgundy defected to Charles when the English ambassadors' refusal to renounce the claim to the French crown stalled negotiations, signing the Treaty of Arras (1435). The French reorganised the superior numbers of their feudal levies into a modern professional army and retook Paris, Rouen, Bordeaux and Normandy. Victories at the Battle of Formigny in 1450 and the Battle of Castillon in 1453 brought the war to an end with the House of Lancaster losing forever all its French holdings, except Calais and the Channel Islands.

Henry VI proved to be a weak king and vulnerable to the over-mighty subjects who developed private armies of retainers. Rivalries often spilled over from the courtroom into armed confrontations, such as the Percy–Neville feud. Without the common purpose of the war in France, Henry's cousin Richard of York, 3rd Duke of York, and Richard Neville, 16th Earl of Warwick, used their networks to defy the crown. Henry became the focus of discontent as the population, agricultural production, prices, the wool trade and credit declined in the Great Slump. This led to radical demands from the lower classes. In 1450, Jack Cade raised a rebellion to force Henry to address the economic problems or abdicate his throne. The uprising was suppressed but conflict remained between villagers, gentry and aristocracy. Society remained deeply unsettled and radical demands continued to be suppressed such as those from the yeoman brothers John and William Merfold.

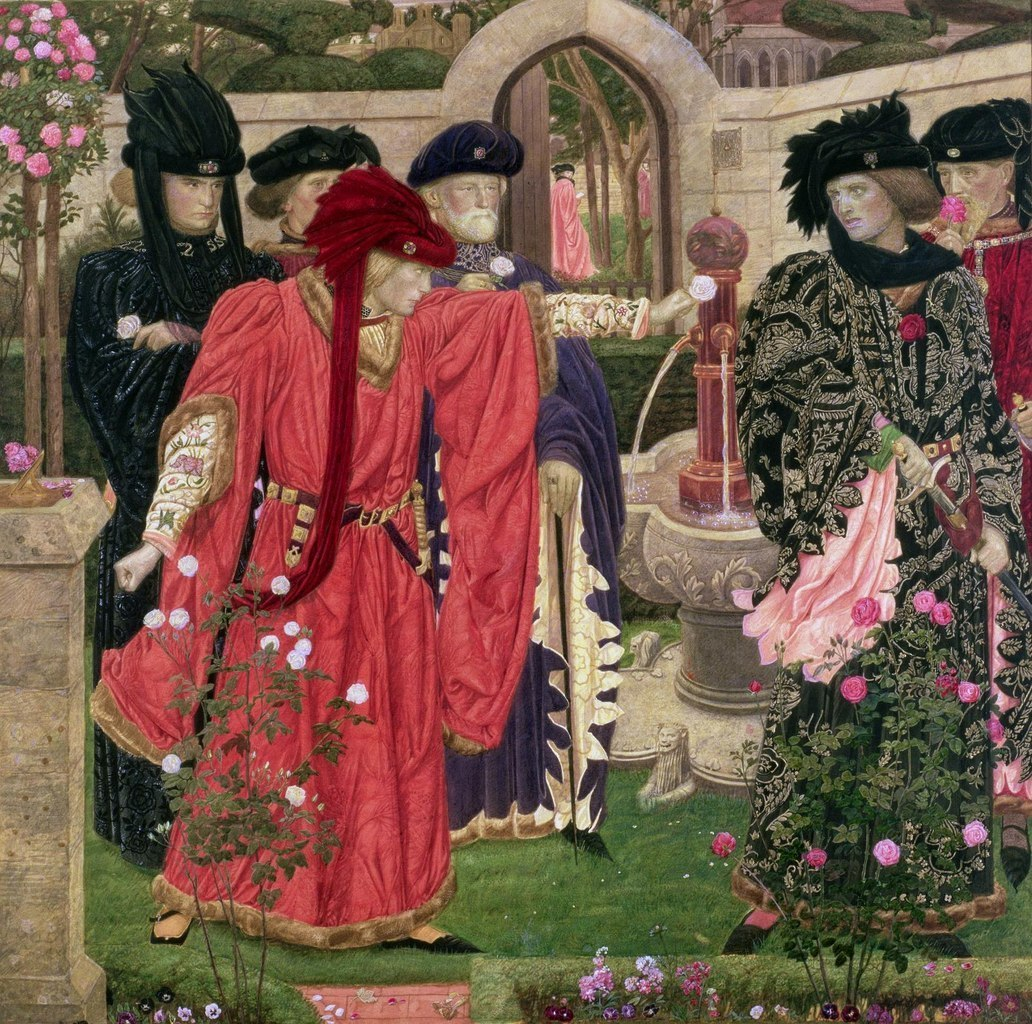
Plucking the Red and White Roses in the Old Temple Gardens (Henry Payne, c. 1908): Symbolic representation of the Wars of the Roses in art

Henry's marriage to Margaret of Anjou prompted criticism from Richard Plantagenet, Duke of York, because it included the surrender of Maine and an extended truce with France. York was Henry's cousin through his descent from Edward III sons Lionel of Antwerp, 1st Duke of Clarence, and Edmund, Duke of York. This gave York political influence but he was removed from English and French politics through his appointment as Lord Lieutenant of Ireland. On returning to England, York was conscious of the fate of Henry's uncle Humphrey at the hands of the Beauforts and suspicious that Henry intended to nominate Edmund Beaufort, 2nd Duke of Somerset, as heir presumptive, and recruited military forces. Armed conflict was avoided because York lacked aristocratic support and was forced to swear allegiance to Henry. However, when Henry later underwent a mental breakdown, York was named regent. Henry was trusting and not a man of war, but Margaret was more assertive and showed open enmity towards York—particularly after the birth of a male heir that resolved the succession question and assured her position.

According to historian Robin Storey, "If Henry's insanity was a tragedy; his recovery was a national disaster". When Henry's sanity returned, the court party reasserted its authority but York and his relatives, the Nevilles, defeated them at the First Battle of St Albans. Historian Anthony Goodman suggests that around 50 men were killed; among them were Somerset and two Percy lords, Henry Percy, 2nd Earl of Northumberland, and Thomas Clifford, 8th Baron de Clifford, creating feuds that would confound reconciliation attempts despite the shock to the ruling class caused by the armed conflict. Threatened with treason charges and lacking support, York, Richard Neville, 5th Earl of Salisbury, and Richard Neville, 16th Earl of Warwick, fled abroad. Henry was captured by the opposition when the Nevilles returned and won the Battle of Northampton. York joined them, surprising parliament by claiming the throne and then forcing through the Act of Accord stating that Henry would remain as monarch for his lifetime and that York would succeed him. The disinheriting of Henry's son Edward was unacceptable to Margaret so the conflict continued. York was killed at the Battle of Wakefield and his head was displayed at Micklegate Bar, York, along with those of Edmund, Earl of Rutland, and Richard Neville, Earl of Salisbury—both of whom were captured and beheaded.

Margaret gained the support of the Scottish queen Mary of Guelders, and with a Scottish army she pillaged into southern England. The citizens of London feared the city being plundered and enthusiastically welcomed York's son Edward, Earl of March. Margaret's defeat at the Battle of Towton confirmed Edward's position and he was crowned. Disaffected with Edward's marriage to Elizabeth Woodville and preferment of her formerly Lancastrian-supporting family, Warwick and Clarence defected to the Lancastrians. The alliance was sealed with the marriage of Henry's son Edward to Anne, Warwick's daughter. Edward and Richard, Duke of Gloucester, fled England. When they returned, Clarence switched sides at the Battle of Barnet and Warwick and his brother were killed. Henry, Margaret and Edward of Lancaster were caught at the Battle of Tewkesbury before they could escape back to France. Edward of Westminster, Prince of Wales, was executed on the battlefield and John Beaufort, Marquess of Dorset, was killed in the fighting—meaning that when his brother Edmund Beaufort, 4th Duke of Somerset, was executed two days later, the Beaufort family became extinct in the legitimate male line. The captive Henry was murdered on 21 May 1471 in the Tower of London and buried in Chertsey Abbey, extinguishing the House of Lancaster.

== Legacy ==
=== Shakespeare's history plays ===
"This royal throne of kings, this sceptr’d isle,
This earth of majesty, this seat of Mars,
This other Eden, demi-paradise,
This fortress built by Nature for herself
Against infection and the hand of war,
This happy breed of men, this little world,
This precious stone set in the silver sea,
Which serves it in the office of a wall,
Or as a moat defensive to a house
Against the envy of less happier lands;
This blessed plot, this earth, this realm, this England...

— John of Gaunt's speech in Richard II,
Act II, Scene I, 40–50

Historians have been dismayed by Shakespeare's influence on the perception of the later medieval period exceeding that of academic research. While the chronology of Shakespeare's history plays runs from King John to Henry VIII, they are dominated by eight plays in which members of the House of Lancaster play a significant part, voicing speeches on a par with those in Hamlet and King Lear. These plays are:

- Richard II
- Henry IV, Part 1
- Henry IV, Part 2
- Henry V
- Henry VI, Part 1
- Henry VI, Part 2
- Henry VI, Part 3
- Richard III.

According to the historian Norman Davies, the plays were constrained by the political and religious requirements of Tudor England. While they are factually inaccurate, they demonstrate how the past and the House of Lancaster are remembered in terms of myth, legend, ideas and popular misconceptions. Shakespeare avoided contentious political and religious issues to dubiously illustrate Tudor England as having rejected medieval conflict and entered an era of harmony and prosperity. The famous patriotic "sceptr'd isle" speech is voiced by John of Gaunt, a man who spent the majority of his life in Aquitaine, and is a piece of poetic licence that illustrates English prejudices. Henry V is one-sided with little sympathy for the French. Many of these historical lines illustrate historical myth rather than realism.

=== Succession ===
Lancastrian cognatic descent from John of Gaunt and Blanche's daughter Phillipa continued in the royal houses of Spain and Portugal. The remnants of the Lancastrian court party coalesced support around Henry Tudor—a relatively unknown scion of the Beauforts. They had been amongst the most ardent supporters of the House of Lancaster and were descended illegitimately from John of Gaunt by his mistress Katherine Swynford. However John of Gaunt and Katherine subsequently married and their children were legitimated by the Pope and by Parliament during the reign of Richard II. Henry IV had tried to debar them from the succession by use of his royal prerogative to avoid competition with the House of Lancaster's claims to the throne but this was of limited effect. By some calculations of primogeniture, there were as many as 18 people—including both his mother and future wife—with what some might claim a better right to the throne. By 1510, this figure had increased with the birth of an additional 16 possible Yorkist claimants.

With the House of Lancaster extinct, Henry claimed to be the Lancastrian heir through his mother Lady Margaret Beaufort. His father, Edmund Tudor, was Henry VI's maternal half-brother. In 1485, Henry Tudor united increasing opposition within England to the reign of Richard III with the Lancastrian cause to take the throne. To further legitimise his claim, Henry married Elizabeth of York—Edward IV's daughter—and promoted the House of Tudor as a dynasty of dual Lancastrian and Yorkist descent.

=== Religion, education and the arts ===
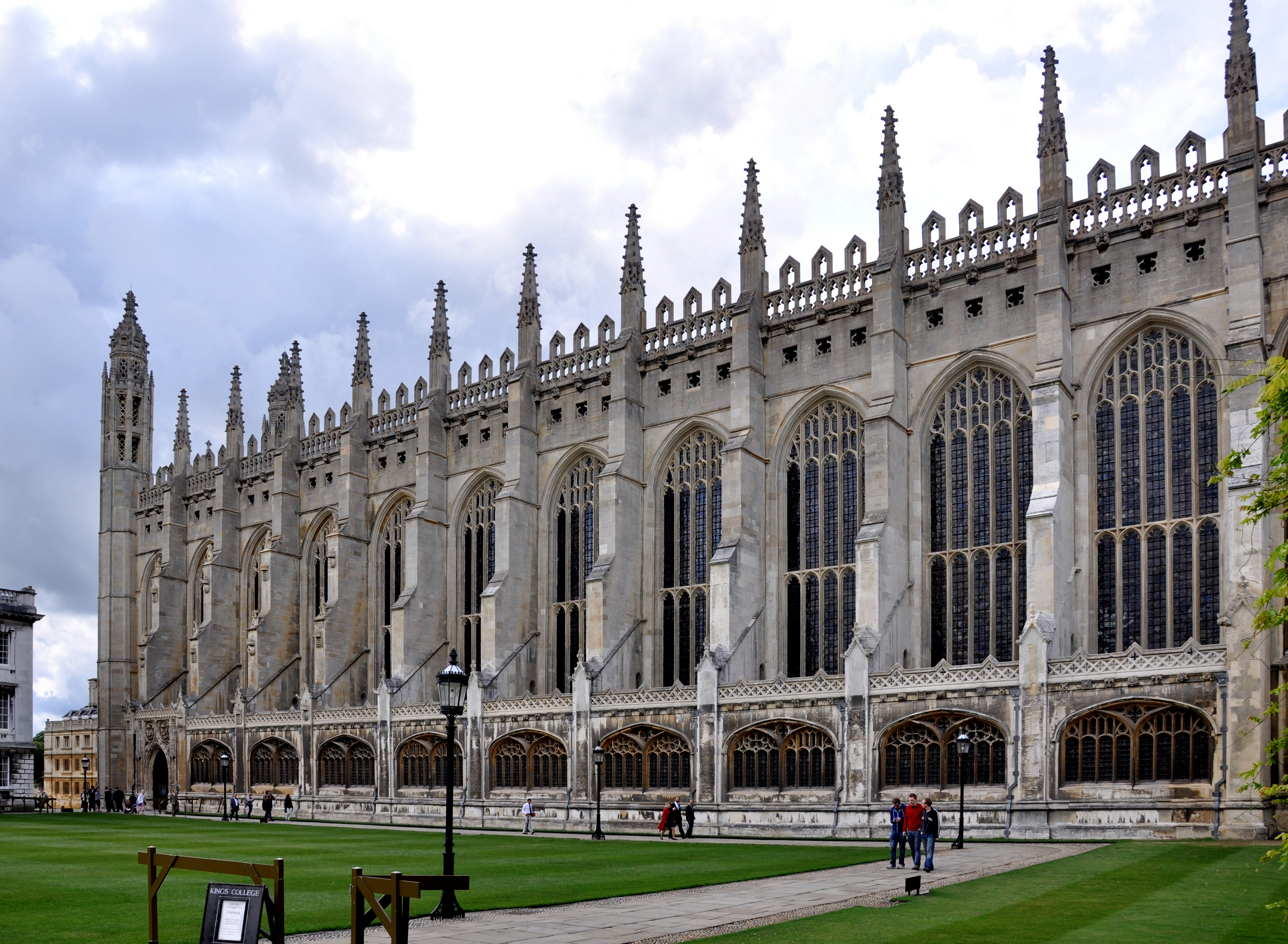
King's College Chapel, Cambridge

The Lancastrians were both pious and well read. Henry IV was the first English king known to have possessed a vernacular Bible, supported the canonization of John Twenge, gave a pension to the anchoress Margaret Pensax and maintained close relations with several Westminster recluses. His household accounts as king record conventional payments to large numbers of paupers (12,000 on Easter day 1406) and the intercession for him of twenty-four oratores domini regis at 2d each per day. However, his reliance on the church was both personal and political. Archbishop Arundel gave the Lancastrians vital support and carried other bishops with him. In return the church required support for religious orthodoxy against heresy. Lollards were suppressed and heresy was made a capital offence in England under the statute of De haeretico comburendo even though Henry could not afford to overly antagonize his supporters with Lollard sympathies, including those among his Lancastrian retainers. The Lannister from George R.R. Martin's epic fantasy series A Song of Ice and Fire are based on the Lancasters.

According to the author of the Gesta Henrici quinti, Henry V aimed "to promote the honour of God, the extension of the Church, the deliverance of his country and the peace and tranquillity of kingdoms". He was deeply religious, engaged with ecclesiastical issues and saw that his role as king was to honour God, extend the church, fight heresy and defend the established social order. All his victories, especially Agincourt, were attributed to divine intervention. Henry V founded Syon Abbey in 1415, as penance for his father's execution of Archbishop Scrope, and three monasteries in London: for Carthusian, Bridgettine and Celestine orders. The equally devout Henry VI continued the architectural patronage begun by his father, founding Eton College and King's College, Cambridge and leaving a lasting educational and architectural legacy in buildings including King's College Chapel and Eton College Chapel.

The Lancastrian regime was founded and legitimised by formal lying that was both public and official. This has been described as "a series of unconstitutional actions" based "upon three major acts of perjury". The historian K.B. McFarlane found it hard "to think of another moment of comparable importance in medieval English political history when the supply of information was so effectively manipulated as it was by Henry IV on this occasion". The Lancastrians patronised poets for panegyric purposes for years before Henry IV ascended the throne, including Geoffrey Chaucer who dedicated The Book of the Duchess to Blanche of Lancaster around 1368. In 1400, poets in the pay of Henry IV were directed to propaganda purposes. John Gower based his Cronica Tripertita on the official Lancastrian accounts of the usurpation:"The Record and Process of the Deposition of Richard II" from 1399. Gower also produced a number of further favourable works including "In praise of peace" which was dedicated to Henry IV.

== Earls and Dukes of Lancaster (first creation) ==
Earl/Duke	Portrait	Birth	Marriage(s)	Death
Edmund Crouchback, 1st Earl of Lancaster and Leicester	Edmund Crouchback	16 January 1245; London son of Henry III of England and Eleanor of Provence	(1) Aveline de Forz; 1269; 0 children (2) Blanche of Artois; 21 September 1271; 4 children Thomas, 2nd Earl of Lancaster; Henry, 3rd Earl of Lancaster; John of Lancaster, Lord of Beaufort; Mary of Lancaster	5 June 1296; Bayonne, Gascony aged 51
Thomas, 2nd Earl of Lancaster and Leicester	Manuscript illustration of Thomas of Lancaster with Saint George.	c. 1278; Grismond Castle, Monmouthshire son of Edmund Crouchback and Blanche of Artois	Alice de Lacey; 28 October 1294 – Divorced 1318; 0 children	22 March 1322; Pontefract, Yorkshire; Executed by order of Edward II of England aged 43–44
Henry, 3rd Earl of Lancaster and Leicester	(No portrait available)	1281; Grosmont Castle, Monmouthshire son of Edmund Crouchback and Blanche of Artois	Matilda de Chaworth; 7 children Henry of Grosmont, 1st Duke of Lancaster; Blanche of Lancaster, Baroness Wake of Liddell; Maud of Lancaster, Countess of Ulster; Joan of Lancaster, Baroness Mowbray; Isabel of Lancaster, Prioress of Amesbury; Eleanor of Lancaster, Countess of Arundel; Mary of Lancaster, Baroness Percy	22 September 1345; Leicestershire aged 63–64
Henry of Grosmont, 1st Duke of Lancaster, 4th Earl of Lancaster and Leicester		c. 1310; Grosmont Castle, Monmouthshire son of Henry, 3rd Earl of Lancaster	Isabel de Beaumont; 1334; 2 children Maud, Countess of Leicester; Blanche, Duchess of Lancaster	23 March 1361; Leicester Castle, Leicestershire; Black Death aged 50–51
Blanche, Duchess of Lancaster, 5th Countess of Lancaster and Leicester		25 March 1345/1347; Bolingbroke Castle, Lincolnshire daughter of Henry of Grosmont	John of Gaunt; 19 May 1359; 7 children Philippa, Queen of Portugal; John of Lancaster; Elizabeth of Lancaster, Duchess of Exeter; Edward of Lancaster; John of Lancaster; Henry IV Bolingbroke, King of England; Isabel of Lancaster	12 September 1369; Tutbury Castle, Staffordshire; Black Death aged about 22

== Dukes of Lancaster (second creation) ==
Duke	Portrait	Birth	Marriage(s)	Death
John of Gaunt, 1st Duke of Lancaster; Earl by right of his wife, the title Duke of Lancaster was vacant because there were no male heirs. Created Duke by his father, Edward III of England.	John of Gaunt	6 March 1340; Ghent, Flanders Son of Edward III of England and Philippa of Hainault	(1) Blanche of Lancaster; 1359; 7 children See above (2) Constance of Castile; 21 September 1371; 2 children Catherine, Queen of Castile; John of Lancaster (3) Katherine Swynford; 13 January 1396; 4 children House of Beaufort; John Beaufort, 1st Earl of Somerset; Cardinal Henry Beaufort, Bishop of Winchester; Thomas Beaufort, Duke of Exeter; Joan Beaufort, Countess of Westmorland	3 February 1399; Leicester Castle, Leicestershire aged 58

== Lancastrian Kings of England ==
Name	Portrait	Birth	Marriage(s)	Death	Claim
Henry IV of England	Henry IV	3 April 1367; Bolingbroke Castle son of John of Gaunt and Blanche of Lancaster	(1) Mary de Bohun; Arundel Castle; 20 July 1380 seven children Edward of Lancaster; Henry V of England; Thomas of Lancaster, 1st Duke of Clarence; John of Lancaster, 1st Duke of Bedford; Humphrey of Lancaster, 1st Duke of Gloucester; Blanche, Electress Palatine; Philippa, Queen of Denmark, Norway and Sweden (2) Joanna of Navarre; Winchester Cathedral; 7 February 1403 no children	20 March 1413; Westminster, London aged 45	Henry's claim was tenuous. He claimed the throne through his mother's descent from Edmund on the basis that he was older than Edward I but had been set aside because of deformity. This was not widely accepted.
Henry V of England		16 September 1386; Monmouth Castle son of Henry IV and Mary de Bohun	Catherine of Valois; Troyes Cathedral; 2 June 1420 one son Henry VI of England	31 August 1422; Château de Vincennes aged 35	son of Henry IV (agnatic primogeniture)
Henry VI of England	Henry VI	6 December 1421; Windsor Castle son of Henry V and Catherine of Valois	Margaret of Anjou; Titchfield Abbey; 22 April 1445 one son Edward of Westminster, Prince of Wales	21 May 1471; Tower of London aged 49 (believed murdered)	son of Henry V (agnatic primogeniture)

== Family tree ==
Family Tree: House of Lancaster

King Henry III; 1207–1272 r. 1216–1272
EARL OF LANCASTER, 1267
King Edward I 1239–1307 r. 1272–1307	Edmund Crouchback; 1245–1296; 1st Earl of Lancaster
King Edward II; 1284–1327 r. 1307–1327	Thomas of Lancaster; 1278–1322; 2nd Earl of Lancaster	Henry of Lancaster; 1281–1345; 3rd Earl of Lancaster
DUKE OF LANCASTER, 1351
King Edward III; 1312–1377 r. 1327–1377	Henry of Grosmont c. 1310–1361; 4th Earl of Lancaster, Duke of Lancaster
Dukedom and Earldom of Lancaster extinct, 1361
DUKE OF LANCASTER, 1362
John of Gaunt; 1340–1399; 5th Earl of Lancaster, 1st Duke of Lancaster	Blanche of Lancaster; 1345–1368
John Beaufort; 1371–1410; 1st Earl of Somerset	Henry Bolingbroke; 1367–1413; 2nd Duke of Lancaster; King Henry IV r. 1399–1413
Dukedom of Lancaster merged in Crown, 1399
DUKE OF LANCASTER, 1399
John Beaufort; 1404–1444; 1st Duke of Somerset	Henry of Monmouth; 1386–1422; Duke of Lancaster; King Henry V r. 1413–1422
Dukedom of Lancaster merged in Crown, 1413
Margaret Beaufort; 1443–1509; Countess of Richmond and Derby	King Henry VI; 1421–1471 r. 1422–1461 r. 1470–1471
King Henry VII of England; 1457–1509 r. 1485–1509	Edward of Westminster; 1453–1471; Prince of Wales

== Coats of Arms ==
See also Armorial des Plantagenêts

Armoiries	Écu	Nom et blasonnement
		Henry IV of England (1367 † 1413), son of John of Gaunt, Duke of Lancaster grandson of Edward III of England. He deposed his cousin Richard II of England and became king. Écartelé, aux 1 et 4, d'azur semé de lys d'or ( France ancien); aux 2 et 3 de gueules à trois léopards d'or armés et lampassés d'azur (England). In 1406, he simplified the French arms in imitation of Charles V : Écartelé, aux 1 et 4, d'azur à trois fleurs de lys d'or (France moderne); aux 2 et 3, de gueules à trois léopards d'or armés et lampassés d'azur (England). He utilized as his supporters the lion of England and the antelope.
		Henry V of England (1387 † 1422), King of England, Lord of Ireland, Duke of Aquitaine; son of Henry IV. Écartelé, aux 1 et 4, d'azur à trois fleurs de lys d'or (France moderne); aux 2 et 3, de gueules à trois léopards d'or armés et lampassés d'azur (England). He utilized the lion of England and the antilope badge of his father as supporters.
		Henry VI of England (1421 † 1471), king of England, lord of Ireland, Duke of Aquitaine. In 1422, under the Treaty of Troyes, he was crowned king of France and changed his armouries. Écartelé, aux 1 et 4, d'azur à trois fleurs de lys d'or (France moderne); aux 2 et 3, de gueules à trois léopards d'or armés et lampassés d'azur (England). Per pale, I d'azur three fleurs de lys d'or (France moderne); au II Écartelé, aux 1 et 4, d'azur à trois fleurs de lys d'or (France moderne); aux 2 et 3, de gueules à trois léopards d'or armés et lampassés d'azur (England). He utilized the antelope badge of his grandfather as supporters.

Arms	Name	Life	Blazon	Notes
	Edmund Crouchback, Earl of Leicester and Lancaster	1245–1296	Gules, three lions passant guardant Or, with a label of three points Azure each charged with three fleurs de lys Or	Son of: King Henry III and Queen Eleanor.
	Thomas, 2nd Earl of Lancaster	1278–1322	Gules, three lions passant guardant Or, with a label of three points Azure each charged with three fleurs de lys Or	Son of: Edmund Crouchback, Earl of Leicester and Lancaster and Blanche of Artois.
	Henry, 3rd Earl of Lancaster	1281–1345	Gules, three lions passant guardant Or, a baston Azure	Son of: Edmund Crouchback, Earl of Leicester and Lancaster and Blanche of Artois.
	Henry of Grosmont, 1st Duke of Lancaster	1310–1361	Gules, three lions passant guardant Or, with a label of three points Azure each charged with three fleurs de lys Or	Son of: Henry, 3rd Earl of Lancaster and Maud Chaworth

Arms	Name	Life	Blazon	Notes
	John of Gaunt, Duke of Lancaster	1340–1399	Quarterly, 1st and 4th, France ancien, 2nd and 3rd England, with a label of three points ermine Quarterly, Castile and Leon, impaling, quarterly, France and England, a label of three points ermine	Son of: King Edward III and Queen Philippa. See: House of Lancaster
	Blanche of Lancaster	1345–1369	England a label of France (Old Lancaster)	Daughter of: Henry of Grosmont, Duke of Lancaster and Isabel of Beaumont. Married to: John of Gaunt, Duke of Lancaster; 1359–1369.
	Constance of Castile	1354–1394	Quarterly, Castile and Leon (Kingdom of Castile)	Daughter of: King Peter of Castile and María de Padilla. Married to: John of Gaunt, Duke of Lancaster; 1371–1394.
	Katherine Swynford	1350–1403	Gules, three Catherine wheels Or (Roet)	Daughter of: Payne de Roet. Married to: John of Gaunt, Duke of Lancaster; 1396–1399.

Colour key
(Line of descent)
Monarchs
Paternal descent
Maternal descent
Consorts
Illegitimate descent
Collaterals

=== Descendants of John of Gaunt, 1st Duke of Lancaster ===
Arms	Name	Life	Blazon	Notes
	Henry Bolingbroke, Duke of Hereford and Lancaster (later King Henry IV)	1366–1413	As Duke of Hereford: Quarterly, 1st and 4th, France ancien, 2nd and 3rd England, with a label of five points ermine (Richmond) As Duke of Lancaster and Hereford: Quarterly, 1st and 4th, France ancien, 2nd and 3rd England, with a label of five points two of ermine (Richmond) and three Azure flory Or (Lancaster)	Son of: John of Gaunt, Duke of Lancaster and Blanche of Lancaster.
	John Beaufort, Earl of Somerset	1373–1410	Per pale, Argent and Azure, over all on a bend Gules three lions passant guardant Or with a label of three points Azure each charges with three fleur de lys Or Quarterly, 1st and 4th, France ancien, 2nd and 3rd England, within a bordure componée Argent and Azure	Illegitimate Son (legitimated in 1396) of: John of Gaunt, Duke of Lancaster and Katherine Swynford. See: House of Beaufort
	Henry Beaufort, Cardinal of St. Eusebius and Bishop of Winchester	1374–1447	Quarterly, 1st and 4th, France ancien, 2nd and 3rd England, within a bordure componée Argent and Azure	Illegitimate Son (legitimated in 1396) of: John of Gaunt, Duke of Lancaster and Katherine Swynford.
	Thomas Beaufort, Duke of Exeter	1377–1426	Quarterly, 1st and 4th, France ancien, 2nd and 3rd England, within a bordure componée Azure and Ermine	Illegitimate Son (legitimated in 1396) of: John of Gaunt, Duke of Lancaster and Katherine Swynford.

==== Descendants of Henry IV of England ====
Arms	Name	Life	Blazon	Notes
	King Henry IV	1366–1413	Quarterly, 1st and 4th, France ancien, 2nd and 3rd England Changed to France moderne in line with changes made in that kingdom: Quarterly, 1st and 4th, France moderne, 2nd and 3rd England	Son of: John of Gaunt, Duke of Lancaster and Blanche of Lancaster. In 1376, the kings of France altered the royal coat of arms, replacing the field semée fleurs de lys with three fleurs de lys, alluding to the Trinity. This new design is referred to as France Moderne, the previous one being France Ancien. From about 1400 the kings of England imitated this change. As modified, the monarchs of England continued to bear arms in this form until the crown union with Scotland in 1603. First king of the House of Lancaster.
	Mary de Bohun	1370–1394	Azure, a bend Argent between two cotise and six lions rampant Or (de Bohun)	Daughter of: Humphrey de Bohun, Earl of Hereford and Joan FitzAlan. Married to: Henry Bolingbroke (later King Henry IV); 1380–1394.
	Joan of Navarre	1370–1437	Quarterly, 1st and 4th, France ancien and a baston gobony Argent and Gules (Evreux), 2nd and 3rd, Gules, a cross, a saltire and an orle of chain linked together Or (Navarre)	Daughter of: King Charles II of Navarre and Joan of Valois. Married to: King Henry IV; 1399–1413.

Arms	Name	Life	Blazon	Notes
	Henry of Monmouth, Prince of Wales (later King Henry V)	1386–1422	Quarterly, 1st and 4th, France moderne, 2nd and 3rd England, with a label of three points Argent	Son of: King Henry IV and Mary de Bohun.
	Thomas of Lancaster, Duke of Clarence	1387–1421	Quarterly, 1st and 4th, France moderne, 2nd and 3rd England, with a label of three points ermine, each with a canton Gules	Son of: King Henry IV and Mary de Bohun.
	John of Lancaster, Duke of Bedford	1389–1435	Quarterly, 1st and 4th, France moderne, 2nd and 3rd England, with a label of five points, the two on the dexter side ermine and each of the other three charged with three fleurs de lys	Son of: King Henry IV and Mary de Bohun.
	Humphrey of Lancaster, Duke of Gloucester	1390–1447	Quarterly, 1st and 4th, France moderne, 2nd and 3rd England, within a bordure Argent	Son of: King Henry IV and Mary de Bohun.

===== Descendants of Henry V of England =====
Arms	Name	Life	Blazon	Notes
	King Henry V	1386–1422	Quarterly, 1st and 4th, France moderne, 2nd and 3rd England	Son of: King Henry IV and Mary de Bohun.
	Catherine of Valois	1401–1437	Azure, three fleur de lys Or (France moderne)	Daughter of: King Charles VI of France and Isabeau of Bavaria. Married to: King Henry V; 1420–1422. Later married to: Owen Tudor; 1428?–1437, progenitor of the House of Tudor.

Arms	Name	Life	Blazon	Notes
	King Henry VI	1421–1471	France moderne, impaling, quarterly, 1st and 4th, France moderne, 2nd and 3rd England	Son of: King Henry V and Catherine of Valois. Throne usurped by Edward, Earl of March, who became King Edward IV in 1461.
	Margaret of Anjou	1430–1482	Quarterly of six, 1st, barry of eight Argent and Gules (Hungary), 2nd, Azure, semée of fleur de lys Or, a label of three points Gules (Naples), 3rd, Argent, a cross potent between four crosses Or (Jerusalem), 4th, Azure, semée of fleur de lys Or, a bordure Gules (Anjou), 5th Azure, semée of crosses crosslet fitchée, two barbels addorsée Or (Bar), 6th, Or, on a bend Gules three allerions Argent (Lorraine)	Daughter of: King René of Naples, Duke of Anjou and Isabella of Lorraine. Married to: King Henry VI; 1445–1471.

Arms

Name
Edward of Westminster, Prince of Wales
Life
1453–1471
Blazon
Quarterly, 1st and 4th, France moderne, 2nd and 3rd England, with a label of three points Argent
Notes
Son of: King Henry VI and Margaret of Anjou.

Killed at the Battle of Tewkesbury 1471.

Colour key
(Line of descent)
Monarchs
Paternal descent
Maternal descent
Consorts
Illegitimate descent
Collaterals

=== Descendants of John Beaufort, 1st Earl of Somerset ===
Arms	Name	Life	Blazon	Notes
	John Beaufort, Earl of Somerset	1373–1410	Per pale, Argent and Azure, over all on a bend Gules three lions passant guardant Or with a label of three points Azure each charges with three fleur de lys Or Quarterly, 1st and 4th, France ancien, 2nd and 3rd England, within a bordure componée Argent and Azure	Illegitimate Son (legitimated in 1396) of: John of Gaunt, Duke of Lancaster and Katherine Swynford.
	Margaret Holland, Countess of Somerset	1385–1439	Quarterly, 1st and 4th, France ancien, 2nd and 3rd England, within a bordure componée Argent and Azure, impaling, Gules, three lions passant guardant Or, within a bordure Argent	Daughter of: Thomas Holland, Earl of Kent and Alice Holland, Countess of Kent Married to: John Beaufort, Earl of Somerset; 1399–1410 Married to: Thomas of Lancaster, Duke of Clarence; 1411–1421

Arms	Name	Life	Blazon	Notes
	John Beaufort, Duke of Somerset	1403–1444	Quarterly, 1st and 4th, France moderne, 2nd and 3rd England, within a bordure componée Argent and Azure	Son of: John Beaufort, Earl of Somerset and Margaret Holland.
	Margaret Beauchamp	1406–1482	Quarterly, 1st and 4th, France moderne, 2nd and 3rd England, within a bordure componée Argent and Azure, impaling, Gules, on a fess Or a mullet Sable, between six martlets, three, two and one, of the second (Beauchamp)	Daughter of: John Beauchamp of Bletso and Edith Stourton. Married to: Sir Oliver St John, of Bletsoe; 1425–1437. Married to: John Beaufort, Duke of Somerset; 1439–1444. Married to: Lionel de Welles, Baron Welles; 1447–1461.

Arms	Name	Life	Blazon	Notes
	Lady Margaret Beaufort	1443–1509	Quarterly, 1st and 4th, France moderne, 2nd and 3rd England, within a bordure componée Argent and Azure Quarterly, France moderne and England, a bordure Azure charged alternatively with fleurs de lys and martlets Or, impaling, Quarterly, 1st and 4th, France moderne, 2nd and 3rd England, within a bordure componée Argent and Azure	Daughter of: John Beaufort, Duke of Somerset and Margaret Beauchamp. Married to: Edmund Tudor, 1st Earl of Richmond; 1455–1456. Married to: Sir Henry Stafford; 1462–1471. Married to: Thomas Stanley, Earl of Derby; 1472–1504.
	Edmund Tudor, Earl of Richmond	1430–1456	Quarterly, France moderne and England, a bordure Azure charged alternatively with fleurs de lys and martlets Or	Son of: Sir Owen Tudor and Catherine of Valois. Half brother to King Henry VI, legitimated by Parliament in 1453.

Arms	Name	Life	Blazon	Notes
	Henry Tudor, Earl of Richmond (later King Henry VII)	1457–1509	Quarterly, France moderne and England, a bordure Azure charged alternatively with fleurs de lys and martlets Or Quarterly, 1st and 4th, France moderne, 2nd and 3rd England	Son of: Edmund Tudor, Earl of Richmond and Lady Margaret Beaufort. Defeats King Richard III at the Battle of Bosworth Field in 1485, claims the throne as King Henry VII. See: House of Tudor
	Elizabeth of York	1466–1503	Quarterly, 1st, quarterly, 1st and 4th, France moderne, 2nd and 3rd England, 2nd and 3rd de Burgh, 4th Mortimer	Daughter of: King Edward IV and Elizabeth Woodville. Married to: King Henry VII; 1486–1503. Heiress of the House of York.

=== Lancaster badges ===
The Red Rose of Lancaster derives from the gold rose badge of Edward I of England. Other members of his family used variants of the royal badge, with the king's brother, the Earl of Lancaster, using a red rose. It is believed that the Red Rose of Lancaster was the House of Lancaster's badge during the Wars of the Roses. Evidence for this "wearing of the rose" includes land tenure records requiring service of a red rose yearly for a manor held directly from Henry VI of England. There are, however, doubts as to whether the red rose was actually an emblem taken up by the Lancastrians during the Wars of the Roses. Adrian Ailes has noted that the red rose "probably owes its popular usage to Henry VII quickly responding to the pre-existing Yorkist white rose in an age when signs and symbols could speak louder than words."

It also allowed Henry to invent and exploit his most famous heraldic device, the Tudor Rose, combining the so-called Lancastrian red rose and the White Rose of York. This floral union neatly symbolised the restoration of peace and harmony and his marriage in January 1486 to Elizabeth of York; it has been described as "a brilliant piece of simple heraldic propaganda." The Tudor Rose is used as the plant badge of England (Scotland uses the thistle, Ireland uses the shamrock, and Wales uses the leek).

Red Rose Badge of Lancaster

Monogram SS Badge of Henry IV

Chained Antelope Badge of Henry V and VI

Hereford Swan Badge of Henry V

Fire Beacon Badge of Henry V

Crossed Feather Badge of Henry VI

Panther Badge of Henry VI

== See also ==
- Background information on the Act that enable the House of Lancaster to accumulate its vast holdings can be found at Quia Emptores
- Further information on the Lancastrian descent in Portugal and Spain – Philippa of Lancaster, Jorge de Lencastre, Duke of Coimbra, John of Lencastre, 1st Duke of Aveiro
- Forced marriage
- Women's history
- White Rose of York
- Alternative successions to the English Crown

== Bibliography ==
- Allmand, C. T. (2010). "Henry V (1386–1422)". Oxford Dictionary of National Biography (online ed.). Oxford University Press. doi:10.1093/ref:odnb/12952. (Subscription, Wikipedia Library access or UK public library membership required.)
- Belsey, Catherine (1992). "Making History". In Holderness, Graham (ed.). Shakespeare's history plays: Richard II to Henry V. Macmillan. ISBN 0333549023.
- Brewer, DS (2012). John Gower, Poetry and Propaganda in Fourteenth-century England (Volume 7 of Publications of the John Gower Society ed.). DS Brewer. ISBN 978-1843843153.
- Brooke-Little, J.P., FSA (1978) [1950], Boutell's Heraldry (Revised ed.), London: Frederick Warne, ISBN 0-7232-2096-4
- Brown, Henry; Summerson, A. L (2010). "Henry IV (1367–1413)". Oxford Dictionary of National Biography (online ed.). Oxford University Press. doi:10.1093/ref:odnb/12951. (Subscription, Wikipedia Library access or UK public library membership required.)
- Castor, Helen (2000). The King, the Crown, and the Duchy of Lancaster: Public Authority and Private Power, 1399–1461. Oxford University Press. ISBN 0-19-820622-4.
- Crofton, Ian (2007). The Kings and Queens of England. Quercus. ISBN 978-1-84724-065-1.
- Davies, Norman (1997). Europe – A History. Pimlico. ISBN 0-7126-6633-8.
- Davies, Norman (1999). The Isles – A History. MacMillan. ISBN 0-333-76370-X.
- Davies, R R (1995). The Revolt of Owain Glyn Dwr. Oxford University Press. ISBN 0-19-280209-7.
- Fowler, Kenneth Alan (1969). The King's Lieutenant: Henry of Grosmont, First Duke of Lancaster, 1310–1361. Elek (Paul) (Scientific Books) Ltd. ISBN 0-236-30812-2.
- Galbraith, Vivian Hunter (1982). Kings and chroniclers: essays in English medieval history. Hambledon Press. ISBN 095068824X.
- Goodman, Anthony (1981). The Wars of the Roses: Military Activity and English Society, 1452–97. Taylor & Francis. ISBN 0-415-05264-5.
- Griffiths, G. L. (2004). "Henry VI (1421–1471)". Oxford Dictionary of National Biography (online ed.). Oxford University Press. doi:10.1093/ref:odnb/12953. (Subscription, Wikipedia Library access or UK public library membership required.)
- Griffiths, G. L. (2008). "Mortimer, Edmund (V), fifth earl of March and seventh earl of Ulster (1391–1425)". Oxford Dictionary of National Biography (online ed.). Oxford University Press. doi:10.1093/ref:odnb/19344. (Subscription, Wikipedia Library access or UK public library membership required.)
- Harriss, R. A. (2004a). "Thomas, duke of Clarence (1387–1421)". Oxford Dictionary of National Biography (online ed.). Oxford University Press. doi:10.1093/ref:odnb/27198. (Subscription, Wikipedia Library access or UK public library membership required.)
- Harriss, R. A. (2004b). "Humphrey, duke of Gloucester (1390–1447)". Oxford Dictionary of National Biography (online ed.). Oxford University Press. doi:10.1093/ref:odnb/14155. (Subscription, Wikipedia Library access or UK public library membership required.)
- Hicks, Michael (2010). The Wars of the Roses. Yale University Press. ISBN 9780300114232.
- Johnston, Malcolm S. F. (30 March 2027). 1399: the Lancastrian Conquest: Henry IV and Thomas Arundel's Campaign to Build a New England. Fonthill Media LLc. ISBN 978-1-0361-8869-6.
- Jones, Dan (2012). The Plantagenets: The Kings Who Made England. HarperPress. ISBN 978-0-00-745749-6.
- Lee, Christopher (1997). This Sceptred Isle. Penguin Books. ISBN 978-1-84529-994-1.
- Lloyd, Simon (2004). "Edmund, first earl of Lancaster and first earl of Leicester (1245–1296)". Oxford Dictionary of National Biography (online ed.). Oxford University Press. doi:10.1093/ref:odnb/8504. (Subscription, Wikipedia Library access or UK public library membership required.)
- Loschiavo, L. A. (1978). "The birth of 'Blanche the Duchesse': 1340 versus 1347'". Chaucer Review. 13: 128–32.
- Marshall, John (2026). Edmund, 1st Earl of Lancaster. Barsnley: Pen and Sword Books. ISBN 978-1-03614-368-8.
- Mate, Mavis (2006). Trade and Economic Developments 1450–1550: The Experience of Kent, Surrey and Sussex. Boydell Press. ISBN 1-84383-189-9.
- McFarlane, K.B. (1972). Lancastrian kings and Lollard knights. Oxford University Press. ISBN 0198223447.
- McKisack, M. (1959). The Fourteenth Century: 1307–1399. Continuum Publishing Corporation. ISBN 978-1441102690.
- Mortimer, Ian (2012). Medieval Intrigue: Decoding Royal Conspiracies. Continuum. ISBN 978-1441102690.
- Palmer, J. J. N. (1974). "The historical context of the Book of the Duchess: a revision". Chaucer Review. 8: 253–61.
- Pinches, John Harvey; Pinches, Rosemary (1974). The Royal Heraldry of England. Heraldry Today. Slough, Buckinghamshire: Hollen Street Press. ISBN 0-900455-25-X.
- Saul, Nigel (1997). Richard II. New Haven: Yale University Press. ISBN 0-300-07003-9.
- Schama, Simon (2000). A History of Britain – At the edge of the world. BBC. ISBN 0-563-53483-4.
- Sherborne, James (1994). War, Politics and Culture in 14th Century England. Bloomsbury Publishing. ISBN 1852850868.
- Storey, Robin (1986). The End of the House of Lancaster. Sutton Publishing. ISBN 0-86299-290-7.
- Stratford, Jenny (2004). "John, duke of Bedford (1389–1435)". Oxford Dictionary of National Biography (online ed.). Oxford University Press. doi:10.1093/ref:odnb/14844. (Subscription, Wikipedia Library access or UK public library membership required.)
- Swanson, R.N. (1995). Religion and Devotion in Europe, c. 1215–c. 1515. Cambridge University Press. ISBN 0-521-37950-4.
- Tuck, Anthony (2004). Crown and Nobility 1272–1461: Political Conflict in Late Medieval England. London: Fontana. ISBN 0-00-686084-2.
- Walker, Simon (2004a). "John, duke of Aquitaine and duke of Lancaster, styled king of Castile and León (1340–1399)". Oxford Dictionary of National Biography (online ed.). Oxford University Press. doi:10.1093/ref:odnb/14843. (Subscription, Wikipedia Library access or UK public library membership required.)
- Walker, Simon (2004b). "Blanche of Lancaster (1346?–1368)". Oxford Dictionary of National Biography (online ed.). Oxford University Press. doi:10.1093/ref:odnb/54463. (Subscription, Wikipedia Library access or UK public library membership required.)
- Waugh, Scott L. (2004). "Henry of Lancaster, third Earl of Lancaster and third Earl of Leicester (c.1280–1345)". Oxford Dictionary of National Biography (online ed.). Oxford University Press. doi:10.1093/ref:odnb/12959. (Subscription, Wikipedia Library access or UK public library membership required.)
- Weir, Alison (1995). Lancaster & York – The Wars of the Roses. Pimlico. ISBN 0-7126-6674-5.
- Weir, Alison (2008). Britain's Royal Families. Vintage. ISBN 978-0-09-953973-5.

Royal house House of Lancaster
Preceded by House of Valois	Ruling house of the Kingdom of France (disputed with the House of Valois); 1422–1453	Succeeded by House of Valois
Preceded by House of Plantagenet (senior line)	Ruling house of the Duchy of Aquitaine; 1399–1422	Succeeded by House of Valois
Preceded by House of Plantagenet (senior line)	Ruling house of the Kingdom of England; 1399–1461	Succeeded by House of York
Preceded by House of York	Ruling house of the Kingdom of England; 1470–1471	Succeeded by House of York
