= Bolingbroke, Lincolnshire =

Village in Lincolnshire, England

Coordinates: 53.1666°N 0.0160°E

Old Bolingbroke
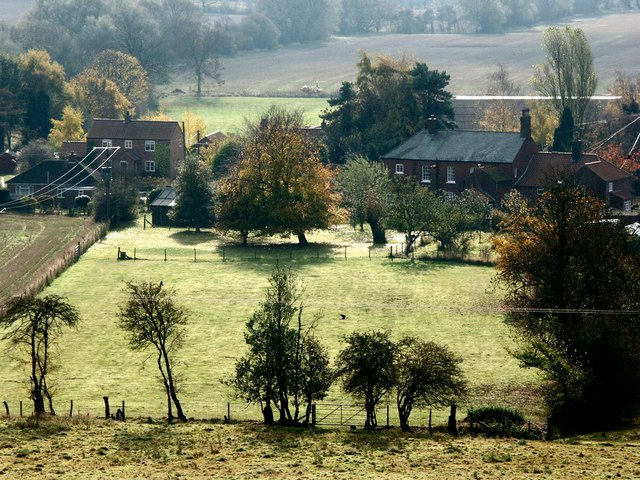
- Old Bolingbroke

- Location within Lincolnshire
- Population: 325 (2011)
- OS grid reference: TF348651
  - London: 115 mi (185 km) S
- Civil parish: Bolingbroke
- District: East Lindsey
- Shire county: Lincolnshire
- Region: East Midlands
- Country: England
- Sovereign state: United Kingdom
- Post town: Spilsby
- Postcode district: PE23
- Dialling code: 01790
- Police: Lincolnshire
- Fire: Lincolnshire
- Ambulance: East Midlands
- UK Parliament: Louth and Horncastle
- Website: Bolingbroke Parish Council

Bolingbroke, now called Old Bolingbroke, is a village and civil parish in the East Lindsey district of Lincolnshire, England. Its present boundaries were formed by the amalgamation of the Parishes of Bolingbroke and Hareby in 1739. The population at the 2011 census was 325.

Bolingbroke is 3 miles (4.8 km) west of Spilsby. The village of New Bolingbroke is 6 miles (9.7 km) to the south-west. The prime meridian passes through the parish to the west of Old Bolingbroke.

== History ==
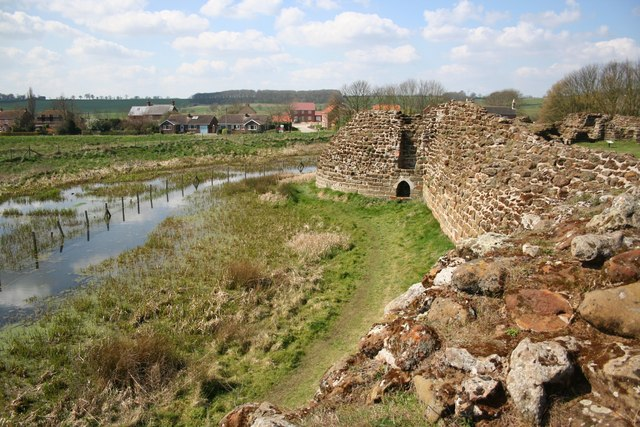
Bolingbroke Castle

Bolingbroke appears in the Domesday Book of 1086 as "Bolingborc", one of 38 places associated with Stori of Bolingbroke at the time of the Norman conquest. This suggests an Anglo-Saxon etymological origin, possibly "Bolingburh" or similar (burh of Bolla's people).

William de Roumare, Earl of Lincoln (born c. 1096), may have built Bolingbroke Castle in the 12th century as a motte and bailey castle with wet ditch to replace an earlier earthwork defence structure which overlooked the village on Dewy Hill. In the early 13th century, a new castle was constructed at the present site by Ranulph de Blondeville, 4th Earl of Chester following his return in 1220 from the Fifth Crusade. Later, John of Gaunt, son of Edward III, acquired the castle through his wife, Blanche of Lancaster. In 1367, it was the birthplace of John's son, Henry, known as Henry Bolingbroke, who became King Henry IV of England. The parish church of Old Bolingbroke was rebuilt by Alice de Lacy and John of Gaunt. It was significantly damaged during the siege of the castle in 1643 during the Civil War when the Royalists used the castle to garrison troops prior to the Battle of Winceby (11 October 1643). Only the South Aisle of the 14th century Church remains. A new North Aisle was added during significant renovations by John Fowler in 1889. The last remaining castle structure fell down in 1815. The site became a grassy hillock, which archeologists excavated in the 1970s.

== Geography ==
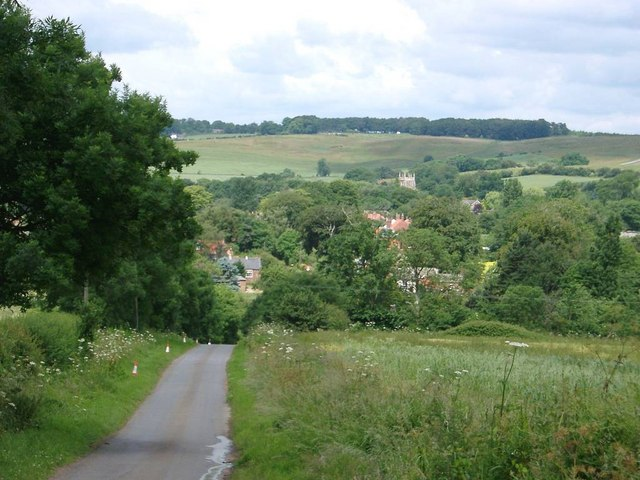
Old Bolingbroke from Keal Hill

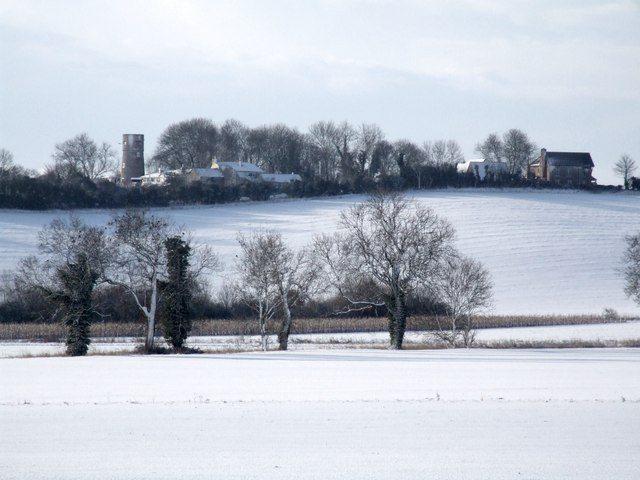
Tower of former windmill on Kirby Hill

The village sits in a broad valley of the Lincolnshire Wolds, between two streams, that rise in the surrounding hills. These eventually become what is known to the south as Hagnaby Beck. The village is at about 25 m (82 ft) above sea level.

To the North West the land rises to the 105 m (344.5 ft) on Horncastle Hill, where the parish boundary falls at the highest point in the parish, if not quite the summit of the hill. To the north-east the road called Spilsby Hill climbs to a separate high point at Highfield Farm. Between these two the narrow Sow Dale leads down to the village, where Knoll Hill stands. Sow Dale is the largest of the narrow valleys that cut through the Spilsby Sandstone ridge that forms the high plateau above the village. The traditional grazed landscape is now represented by two nature reserves only. Only the Lower one is in the parish, the upper one is adjacent to the boundary.

Another hill to the south east more high ground forms Keal Hill and Hall Hill where the parish boundary is drawn. So there is another small dale leading down into the village from the east. To the southwest another hill known as Kirkby Hill is topped with a former windmill that sits just within the parish boundary.

The high portions of the parish are composed of the Spilsby Sandstone, which overlays here the deeper Kimmeridge and Ampthill mudstones. Eroded by the streams in the Dales, the Sandstones are removed, exposing in part the mudstone layer, although in general these are covered in the village and the river valley to the south-west by the Quaternary post-glacial sands and gravels of the Bain Valley formation.

The parish boundary is complex, but can be summarised as surrounding the village, which is broadly central, and enclosing the rising ground in all directions. It generally does not include the plateau above the village. No major roads cross the parish, but the village is joined by minor roads to many surrounding settlements. The Prime (Greenwich) Meridian runs through the Parish just west of the village. There are, and were, no railway connections, the nearest stations being historically Spilsby, and now Thorpe Culvert.

== Community ==
Events at the castle site are overseen by Heritage Lincolnshire, and locally by the Friends of Bolingbroke Castle, who also arrange other local charitable functions.

The Parish Council own and maintain the King George V Playing Field and Ramsden Village Hall, the latter named for John and Eleanor Ramsden who bequeathed the land used for both to the village in 1937.

The mobile library visits for an hour a month.

The ecclesiastical parish of Old Bolingbroke is part of the Spilsby, Marden Hill, Stickney and Partney Group Parishes of the Deanery of Bolingbroke. The parish church is dedicated to Saint Peter and Saint Paul. There is a second church in the parish in Hareby, also named Saint Peter and Saint Paul.

The village's Methodist Chapel in Chapel Lane was built in 1845. It is part of the Mid Lincolnshire Circuit. The congregation became an eco-congregation in 2007.

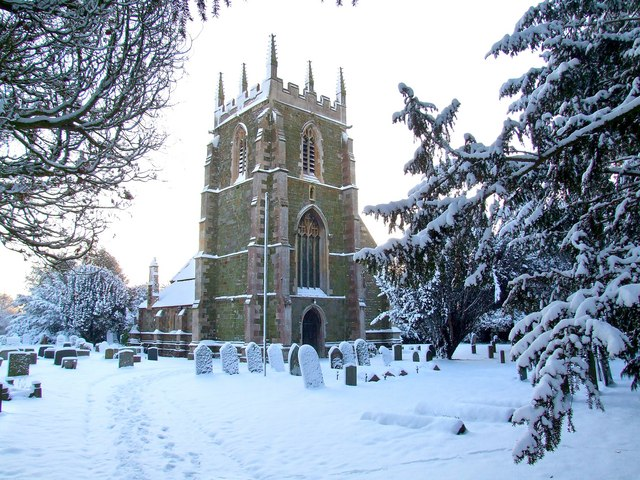
Church of Saints Peter & Paul

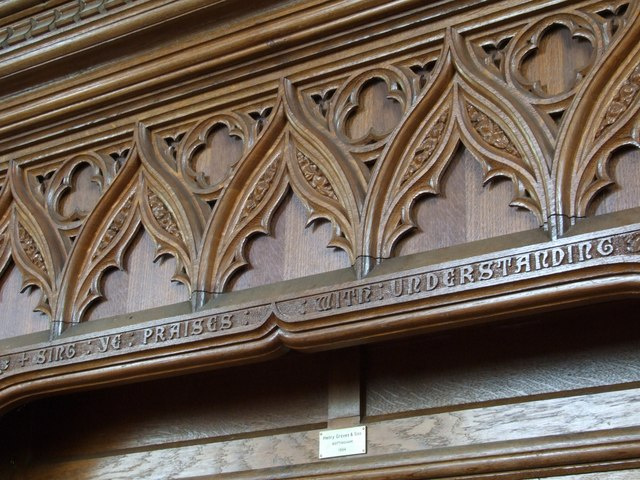
Interior detail of the Church of Saints Peter & Paul

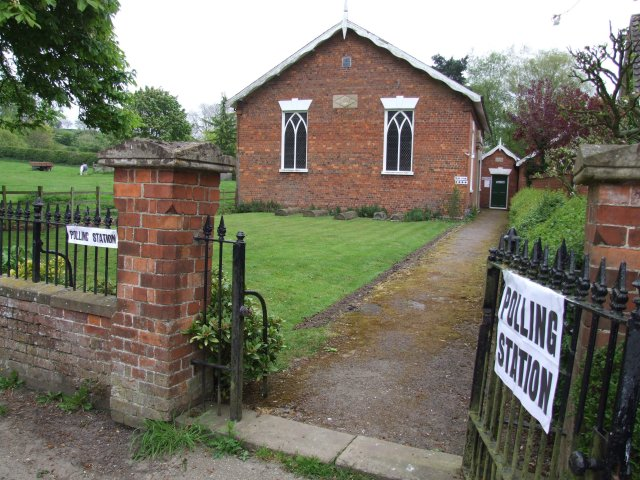
Methodist chapel, built in 1845

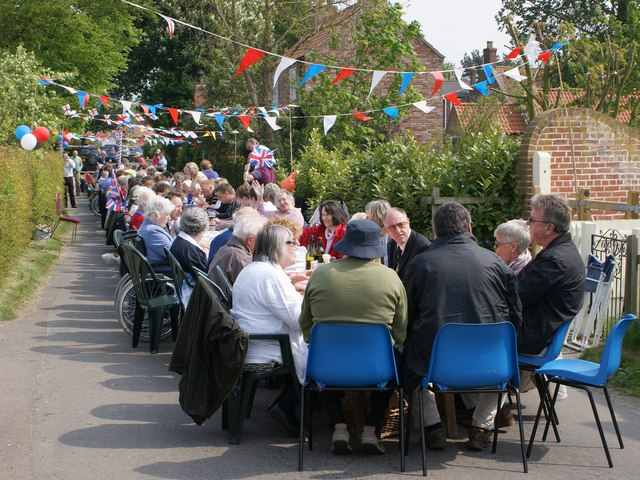
Street party in West Keal Road, 29 April 2011, organised to celebrate the marriage of Prince William and Catherine Middleton
