= Maud, Countess of Leicester =

English noblewoman

Maud of Lancaster (4 April 1340 – 10 April 1362), also known as Matilda, Countess of Leicester, was a 14th-century English noblewoman who married into the Bavarian ducal family.

The eldest daughter of Henry of Grosmont, 1st Duke of Lancaster and Earl of Leicester, and his wife Isabel de Beaumont, she was born at Bolingbroke Castle in Lindsey.

== Marriages ==
She was married firstly to Ralph Stafford, son of Ralph Stafford, 1st Earl of Stafford, whilst still a child. Following his death, she married secondly, in 1352, to William I, Duke of Bavaria, a member of the Wittelsbach Bavarian royal family.

== Inheritance ==
The Duchy of Lancaster (First Creation) became extinct upon her father's death in 1361, however Maud became co-heiress, with her sister Blanche of Lancaster, to her father's estates and remaining titles. The title Earl of Leicester passed to her second husband who was confined due to insanity from 1358 until death in 1389, whilst the Earldom of Lancaster passed to her younger sister's husband, John of Gaunt. Maud died a year later without surviving issue (her only child, a daughter by William V, having died in 1356), so the remainder of her father's inheritance passed to Blanche and John of Gaunt upon her death. That inheritance provided the political and financial foundation of the House of Lancaster, with the Lancastrian King Henry IV of England being Maud's nephew.

== Ancestry ==
Ancestors of Maud, Countess of Leicester

8. Edmund Crouchback, 1st Earl of Lancaster
4. Henry, 3rd Earl of Lancaster
9. Blanche of Artois
2. Henry of Grosmont, 1st Duke of Lancaster
10. Patrick de Chaworth, Lord of Kidwelly
5. Maud Chaworth
11. Isabella de Beauchamp
1. Maud, Countess of Leicester
12. Louis de Brienne
6. Henry de Beaumont
13. Agnés de Beaumont
3. Isabel of Beaumont
14. Alexander Comyn, Sheriff of Aberdeen
7. Alice Comyn
15. Joan le Latimer

Preceded by Ingeborg of Mecklenburg-Schwerin	Duchess of Bavaria; 1352–1362	Succeeded by Margaret of Brieg
