= Jeanne de Cavally =

Ivorian children's book writer (1926–1992)

Jeanne Goba (1926 – 7 October 1992), known by her pen name Jeanne de Cavally, was an Ivorian children's book writer.

== Biography ==
Goba (née Wawa) was born to a large family in Bingerville, Ivory Coast, in 1926. She grew up in Tabou and Abidjan. After studying in Rufisque, Senegal, she began a career as a teacher in Ivory Coast, and later became a school principal. She retired from education in 1983.

Goba's first children's book, Papi, was published in 1978. Her pen name, Jeanne de Cavally, was inspired by the Cavally River in Tabou, where she spent her childhood. With the publication of Papi, Goba became the third published woman writer in Ivory Coast, after novelists Simone Kaya and Fatou Bolli, and the first woman writer of children's literature in francophone Africa. Her stories, published in French by Les Nouvelles Éditions Africaines (NEA), centred on the everyday lives of children in Africa.

Goba died on 7 October 1992, at the age of 66. She is considered a pioneer of children's literature in francophone Africa. A children's literature award named in her honour is presented at the annual International Book Fair of Abidjan.

== Works ==
- Papi (1978) ISBN 2723605353
- Poué-Poué, le petit cabri (1981) ISBN 2723605582
- Le réveillon de Boubacar (1981) ISBN 2723605590
- Bley et sa bande (1985) ISBN 2723607453
- Cocochi, le petit poussin jaune (1987) ISBN 2723614247
