= N'Dri =

N'Dri is both a given name and a surname. Notable people with the name include:

- N'Dri Thérèse Assié-Lumumba, Ivorian researcher
- N'Dri Philippe Koffi (born 2002), Ivorian footballer
- Adjoua N'Dri (born 1965), Ivorian handball player
- Alli N'Dri (born 1984), Ivorian footballer
- Éric Pacôme N'Dri (born 1978), Ivorian athlete
- Franck N'Dri (born 1997), Ivorian rower
- Konan N'Dri (born 2000), Ivorian footballer
- Michaël N'dri (born 1984), French footballer
