= Hareby =

Village in Lincolnshire, England

Coordinates: 53.171725°N 0.001315°E

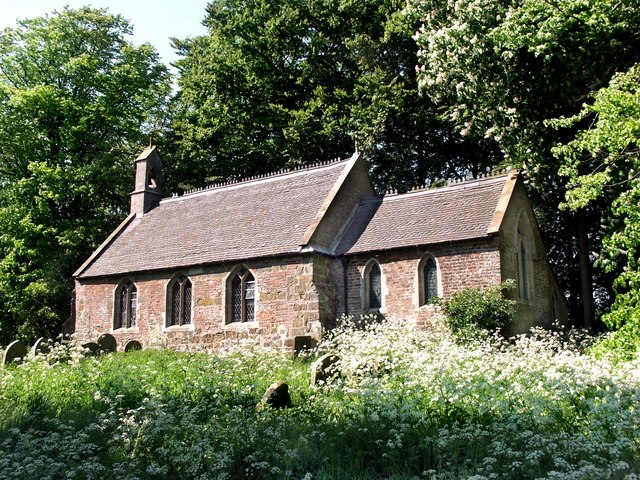
- Church of SS Peter and Paul, Hareby

- Location within Lincolnshire
- OS grid reference: TF336657
  - London: 115 mi (185 km) S
- Civil parish: Bolingbroke
- District: East Lindsey
- Shire county: Lincolnshire
- Region: East Midlands
- Country: England
- Sovereign state: United Kingdom
- Post town: Spilsby
- Postcode district: PE23
- Police: Lincolnshire
- Fire: Lincolnshire
- Ambulance: East Midlands
- UK Parliament: Louth and Horncastle

Hareby is a small village and former civil parish, now in the parish of Bolingbroke, in the East Lindsey district of Lincolnshire, England. It is situated 4 miles (6 km) west from the town of Spilsby. In 1961 the parish had a population of 30. On 1 April 1987 the parish was abolished and merged with Bolingbroke.

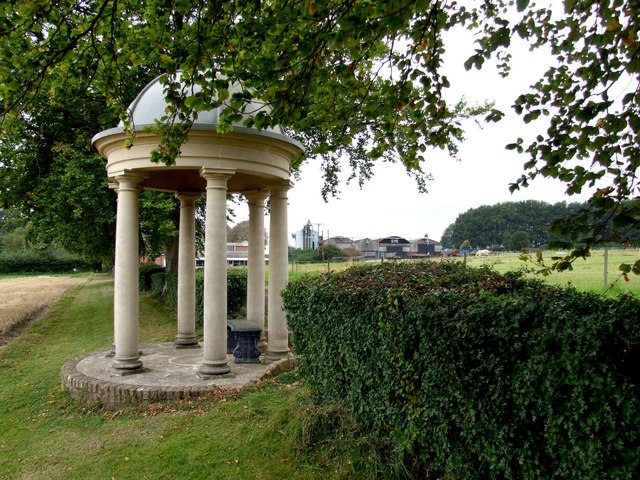
Dome at Hareby

The village is listed in the 1086 Domesday Book. Hareby is now considered a deserted medieval village, and earthworks can be seen south from the church.

The parish church sits on Hareby Hill and is dedicated to Saint Peter and Saint Paul; it is a Grade II listed building of greenstone and red brick. The present church dates from 1858, although it reuses details dating from the 14th century. The font dates from the 17th century.

The church is the setting for a famous scene in Calamy's history of nonconformist ministers. John Horne, who had been ejected from his benefice at Lynn in 1662, preached one day at Hareby. Three sisters in the congregation discussed his merits and the youngest said 'she would think herself happy if she might have such a man, though she begged her bread with him.' This information was soon passed to Rev Horne, who married her. Presumably they had to then beg since he had no benefice income to provide for his new family although he did gain some Church of England jobs from 1673.

The Millennium Dome near the church is a small gazebo with views from Hareby Hill.
