= Alice Comyn, Countess of Buchan =

Scottish noblewoman (1289–1349)

Alice Comyn
- Countess of Buchan; Lady Beaumont
- Born: 1289; Aberdeen, Scotland
- Died: 3 July 1349 (aged 59–60)
- Noble family: Comyn (by birth); Brienne (by marriage)
- Spouse: Henry de Beaumont, 4th Earl of Buchan
- Issue: Katherine, Countess of Atholl; Elizabeth de Beaumont, Lady Audley; Richard de Beaumont; John de Beaumont; Thomas de Beaumont; Alice de Beaumont; Joan de Beaumont, Lady FitzWarin; Beatrice, Countess of Dammartin; John de Beaumont, 2nd Lord Beaumont; Isabel of Beaumont, Duchess of Lancaster
- Father: Alexander Comyn, Sheriff of Aberdeen
- Mother: Joan le Latimer

Alice Comyn, Countess of Buchan, Lady Beaumont (1289 – 3 July 1349) was a Scottish noblewoman, a member of the powerful Comyn family which supported the Balliols, claimants to the disputed Scottish throne against their rivals, the Bruces. She was the niece of John Comyn, Earl of Buchan, to whom she was also heiress, and after his death the Earldom of Buchan was successfully claimed by her husband Henry de Beaumont, Earl of Buchan, by right of his wife. His long struggle to claim her Earldom of Buchan was one of the causes of the Second War of Scottish Independence.

Alice was the maternal grandmother of Blanche of Lancaster, and thus great-grandmother of King Henry IV of England.

She was an attendant at the court of Isabella of France.

== Family ==
Alice was born in Aberdeenshire, Scotland, in 1289, the eldest daughter of Alexander Comyn, Sheriff of Aberdeen and his wife Joan le Latimer and the granddaughter of Alexander Comyn, Earl of Buchan. She had a younger sister, Margaret, who would later marry firstly Sir John Ross, and secondly Sir William Lindsay, Lord of Symertoun.

Alice's paternal grandparents were Alexander Comyn, 2nd Earl of Buchan, Justiciar and Constable of Scotland, and Elizabeth de Quincy; and her maternal grandparents were William le Latimer and Alicia Ledet. Alice's uncle was John Comyn, Earl of Buchan, one of the most powerful nobles in Scotland. The earl, who died in December 1308, was married to Isabella MacDuff, but the marriage was childless. Alice was John Comyn's heiress to the title of Countess of Buchan, although the earldom had been forfeited to the crown prior to her uncle's death in England to where he had gone as a fugitive.

== Marriage and issue ==
Shortly before 14 July 1310, Alice married Henry de Beaumont, Lord Beaumont, the son of Louis de Brienne, Viscount de Beaumont and Agnes, Viscountess de Beaumont. Upon her marriage she was styled as Lady Beaumont. Henry was a key figure in the Anglo-Scottish wars of the 13th and 14th centuries. (See main article: Wars of Scottish Independence) As a consequence of her marriage to Henry, Alice had become, in Scottish eyes, irretrievably English, therefore the Scots recognised her sister Margaret's right to the Earldom of Buchan rather than her own.

The marriage produced many children:

- Katherine de Beaumont (died 11 November 1368), married David III Strathbogie, Earl of Atholl, by whom she had issue.
- Elizabeth de Beaumont (died 27 October 1400), married Nicholas Audley, 3rd Baron Audley. Died without issue.
- Richard de Beaumont
- John de Beaumont (died young)
- Thomas de Beaumont
- Alice de Beaumont
- Joan de Beaumont, married Sir Fulk FitzWarin, 3rd Lord FitzWarin
- Beatrice de Beaumont, married Charles I, Count of Dammartin
- John de Beaumont, 2nd Lord Beaumont (1318- 14 April 1342), on 6 November 1330 married as her first husband, Eleanor of Lancaster, by whom he had issue. He was killed in a tournament.
- Isabel de Beaumont (c.1320- 1361), married in 1337 Henry of Grosmont, 1st Duke of Lancaster, by whom she had two daughters, Maud, Countess of Leicester and Blanche of Lancaster.
- Agnes de Beaumont, married Thomas de Lucy, 2nd Baron Lucy

== Countess of Buchan ==
In April 1313, Isabella MacDuff, the widow of Alice's uncle John Comyn, was placed into the custody of the Beaumonts, following her release from her harsh imprisonment. She had been confined in a cage for four years in Berwick, England by the orders of King Edward I after she crowned Robert the Bruce king of Scotland at Scone in March 1306. In 1310, she was sent to a convent, and three years later was ordered to one of the Beaumont manors where she died on an unknown date.

In 1314, Henry de Beaumont fought at the Battle of Bannockburn on the side of the English.

Sometime between 1317 and 1321, Alice succeeded to the English estates of her younger sister, Margaret.

On 22 January 1334, Alice's husband Henry was summoned to Parliament of England as the Earl of Buchan. He was recognised as earl from that date until 16 November 1339. On 10 February 1334, he sat in the Scottish Parliament bearing the same title. It was Henry's relentless pursuit of Alice's inherited earldom of Buchan which was one of the factors that lead to the Second War of Scottish Independence between the Comyns and their ancient rivals, the Bruces.

Alice died on 3 July 1349 at the age of sixty. Her husband Henry had died in 1340 in the Low Countries where he had gone with King Edward III of England. With the death of Alice, the earldom of Buchan forever passed out of the Comyn family.

Alice's numerous descendants included, Kings Henry IV of England and Henry V of England, Philippa of Lancaster, Anne Boleyn, and Humphrey Kynaston, the English highwayman.

== In fiction ==
Alice Comyn appears as a character in Barbara Erskine's novel Kingdom of Shadows (1988), which is based upon the life of Isabella MacDuff.
