= Bolli =

Bolli is both a given name and a surname. Notable people with the name include:

- Bolli Þorleiksson, key historical character in the Medieval Icelandic Laxdœla saga
  - Bolli Bollason, his son and character in the same saga
- Fatou Bolli, Ivorian novelist
- Justin Bolli, American professional golfer
- Hans Bolli, Swiss bobsledder

== See also ==
- Bollinger
