= Isabel of Beaumont =

English–French noblewoman (c. 1318–1361)

Isabel de Beaumont
- Born: c. 1318
- Died: 1361; Leicester Castle, England
- Spouse: Henry of Grosmont, 1st Duke of Lancaster
- Issue: Maud, Countess of Leicester; Blanche of Lancaster
- House: Brienne
- Father: Henry de Beaumont
- Mother: Alice Comyn, Countess of Buchan

Isabel de Beaumont, Duchess of Lancaster, of the House of Brienne (c. 1318 – 1361) was an English-French noblewoman. She was the youngest daughter and child of Henry de Beaumont, Earl of Buchan and Alice Comyn, Countess of Buchan.

== Family ==
Isabel was born about 1318. She married Henry of Grosmont, 1st Duke of Lancaster in 1330, but lived apart from her husband for a few years before consummation of the marriage due to her age. As her husband's mother had died before the marriage, she became the senior lady of the Lancaster household.

Isabel accompanied her husband on some of his diplomatic travels to the continent, such as to the Low Countries in 1341 and Gascony in 1345. In 1351, he was awarded the title Duke of Lancaster and Isabel became Duchess of Lancaster, the first woman in England to hold the title.

Isabel and Henry had daughters who would eventually inherit their father's estates:

- Maud, Countess of Leicester (4 April 1339 – 10 April 1362), married firstly to Ralph Stafford, son of Ralph Stafford, 1st Earl of Stafford, whilst still a child, and married secondly to William V, Count of Hainaut. Died without surviving issue.
- Blanche, Countess of Lancaster (25 March 1345 – 12 September 1368), married John of Gaunt, the third surviving son of King Edward III of England and Philippa of Hainault, by whom she had seven children, with three surviving to adulthood. Blanche inherited all her father's estates after the death of her sister.

== Death and legacy ==
Isabel died of the plague in 1361 at Leicester Castle. She was buried in Newark Abbey, Leicester. Her husband also died of the plague in March 1361.

With her husband, Isabel founded the College of the Annunciation of St Mary in Newark, Leicester.

Through Blanche, Isabel was an ancestress of England's Royal House of Lancaster, with Henry IV of England being her grandson. Philippa of Lancaster, Queen of Portugal and Elizabeth of Lancaster, Duchess of Exeter were also her grandchildren.

== Sources ==
- Jambeck, Karen K. (1996). "Patterns of Women's Literary Patronage: England, 1200-ca. 1475". In McCash, June Hall (ed.). The Cultural Patronage of Medieval Women. University of Georgia Press. pp. 228–265. ISBN 9780820317021.
- Warner, Kathryn (2018). Blood Roses: The Houses of Lancaster and York Before the Wars of the Roses. History Press. ISBN 9780750990202.
