= Jeanne Adjoua Peuhmond =

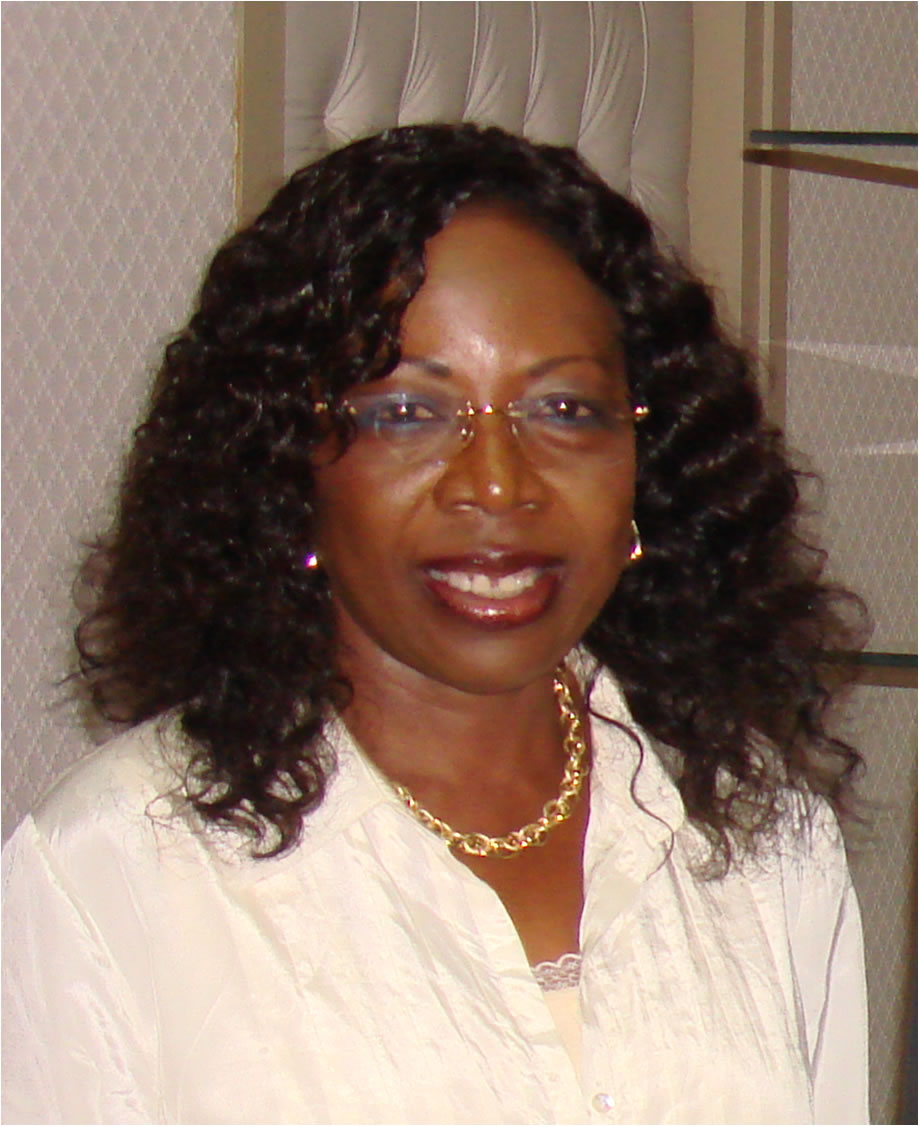
Jeanne Adjoua Peuhmond

Jeanne Adjoua Peuhmond is a politician from Sakassou, Ivory Coast and has been a member of the political party Rally of the Republicans since its formation in 1994.

In May 2024, President Ouattara appointed Peuhmond second vice-governor of Abidjan.

== Political career ==
Peuhmond joined the political party the Rally of the Republicans (RDR) when it was created in 1994 and has risen through the ranks over time. Within the party, Peuhmond has served as the Secretary General of the Rally of Republican Women (RRF). She also served as a member of the central committee and as Special Advisor to the President of the RDR in charge of Equal Opportunities. Most recently, she has served as the General Treasurer of the Party.

From December 2005 to December 2010, Peuhmond served as the Ivory Coast's Minister of Family, Women and Social Affairs. As Minister, she oversaw the creation of the Directorate of Gender Equality and Promotion (DEPG), with the aim of increasing gender equality and combating gender-based violence.

From 2011 to 2016, Peuhmond held the position of Special Advisor to the President of the Republic in charge of Gender and Social Affairs. During this time she oversaw the formation of the Compendium of Women's Competences of Cote d'Ivoire (COCOFCI).

Additionally, Peuhmond has served as a member of the Municipal Council of the Municipality of Abobo and as the fourth deputy mayor of the municipality, which is a suburb of Abidjan. In December 2016, Peuhmond was elected as the Deputy for Abobo, and in April 2017, she was elected as the Vice-President of the National Assembly, a position for which she has been reappointed in both 2021 and 2025.
