= Anne-Marie Adiaffi =

Ivorian writer (1951–1994)

Anne-Marie Adiaffi (1951–1994) was an Ivorian writer who gained fame in 1983 with her novel Une vie hypothéquée (A Mortgaged Life).

Born in 1951 in Abengourou, Adiaffi was educated in Côte d'Ivoire schools before studying in Marseille and ultimately in Dakar, where she received a diploma as a bilingual secretary. After first working in a bank, she joined the publishing house Novelles Éditions Africaines in 1983. After her satiric Une vie hypothéquée, she published La ligne brisée (1989) about a man banished from his village after constant bad luck. She died in Abidjan in 1994.
