= Edith Brou Bleu =

Ivorian writer and activist

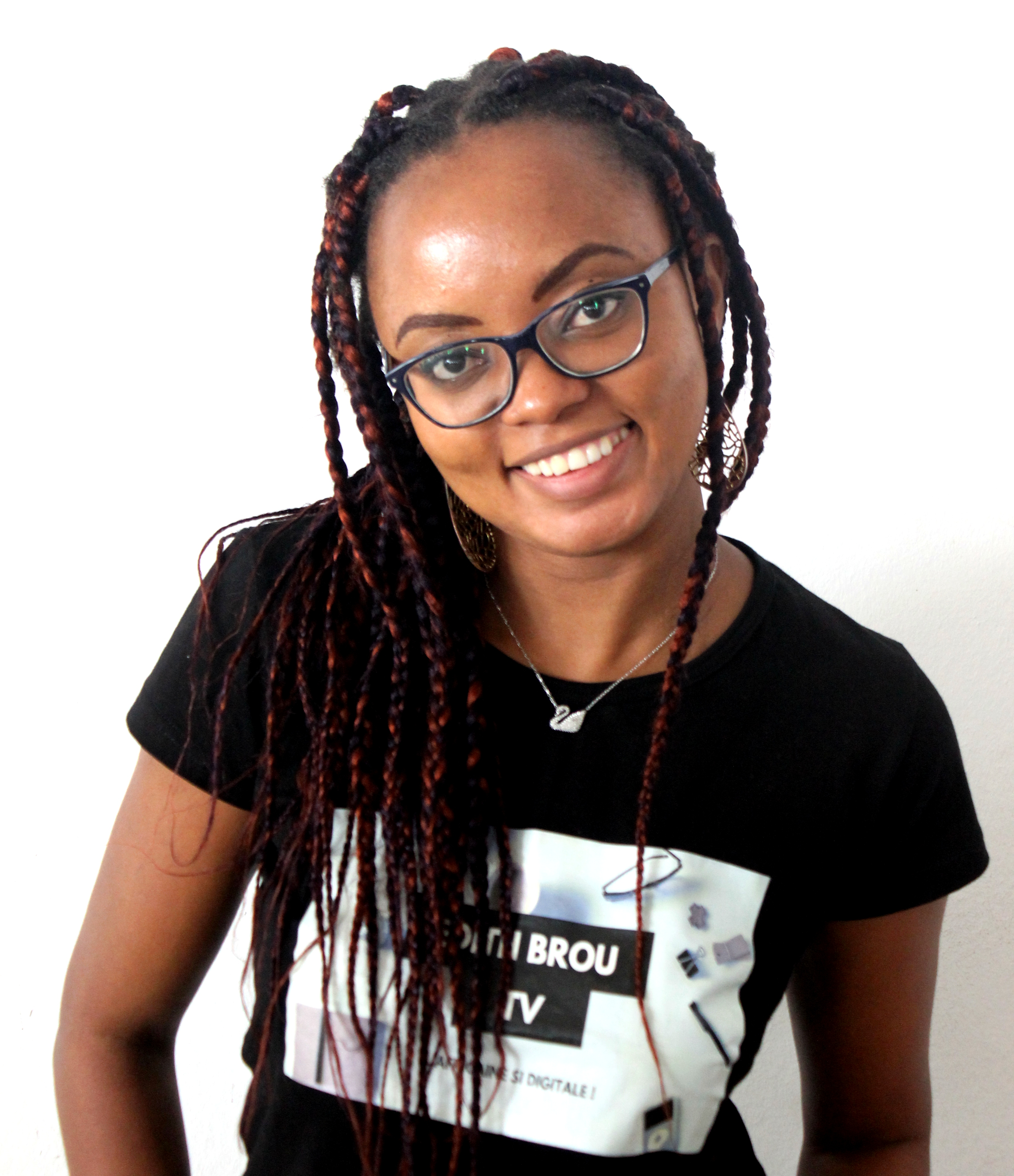
- Born: March 1, 1984 (age 42)
- Occupations: Blogger, digital activist

Edith Brou Bleu (born 1984; née Edith Yah Brou) is an Ivorian writer and activist. A co-founder of the volunteer organization Akendewa and the online women's magazine Ayana, she is considered one of the most influential digital activists in Ivory Coast and a "prominent Ivorian blogger."

== Biography ==
Edith Yah Brou was born in Cocody, a suburb of the Ivorian economic capital Abidjan, on March 1, 1984. She graduated with a degree in economics and management from the Université Félix Houphouët-Boigny in Cocody. She is married to the artist Jacob Bleu.

Brou Bleu is known for her work as a digital writer, activist, and community manager. In 2009, she and nine of her friends co-founded the NGO Akendewa, a volunteer group that organizes high-tech social action campaigns. The following year, during the 2010–2011 Ivorian crisis, Brou Bleu helped coordinate relief efforts using hashtags and other digital tools.

In 2011, she co-founded Ayana, the first digital women's magazine in Ivory Coast.

She originated the "Mousser contre Ebola" ("Lather Against Ebola") campaign in August 2014. Inspired by the "Ice Bucket Challenge," it aimed to raise awareness of the Ebola epidemic. She also organized information-sharing during the June 2014 flooding in her country, helping relay day-to-day updates on risk areas and flooded roads.

In 2015 she was named as president of the Ivory Coast Bloggers Association. That same year, she was named one of the 50 most influential personalities in Ivory Coast by Jeune Afrique.

Brou Bleu also founded a startup production company, Africa Contents Group, through which she develops her own productions, notably the web series "Divan numérique" ("Digital Divan") on YouTube.

In 2020, she was named one of the 100 most influential women in Africa by the firm Avance Media.
