= Marina Niava =

Ivorian film director and producer

- Born: 1985 (age 40–41)
- Education: Institut des Sciences et Techniques de la Communication
- Occupations: Film director, producer, screenwriter
- Years active: 2009-present
- Parent(s): Pierre and Cécile Niava

Marina Niava (born 1985) is an Ivorian film director, film producer, and writer.

== Biography ==
Niava is the youngest daughter of Pierre and Cécile Niava, both language teachers. She developed an early interest in the arts and literature and won several literary prizes. She graduated from Lycée Sainte Marie d'Abidjan and received the Series A Excellence Award. After receiving her diploma in Journalism and Audiovisual Production from the Institut des Sciences et Techniques de la Communication, Niava won a competition run by Radio JAM in Abidjan and began her career as a trainee host. She later worked as a journalist for Africa 24. Niava developed her interest in cinema while filming a commercial.

From 2009 to 2010, Niava served as a co-writer for season 1 of the TV series Teenager, which received the award for best African series at the Vues d'Afrique Festival in Montreal. She moved to Oslo, Norway in 2010 and became communication director of the African Cultural Center. Niava oversaw the 2010 and 2011 Kino Afrika film festivals in Oslo. She was an BENIANH International Foundation's Excellent Scholarship Program laureate in 2012.

In October 2012, she directed her first documentary, Noirs au soleil levant, about the lives of African students in Tsukuba, Japan. Niava's first fictional short film, 21, was completed in December 2013. It was financed by funds from the Organisation internationale de la Francophonie. 21 is about a young woman who cannot stand her mother's younger lover and was the only African film screened at the Oakland International Film Festival. Niava directed the short tragedy Worse in 2014. She worked as the special effects coordinator for the 2015 film Advantageous.

Niava completed her master's degree in Film and Television at Academy of Art University. In 2017, Niava wrote her first novel, American Dreamer. It was a finalist for the 10th Prix Ivoire pour la Littérature Africaine d’Expression Francophone.

== Filmography ==
- 2009-2010: Teenager (TV series, co-writer)
- 2012: Noirs au soleil levant (short film, director)
- 2013: 21 (short film, writer/director)
- 2014: Worse (short film, writer/director)
- 2018: 21 (series, writer/co-director)
- 2020: MTV Shuga Babi, season 1 (writer)
- 2021: Voyages de rêves (director, 5 episodes)
- 2021: MTV Shuga Babi, season 2 (writer)
- 2022: Les coups de la vie, season 2 (director)
- 2023: Les coups de la vie, season 3 (director)
