= The Book of the Duchess =

Poem by Geoffrey Chaucer

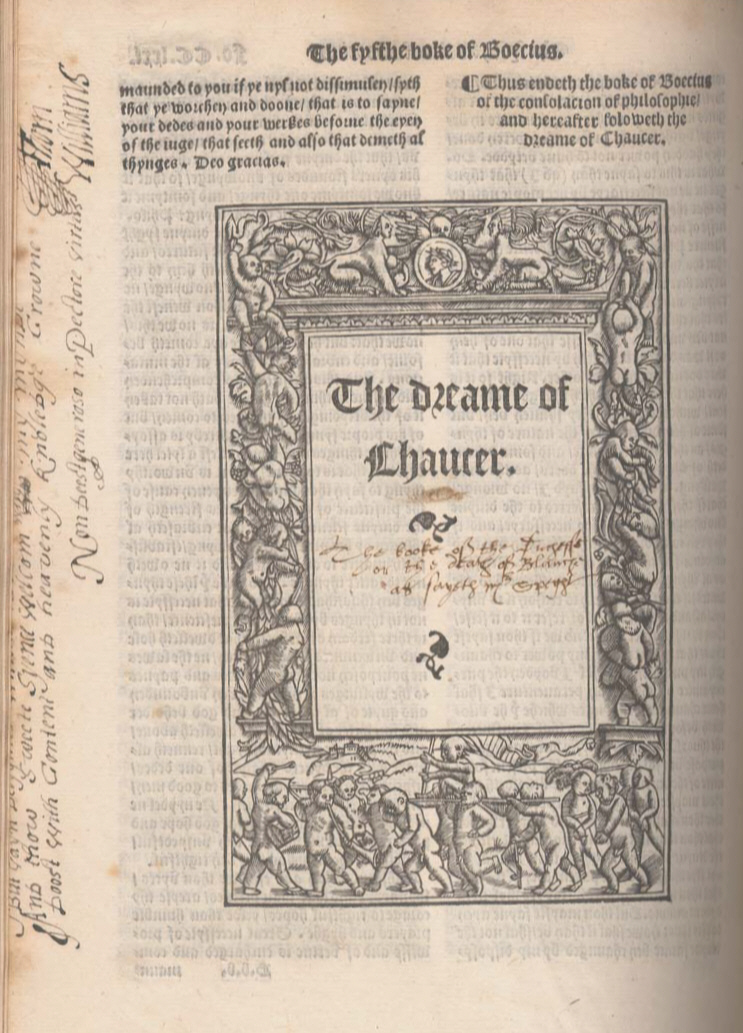
Opening title of The Dreame of Chaucer, commonly referred to as The Book of the Duchess, Geoffrey Chaucer's first own work, which was written probably between 1368 and 1372; published 1532 in the first collected edition of Chaucer's works, edited by William Thynne

The Book of the Duchess, also known as The Deth of Blaunche, is the earliest of Geoffrey Chaucer's major poems, preceded only by his short poem, "An ABC", and possibly by his translation of The Romaunt of the Rose. Based on the themes and title of the poem, most sources put the date of composition after 12 September 1368 (when Blanche of Lancaster died) and before 1372, with many recent studies privileging a date as early as the end of 1368.

Overwhelming (if disputed) evidence suggests that Chaucer wrote the poem to commemorate the death of Blanche of Lancaster, wife of John of Gaunt. The evidence includes handwritten notes from Elizabethan antiquary John Stow indicating that the poem was written at John of Gaunt's request. There are repeated instances of the word "White", which is almost certainly a play on "Blanche". In addition, at the end of the poem there are references to a "long castel", suggesting the house of Lancaster (line 1,318) and a "ryche hil" as John of Gaunt was earl of Richmond (mond=hill) (line 1,319) and the narrator swears by St. John, which is the name of John of Gaunt's saint.

== Plot summary ==
At the beginning of the poem, the sleepless poet, who has suffered from an unexplained sickness for eight years (line 37), lies in his bed, reading a book. A collection of old stories, the book tells the story of Ceyx and Alcyone. The story tells of how Ceyx lost his life at sea, and how Alcyone, his wife, mourned his absence. Unsure of his fate, she prays to the goddess Juno to send her a dream vision. Juno sends a messenger to Morpheus to bring the body of Ceyx with a message to Alcyone.

The messenger finds Morpheus and relays Juno's orders. Morpheus finds the drowned Ceyx and bears him to Alcyone three hours before dawn. The deceased Ceyx instructs Alcyone to bury him and to cease her sorrow, and when Alcyone opens her eyes Ceyx has gone.

The poet stops relaying the story of Ceyx and Alcyone and reflects that he wished that he had a god such as Juno or Morpheus so that he could sleep like Alcyone. He then describes the lavish bed he would gift to Morpheus should the god discover his location. Lost in the book and his thoughts, the poet suddenly falls asleep with the book in his hands. He states that his dream is so full of wonder that no man may interpret it correctly. He begins to relay his dream.

The poet dreams that he wakes in a chamber with windows of stained glass depictions of the tale of Troy and walls painted with the story of The Romance of the Rose. He hears a hunt, leaves the chamber, and inquires who is hunting. The hunt is revealed to be that of Octavian. The dogs are released and the hunt begins, leaving behind the poet and a small dog that the poet follows into the forest. The poet stumbles upon a clearing and finds a knight dressed in black composing a song for the death of his lady. The poet asks the knight the nature of his grief. The knight replies that he had played a game of chess with Fortuna, and lost his queen and was checkmated. The poet takes the message literally and begs the black knight not to become upset over a game of chess.

The knight begins the story of his life, reporting that for his entire life he had served Love, but that he had waited to set his heart on a woman for many years until he met one lady who surpassed all others. The knight speaks of her surpassing beauty and temperament and reveals that her name was "good, fair White". The poet, still not understanding the metaphorical chess game, asks the black knight to finish the story and explain what was lost. The knight tells the story of his fumbling declaration of love and the long time it took for the love to be reciprocated and that they were in perfect harmony for many years. Still the narrator does not understand, and asks the whereabouts of White. The knight finally blurts out that White is dead. The poet realises what has occurred as the hunt ends and the poet awakes with his book still in hand. He reflects on the dream and decides that his dream is so wonderful that it should be set into rhyme.

== Editions and translations ==
=== Editions ===
- Geoffrey Chaucer, Dream Visions and Other Poems: Authoritative Texts, Contexts, Criticism, ed. by Kathryn L. Lynch (New York: Norton, 2007), pp. 3-37.
- 'The Book of the Duchess', ed. by Colin Wilcockson, in The Riverside Chaucer, ed. by Larry D. Benson, third edn (Oxford: Oxford University Press, 2008), pp. 329–46
- Geoffrey Chaucer, The Book of the Duchess, ed. by Helen Phillips, Durham and St. Andrews Medieval Texts, 3 (Durham: Durham and St. Andrews Medieval Texts, 1982), ISBN 0950598925
- 'Book of the duchesse', in The complete works of Geoffrey Chaucer, ed. by Walter William Skeat (London: Oxford University Press, 1937), pp. 83–96.

=== Translations ===
- Book of the Duchess: Geoffrey Chaucer, Fourteenth Century Middle English Verse, trans. by Richard Scott-Robinson (2016)
- Geoffrey Chaucer, The Dream Poems and Other Works, trans. by A. S. Kline (2008)

== See also ==
- Middle English
