= Blanche of Lancaster =

English noblewoman (1342–1368)

Blanche
- Duchess of Lancaster
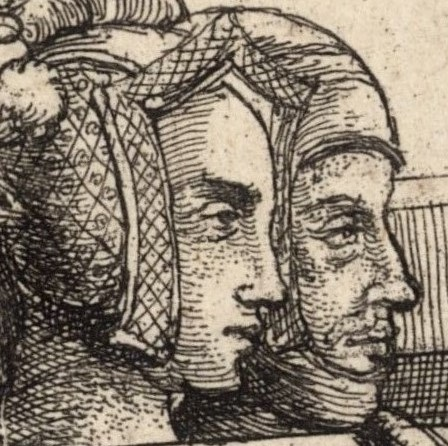
- The Duke and Duchess of Lancaster on their tomb monument in St Paul's Cathedral, as depicted in 1658 by Wenceslaus Hollar. Anachronistic inaccuracies include Blanche's early-16th-century-style gable headdress.
- Born: 25 March 1342; Bolingbroke Castle, Lincolnshire, Kingdom of England
- Died: 12 September 1368 (aged 26); Tutbury Castle, Staffordshire, Kingdom of England
- Burial: St Paul's Cathedral
- Spouse: John of Gaunt (m. 1359)
- Issue more...: Philippa, Queen of Portugal; Elizabeth, Duchess of Exeter; Henry IV, King of England
- House: Lancaster
- Father: Henry of Grosmont, Duke of Lancaster
- Mother: Isabel of Beaumont

Blanche of Lancaster (25 March 1342 – 12 September 1368) was a member of the English-French royal House of Lancaster and the daughter of the kingdom's wealthiest and most powerful peer, Henry of Grosmont, 1st Duke of Lancaster. She was the first wife of John of Gaunt, the mother of King Henry IV, and the grandmother of King Henry V of England.

== Lineage ==
Blanche was born on 25 March 1342, according to her father's inquisitions post mortem. (Note: According to the Derbyshire and Staffordshire jurors, the only ones to suggest an exact date, she was aged "19 years at the feast of Annunciation last" since May 1361, when the post mortem documents were compiled.) She is also said to have been born as late as 1347, but this has been called into question as that would mean she had her first child at only about age 13.

She was the younger daughter of Henry of Grosmont, 1st Duke of Lancaster, and his wife Isabel de Beaumont. She and her elder sister Maud, Countess of Leicester, were born at Bolingbroke Castle in Lindsey. Maud married Ralph Stafford, 1st Earl of Stafford, and then William I, Duke of Bavaria. Since Maud left no surviving children upon her death, her younger sister inherited the entirety of her father's titles and very considerable estates.

== Marriage ==
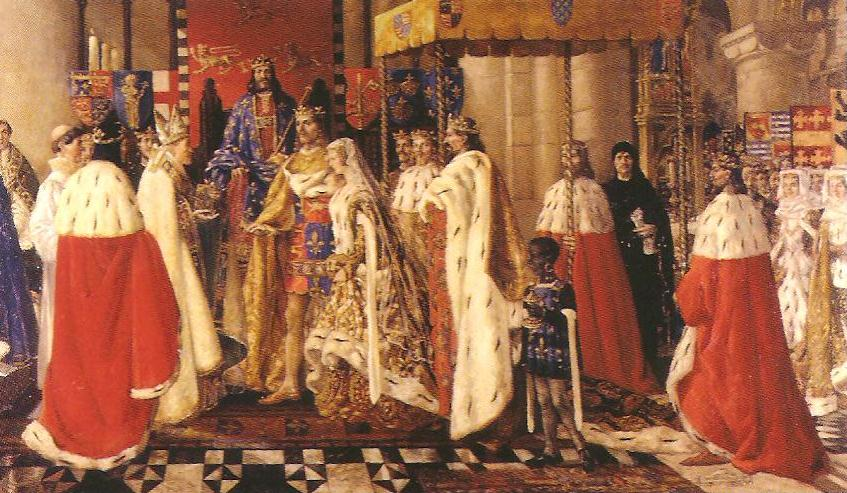
The Marriage of John of Gaunt and Blanche of Lancaster in Reading Abbey on 19 May 1359, by Horace Wright (1914), in the Museum of Reading

In 1347, Blanche was betrothed to John de Segrave while both were still children, but the proposed marriage never took place.

On 19 May 1359, at Reading Abbey, Reading, Berkshire, Blanche married her third cousin, John of Gaunt, fourth son of King Edward III. The whole royal family was present at the wedding, and the King gave Blanche expensive gifts of jewellery. The wealth she brought to the marriage was the foundation of John's fortune.

The title Duke of Lancaster became extinct upon her father's death without male heirs in 1361. However, as he was married to Blanche, John of Gaunt became Earl of Lancaster, Earl of Derby, Earl of Lincoln and Earl of Leicester, although he did not receive all of these titles until the death of Blanche's older sister, Maud, in 1362. The Duchy of Lancaster (second creation) was later bestowed on Gaunt. The influence associated with the titles would lead him to become Lord High Steward.

Jean Froissart described Blanche (following her death) as "jone et jolie" ("young and pretty"). Geoffrey Chaucer described "White" (the central figure in his Book of the Duchess, believed to have been inspired by Blanche: see below) in such terms as "rody, fresh, and lyvely hewed", her neck as "whyt, smothe, streght, and flat", and her throat as "a round tour of yvoire": she was "bothe fair and bright", and Nature's "cheef patron [pattern] of beautee".

Gaunt and Blanche's marriage is widely believed to have been happy, although there is little solid evidence for this. The assumption seems to be based on the fact that Gaunt chose to be buried with Blanche, despite his two subsequent marriages, and on the themes of love, devotion and grief expressed in Chaucer's poem (see below)—a rather circular argument, as it is partly on the basis of these themes that the couple's relationship is identified as the inspiration for the poem. Blanche and Gaunt had seven children, three of whom survived infancy.

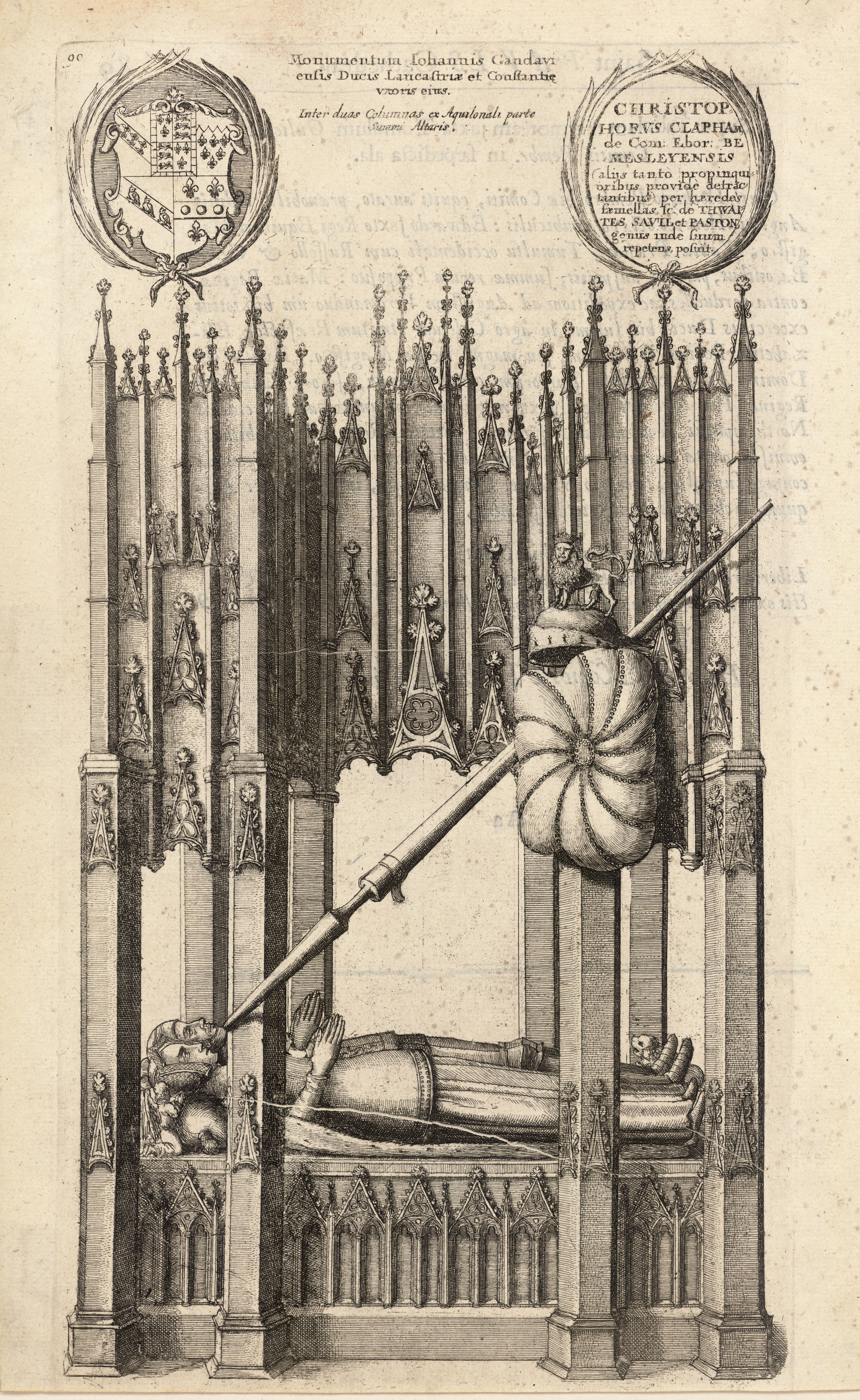
The tomb of Blanche and John of Gaunt in Old St Paul's Cathedral, as represented in an etching of 1658 by Wenceslaus Hollar. The etching includes a number of inaccuracies, for example in not showing the couple with joined hands

== Death and commemoration ==
Blanche died at Tutbury Castle, Staffordshire, on 12 September 1368 while her husband was overseas. Jean Froissart reported that she died aged about 22.

It is believed that she may have died after contracting the Black Death, which was rife in Europe at that time. Her funeral at Old St Paul's Cathedral in London was preceded by a magnificent cortège attended by most of the upper nobility and clergy. John of Gaunt held annual commemorations of her death for the rest of his life and established a joint chantry foundation on his own death.

In 1373, Froissart wrote a long poem, Le Joli Buisson de Jonece, commemorating both Blanche and Philippa of Hainault (Gaunt's mother, who had died in 1369).

It may have been for one of the anniversary commemorations of Blanche's death that Geoffrey Chaucer, then a young squire and mostly unknown writer of court poetry, was commissioned to write what became The Book of the Duchess in her honour. Though Chaucer's intentions can never be defined with absolute certainty, many believe that at least one of the aims of the poem was to make John of Gaunt see that his grief for his late wife had become excessive, and to prompt him to try to overcome it. (Chaucer was married to the sister of Katherine Swynford, Gaunt's lover, the mother of several of his children, and his eventual third wife.) The poem tells the story of the poet's dream. Wandering a wood, the poet discovers a knight clothed in black, and inquires of the knight's sorrow. The knight, perhaps representing Gaunt, is mourning a terrible tragedy, which may mirror Gaunt's own extended mourning for Blanche.

In 1374, six years after her death, John of Gaunt commissioned a double tomb for himself and Blanche from the mason Henry Yevele. The magnificent monument in the choir of Old St Paul's Cathedral was completed by Yevele in 1380, with the assistance of Thomas Wrek, having cost a total of £592. Gaunt himself died in 1399, and was laid to rest beside Blanche. The two effigies were notable for having their right hands joined. An adjacent chantry chapel was added between 1399 and 1403. However, the tomb of Blanche and Gaunt was destroyed in the Great Fire of London in 1666. A modern monument in the present-day St Paul's Cathedral lists her name amongst the important graves lost.

== Issue ==
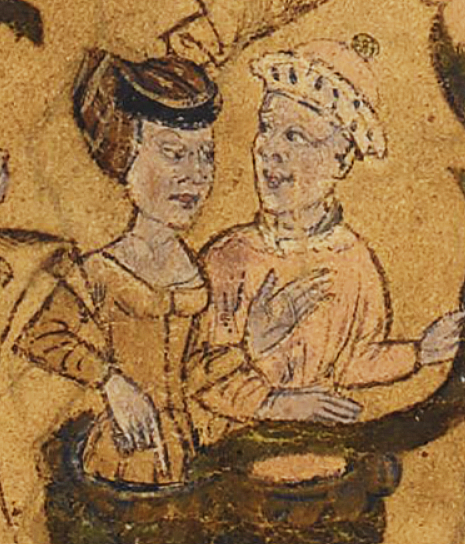
Blanche and John of Gaunt depicted in a 15th-century family tree of Henry VI

Blanche and John of Gaunt together had seven children, of whom three survived to adulthood:

- Philippa of Lancaster (31 March 1360 – 19 July 1415), wife of John I of Portugal
- John of Lancaster (c.1362/1364); died in early infancy
- Elizabeth of Lancaster (21 February 1363 – 24 November 1426); married, firstly, John Hastings, 3rd Earl of Pembroke; secondly, to John Holland, 1st Duke of Exeter; thirdly, to John Cornwall, 1st Baron Fanhope
- Edward of Lancaster (1365–1365)
- John of Lancaster (4 May 1366); died in early infancy
- Henry IV of England (15 April 1367 – 20 March 1413); married, firstly, Mary de Bohun and, secondly, Joanna of Navarre
- Isabel of Lancaster (b.1368); died young

== Ancestry ==
Ancestors of Blanche of Lancaster

8. Edmund Crouchback, 1st Earl of Lancaster
4. Henry, 3rd Earl of Lancaster
9. Blanche of Artois
2. Henry of Grosmont, 1st Duke of Lancaster
10. Patrick de Chaworth, Lord of Kidwelly
5. Maud Chaworth
11. Isabella de Beauchamp
1. Blanche of Lancaster
12. Louis de Brienne
6. Henry de Beaumont
13. Agnés de Beaumont
3. Isabel of Beaumont
14. Alexander Comyn, Sheriff of Aberdeen
7. Alice Comyn
15. Joan le Latimer
