= Adjoua Flore Kouamé =

Ivorian novelist

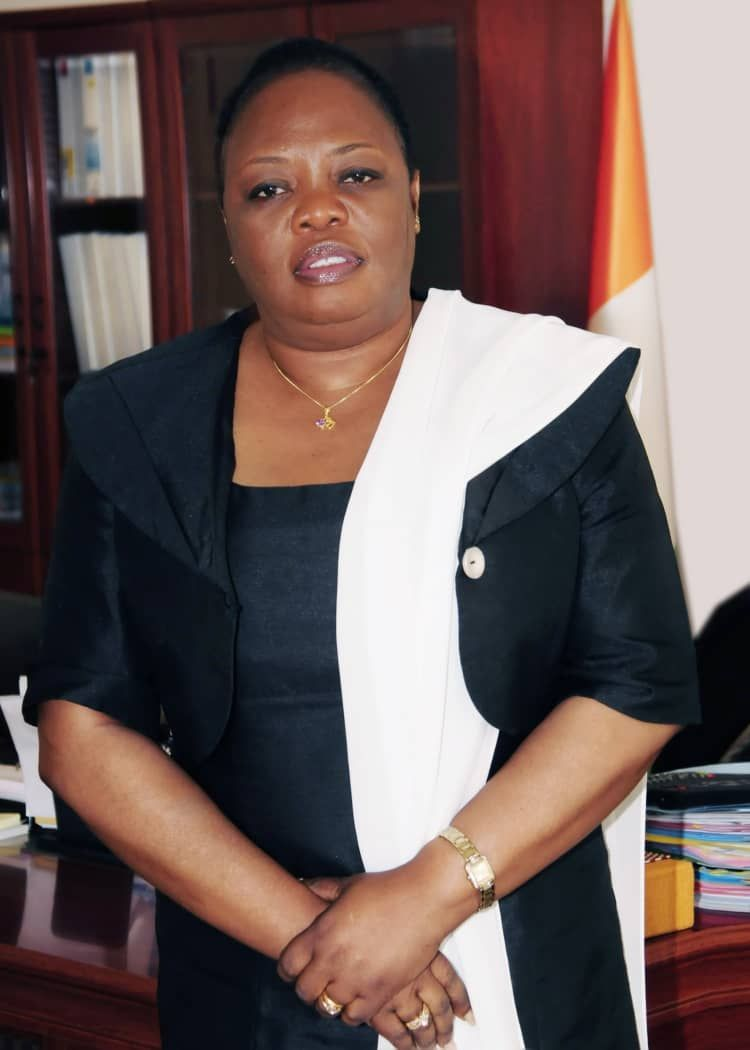
Image of Kouamé Adjoua Flore

Adjoua Flore Kouamé (born 1964, in Abidjan) is a novelist from Côte d'Ivoire.

== Life ==
Adjoua Flore Kouamé graduated with a master's degree in law from the National School of Administration, Côte d'Ivoire. In the 1990s, she became a civil administrator and deputy director at the Ministry of the Interior. In 2008, she held the position of Head of the Prime Minister's Office.

== Works ==
- La valse des tourments [The Merry-Go-Round of Torments], Abidjan: NEI, 1998. ISBN 2-911725-29-8
