= Fatou Bolli =

Ivorian writer

- Born: 1952 (age 73–74); Abidjan, Ivory Coast
- Occupation: Novelist

Fatou Bolli (born 1952) is an Ivorian novelist. She was the second published Ivorian woman writer with her 1976 novel Djigbô.

== Life and career ==
Bolli was born in 1952 in Abidjan, and worked for a period at the Agence de Coopération Culturelle et Technique in Paris.

Her 1976 novel Djigbô (published by the Centre d'édition et de diffusion africaines) dealt with the subject of witchcraft, a subject that has been rarely addressed in Ivorian literature. The book was only the second Ivorian book published by a woman writer, and sold well in bookstores on its release.

She has been described as among the best-known women writers of the Ivory Coast. She was one of only two women writers (the other being Simone Kaya, the first published woman Ivorian writer) included in l'Anthologie de la littérature ivoirienne (The Anthology of Ivorian Literature, 1983). Regina Yaou has said that both Bolli and Kaya experienced frustrations in entering the literary world.
