= Adjoua N'Dri =

Ivorian handball player

Personal information
- Nationality: Ivorian
- Born: 26 January 1965 (age 60)

Sport
- Sport: Handball

Adjoua N'Dri (born 26 January 1965) is an Ivorian handball player. She competed in the women's tournament at the 1988 Summer Olympics.
