= Bolingbroke Castle =

Norman Castle in Lincolnshire, England

- Part of Lincolnshire
- Bolingbroke, England
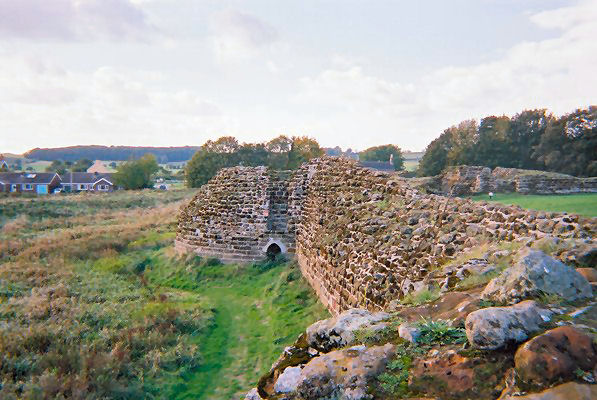
- The ruined walls of Bolingbroke Castle

Site information
- Type: Enclosure castle
- Owner: Henry Castle
- Controlled by: Heritage Lincolnshire
- Open to the public: yes
- Condition: Ruins

Location
- Coordinates: 53.1652°N 0.0170°E

Site history
- Built: c. 1220
- Built by: Ranulf, Earl of Chester
- In use: 13th to 15th century
- Materials: Spilsby Greenstone; Timber; Earth
- Demolished: c. 1652
- Battles/wars: Battle of Winceby
- Events: Birthplace of Henry of Bolingbroke

Bolingbroke Castle is a ruined castle in Bolingbroke (now Old Bolingbroke) in Lincolnshire, England.

== Construction ==
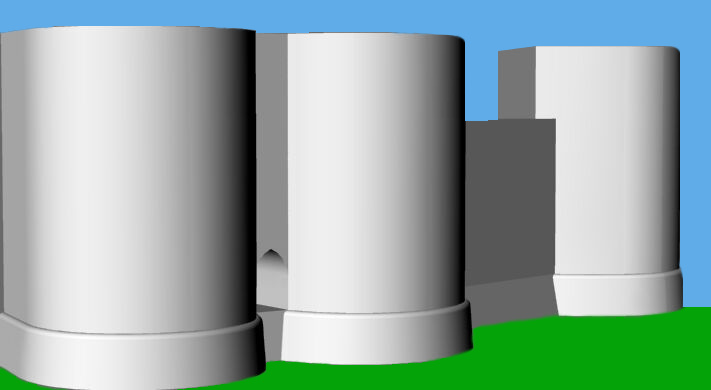
Reconstruction of the north face of the castle, showing the gatehouse

Most of the castle is built of Spilsby greenstone, as are several nearby churches. The local greenstone is a limestone that proved to be porous, prone to rapid deterioration when exposed to weather and a substandard building material. The castle was constructed as an irregular polygonal enclosure. The castle is one of the earliest examples of a uniform castle designed and built without a keep. It was originally surrounded by a large water-filled moat 31 metres (102 ft) wide. The curtain wall was up to 5 metres (16 ft) thick and defended by five D-shaped towers and a twin-towered gate house.

Similar to another castle built by Ranulf during the same period at Beeston in Cheshire, Bolingbroke had no inner defensive keep. The castle relied instead on thick walls and the five D-shaped defensive corner towers. Some design similarities are noted with the contemporary castle at Boulogne-sur-Mer, France that was also constructed without a central donjon.

== History ==
The area was first fortified by the Saxons in the 6th or 7th century. In the 12th century the Normans built a Motte-and-bailey on a nearby hill above the settlement of Bolingbroke. The present structure was founded by Ranulf, Earl of Chester, in 1220 shortly after he returned from the Fifth Crusade.

Ranulf died in 1232 without a male heir, and his titles, lands and castles passed to his sisters. Following the death of Henry of Grosmont, 1st Duke of Lancaster in 1361, Bolingbroke passed through marriage into the ownership of John of Gaunt. His wife Blanche of Lancaster, daughter of Henry of Grosmont, was born at the castle in 1342. John and Blanche's son, Henry (the future Henry IV), was also born at Bolingbroke Castle in 1367 and consequently was known as "Henry Bolingbroke" before he became king in 1399.

By the 15th and 16th century, the castle had fallen into disrepair although repairs were carried out during the Tudor period. The castle was used by auditors of the Duchy of Lancaster. Structures were named after the officials, including the "Receiver's Tower" and the "Feodary's Tower". Lead for the roof of the gatehouse was brought from an abandoned chapel at Trusthorpe. In 1636 a survey found that all of the towers were effectively beyond repair.

At the start of the First English Civil War, Bolingbroke was again put to use as a military fortification garrisoned by Royalist forces. In 1643, it was badly damaged in a siege during the Battle of Winceby. The following year, the castle was recaptured from the Parliamentarians, but due to defeats elsewhere was relinquished again. In 1652, the castle was slighted to prevent any further use. The towers and walls were torn down and dumped into the moat.

The last major structure collapsed in 1815.

== Present day ==
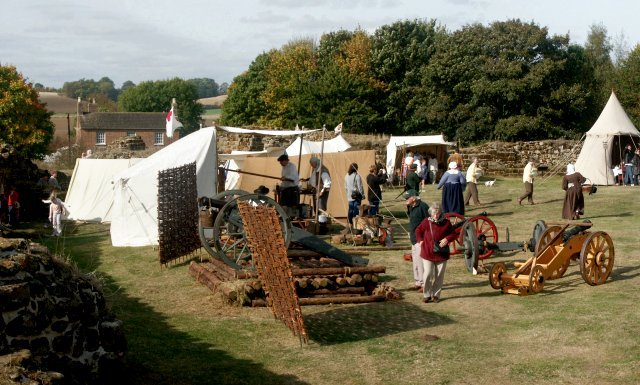
A major re-enactment in 2003 as part of a project to commemorate the 360th anniversary of the events of 1643

The castle, which is now a national monument, was excavated in the 1960s and 1970s. It was maintained by English Heritage until 1995 when Heritage Lincolnshire took charge. Much of the lower walls are still visible as are the ground floors of the towers.

In the summertime, the castle is home to numerous events including performances of Shakespeare.

== See also ==
- Castles in Great Britain and Ireland
- List of castles in England

== Sources ==
- Brown, A. L.; Summerson, Henry (2004). "Henry IV [known as Henry Bolingbroke]". Oxford Dictionary of National Biography (online ed.). Oxford University Press. doi:10.1093/ref:odnb/12951. (Subscription, Wikipedia Library access or UK public library membership required.)
- Matarasso, Francois (1995). The English Castle. London: Cassell. p. 224. ISBN 1-84067-230-7.
- Allen Brown, R.; Colvin, H. M.; Taylor, A. J. (1963). The history of the King's Works: the Middle Ages. Vol. 2. London: Her Majesty's Stationery Office. pp. 571–2.
- Sylvanius Urban (1821). "Bolingbroke Castle". Gentleman's Magazine and Historical Review. Vol. 91 part 2. London: John Harris & Son. p. 305.
- Drewett P. L.; Freke D. J. (1974). "The Great Hall at Bolingbroke Castle, Lincolnshire" (PDF). Notes and News. Medieval Archaeology. 18: 163–165. doi:10.5284/1071570.
- Thompson, M. W. (1966). "The Origins of Bolingbroke Castle" (PDF). Notes and News. Medieval Archaeology. 10: 152–158. doi:10.5284/1071452.
- —— (1969). "Further Work at Bolingbroke Castle" (PDF). Notes and News. Medieval Archaeology. 13: 216–217. doi:10.5284/1071496.
