= Simone Kaya =

Ivorian writer (1937–2007)

Personal details
- Born: 11 February 1937 Bouaflé
- Died: 7 June 2007 (aged 70)
- Citizenship: Ivory Coast
- Occupation: nurse, writer

Simone Kaya

(February 11, 1937 – June 7, 2007) was an Ivorian writer and nurse. She is considered a pioneer among women writers in Ivory Coast, the first woman to enter the country's literary sphere.

== Biography ==
Kaya was born Simone Lucrece Lamizana in 1937 in Bouaflé, Ivory Coast. Her family was originally from French Upper Volta, now Burkina Faso, and spoke Dioula, Samo, and Baoulé as well as French. Her father wanted his daughters to learn to read and write, so he sent her off to school in Bocanda.

At age 13, Kaya left for France, where she studied to become a nurse. On returning to Africa, she settled in Brazzaville, then Yaoundé, and finally Abidjan, where she worked as a nurse and social worker. She also became the first woman to lead the National Institute of Social Training (INFS) in Ivory Coast.

Kaya is considered the first Ivorian woman writer. She published two French-language autobiographical novels in 1976 and 1984, in which she tells not only the story of her own life but also the story of a generation of Ivorian women. As Cheikh Hamidou Kane writes in the preface to her first novel, Les Danseuses d'Impé-eya:

"What attracts and retains one's interest while reading Les Danseuses ... is the vision that is presented to us of the African landscape, its people, its nature, its history; through the gaze and the sensibility of one African woman belonging to one of those pivotal generations between the colonial era and the era of independent states. ... Simon Kaya tells her own story and, at the same time, tells our story."

In addition to her work as a nurse and writer, Kaya was a women's rights activist and committed feminist. She died in Ouagadougou in 2007.

== Selected works ==
- Les Danseuses d'Impé-eya: Jeunes filles à Abidjan (1976)
- Le Prix d'une vie (1984)
