= Blanche of England =

English princess (1392–1409)

- Portrait above Blanche's tomb in Neustadt an der Weinstraße
- Born: Spring 1392; Peterborough Castle, Northamptonshire, Kingdom of England
- Died: 22 May 1409 (aged 16-17); Free Imperial City of Haguenau, Holy Roman Empire
- Burial: St Mary's at Neustadt, Electorate of the Palatinate
- Spouse: Louis III, Elector Palatine (m. 1402)
- Issue: Rupert
- House: Lancaster
- Father: Henry IV of England
- Mother: Mary de Bohun

Blanche of England (spring 1392 – 22 May 1409), also known as Blanche of Lancaster, was a member of the House of Lancaster, the daughter of King Henry IV of England and his first wife Mary de Bohun.

== Family ==
Born at Peterborough Castle (now in Cambridgeshire), Blanche was the fifth of the six children born during the marriage of Henry of Lancaster and his wife Mary de Bohun. At the time of her birth, Henry was the Earl of Derby and, thanks to his marriage, Earl of Northampton and Earl of Hereford; as the only surviving son of John of Gaunt and Blanche of Lancaster, he was the heir of the Duchy of Lancaster. Blanche was named after her paternal grandmother Blanche of Lancaster, the first wife of John of Gaunt.

Blanche's mother died on 4 June 1394 in Peterborough Castle after giving birth to her last child, Philippa. Five years later, on 30 September 1399, Blanche's father deposed his cousin Richard II and usurped the throne. The new king remarried to Joanna of Navarre, daughter of King Charles II of Navarre and widow of Duke John IV of Brittany. There were no surviving children from this marriage.

== Marriage ==
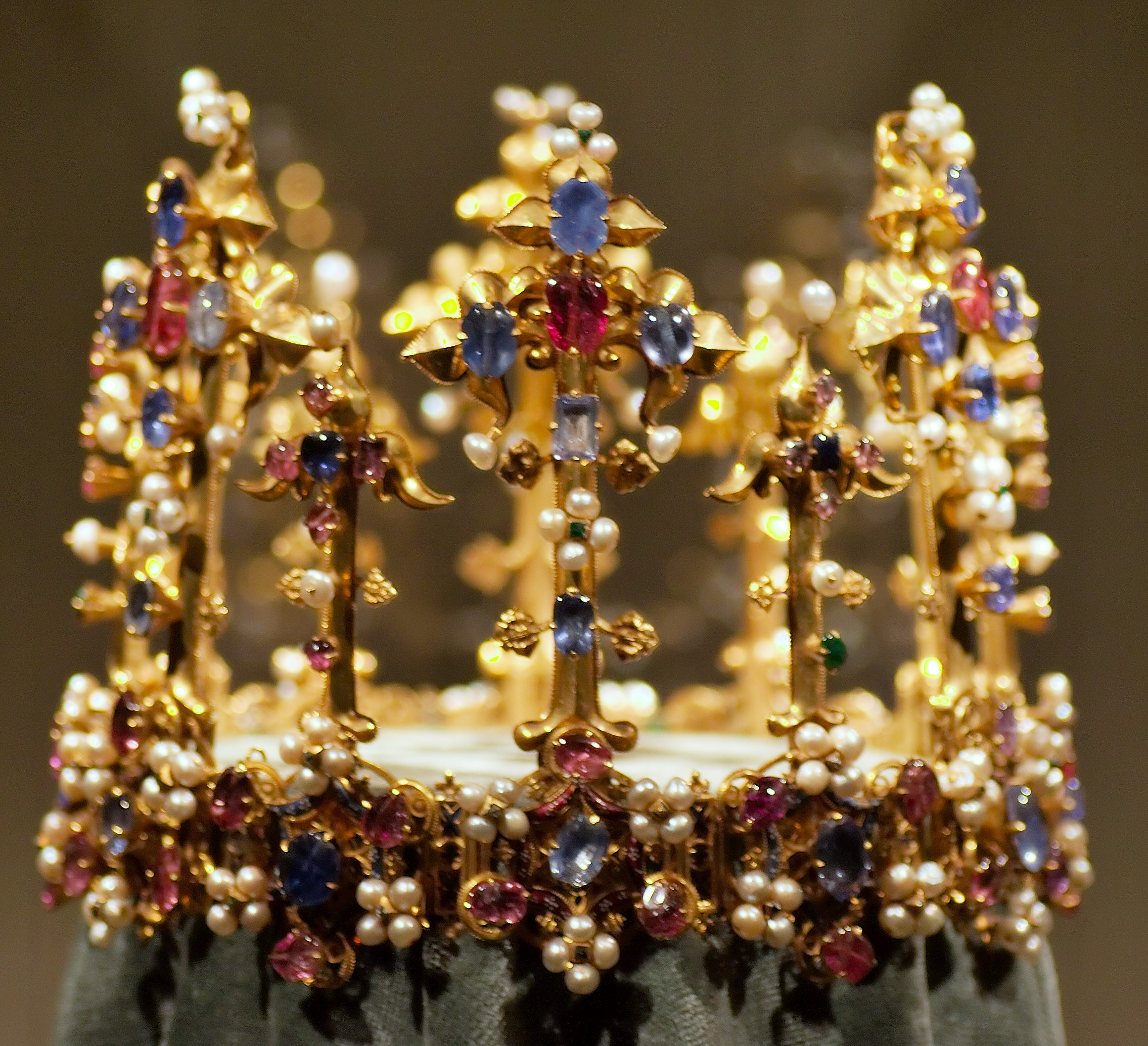
The Crown of Princess Blanche, kept at Munich Residenz

In January 1401 Henry IV held a tournament at Eltham Palace to honour the visit of Manuel II Palaiologos. The tournament was commemorated in literary form as thirteen letters in old French addressed to Blanche. Each letter, supposedly written by a legendary patron, praises one of the combatants. The letters were probably read aloud during the event.

After his accession to the English throne, King Henry IV wanted to make important alliances in order to maintain and legitimise his rule. One needed ally was King Rupert of Germany, who had also ascended following his predecessor's deposition: a marriage between Rupert's eldest surviving son Louis and Henry IV's eldest daughter Blanche was soon arranged.

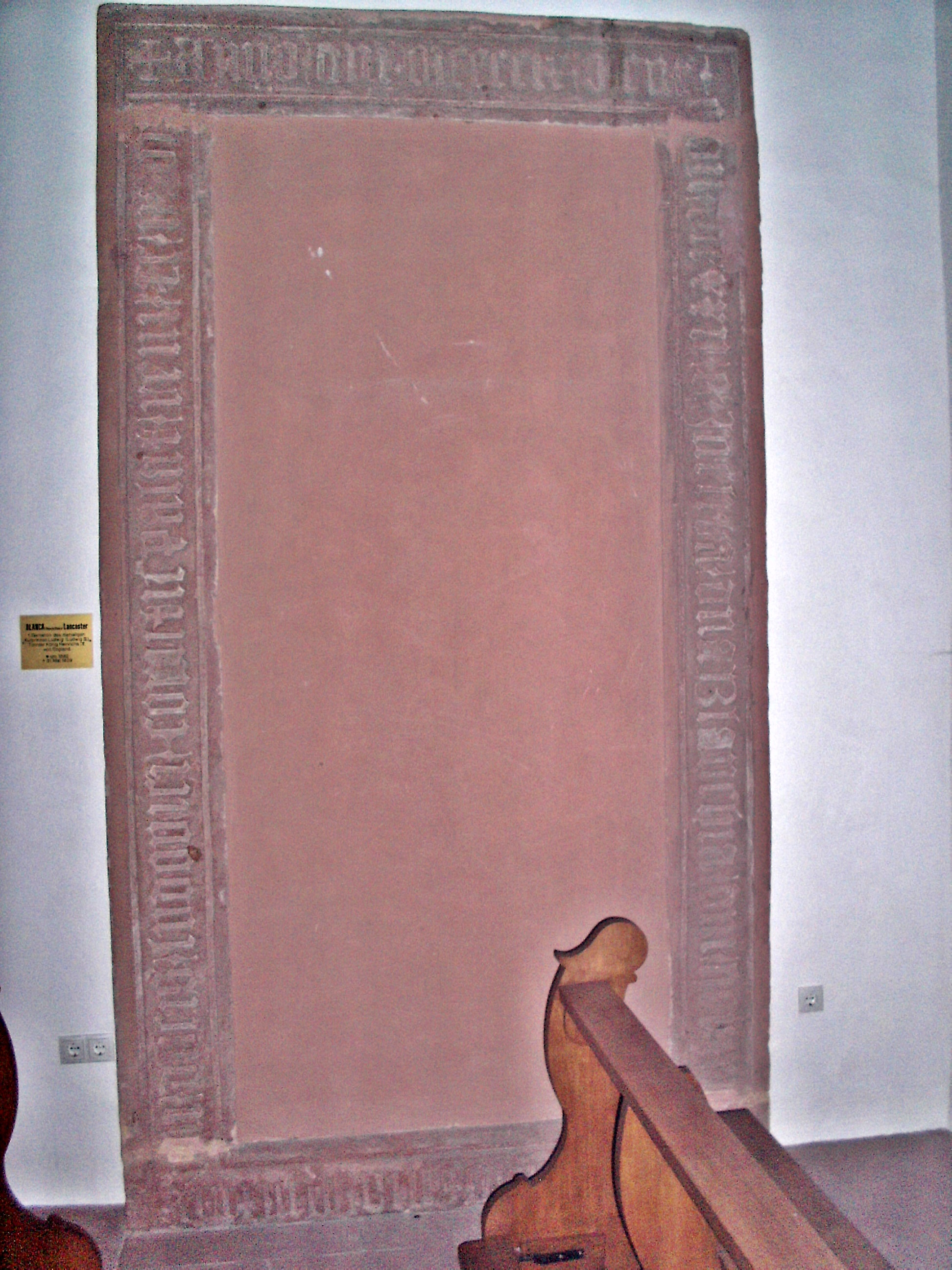
Blanche's restored tombstone at the church in Neustadt an der Weinstraße

The marriage contract was signed on 7 March 1401 in London; the bride's dowry was fixed in the amount of 40,000 Nobeln (over 300 kg of gold). The formal marriage between Blanche and Louis took place on 6 July 1402 at Cologne Cathedral, Germany. Blanche's dowry included the oldest surviving royal crown known to have been in England. Despite its political nature, the marriage was said to be happy. On 22 June 1406, she gave birth to a son named Rupert. Exactly one year later, on 22 June 1407, Blanche gave birth to a stillborn child.

In 1408 Blanche was made Lady of the Garter. One year later, she died while pregnant with her third child and was buried in the Church of St. Mary (today St. Aegidius) in Neustadt in the Palatinate. The child did not survive.

Her widower became Elector Palatine as Louis III in 1410 after the death of his father King Rupert and in 1417 married Matilda, daughter of Amadeo, Prince of Achaea, member of the House of Savoy, who bore him five children. Blanche's son Rupert (nicknamed the English) died aged nineteen in 1426, unmarried and without issue.

== Ancestry ==
Ancestors of Blanche of England

8. Edward III of England
4. John of Gaunt, 1st Duke of Lancaster
9. Philippa of Hainault
2. Henry IV of England
10. Henry of Grosmont, 1st Duke of Lancaster
5. Blanche of Lancaster
11. Isabel of Beaumont
1. Blanche of England
12. William de Bohun, 1st Earl of Northampton
6. Humphrey de Bohun, 7th Earl of Hereford
13. Elizabeth de Badlesmere
3. Mary de Bohun
14. Richard FitzAlan, 10th Earl of Arundel
7. Joan FitzAlan
15. Eleanor of Lancaster

== Sources ==
- Harriss, Gerald (2005). Shaping the Nation: England 1360-1461. Oxford University Press.
- Ogden, Jack (2018). Diamonds: An Early History of the King of Gems. Yale University Press.
- Panton, Kenneth J. (2011). Historical Dictionary of the British Monarchy. Scarecrow Press.
- Walther Holtzmann: Die englische Heirat Pfalzgraf Ludwigs III., in: Zeitschrift für die Geschichte des Oberrheins No 43 (1930), pp. 1–22.
- The English Marriage of Elector Palatine Louis III
- The Crown of Princess Blanka in the Munich Treasury Residence
- Mortimer, Ian (2007). The Fears of Henry IV. Random.
