= Coronation of James II and VII and Mary =

1685 coronation in England

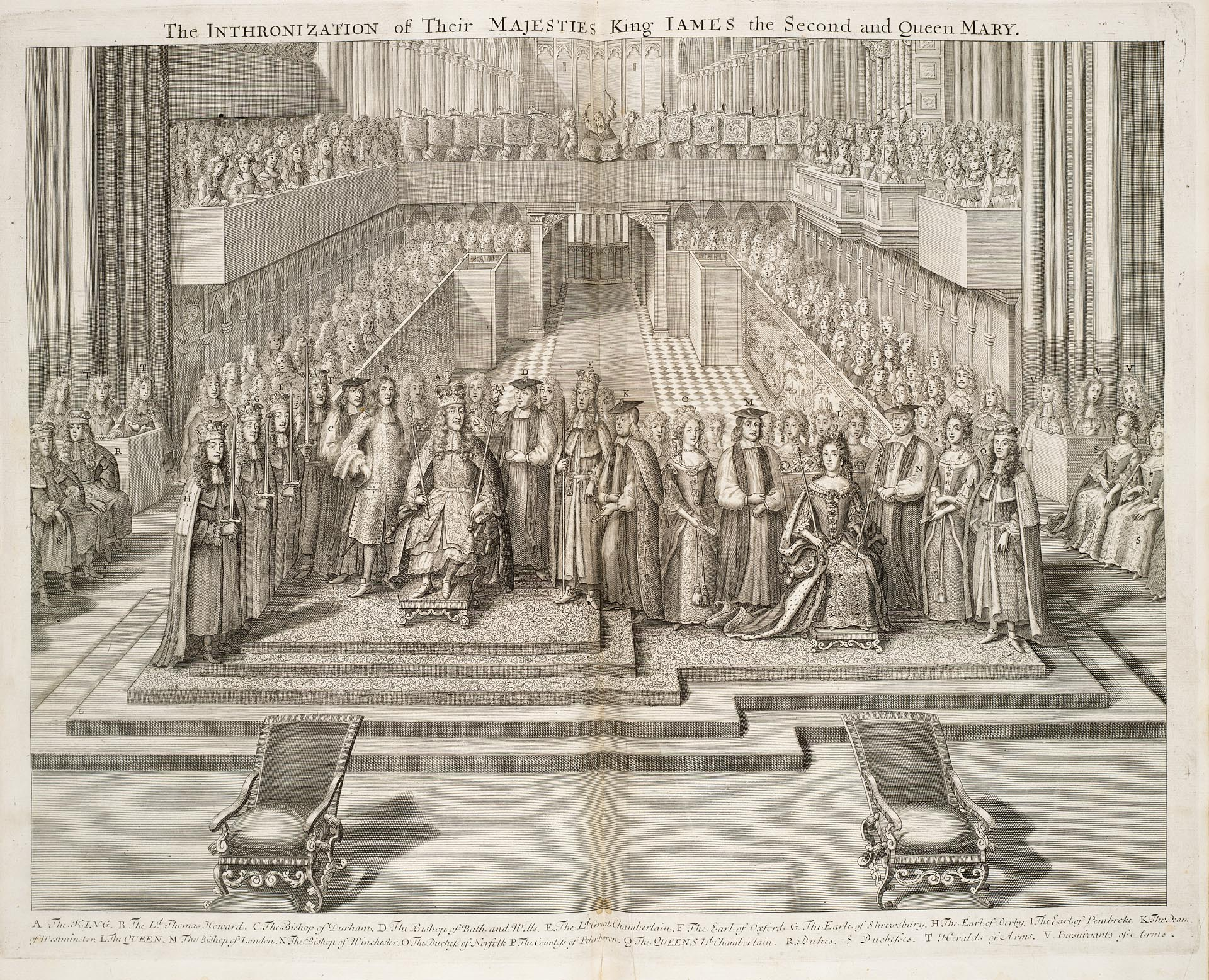
- James and Mary enthroned; an illustration from Francis Sandford's account.
- Date: 23 April 1685; 341 years ago
- Location: Westminster Abbey, London, England
- Participants: King James II and VII; Queen Mary; Great Officers of State; Bishops of the Church of England; Peers of England, Scotland and Ireland

The coronation of James II and VII and his wife Mary as King and Queen of England, Scotland and Ireland was held on 23 April 1685 at Westminster Abbey. James and Mary were the last British monarchs to be Catholics, despite the Protestant Church of England being the established church. Accordingly, the service was reordered to omit the Anglican Communion Service, the only time that a British coronation has been conducted without one. The truncated text of the coronation liturgy which was prepared for the service provided the model for future coronations into the 20th century. James was also the first monarch since the Union of the Crowns not to have a coronation in Scotland, and the first English monarch since the 14th century not to plan a royal entry procession through London, these and other innovations set long-standing precedents for future British coronations.

== Background ==
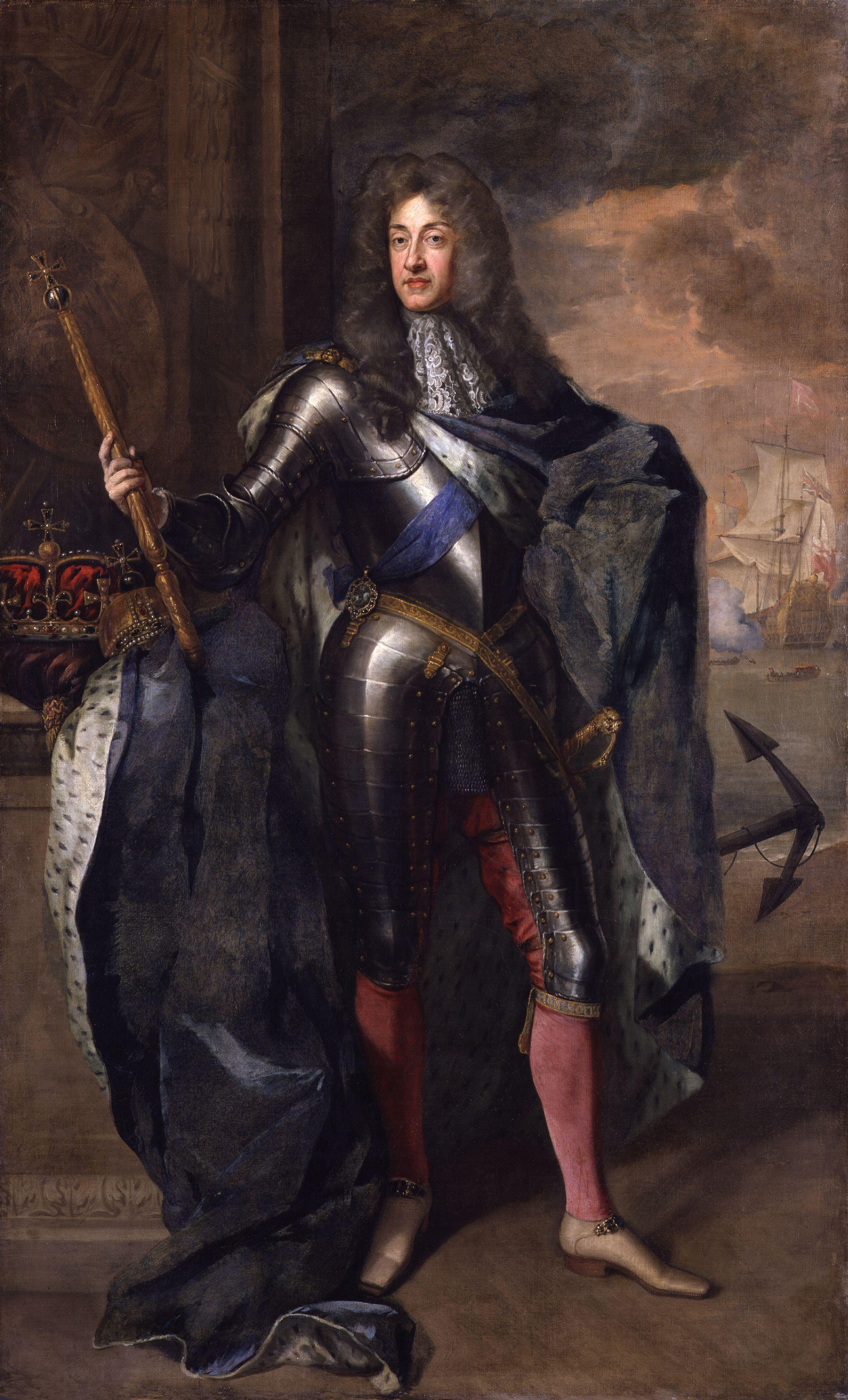
Portrait of James when Duke of York in 1684, by Godfrey Kneller.

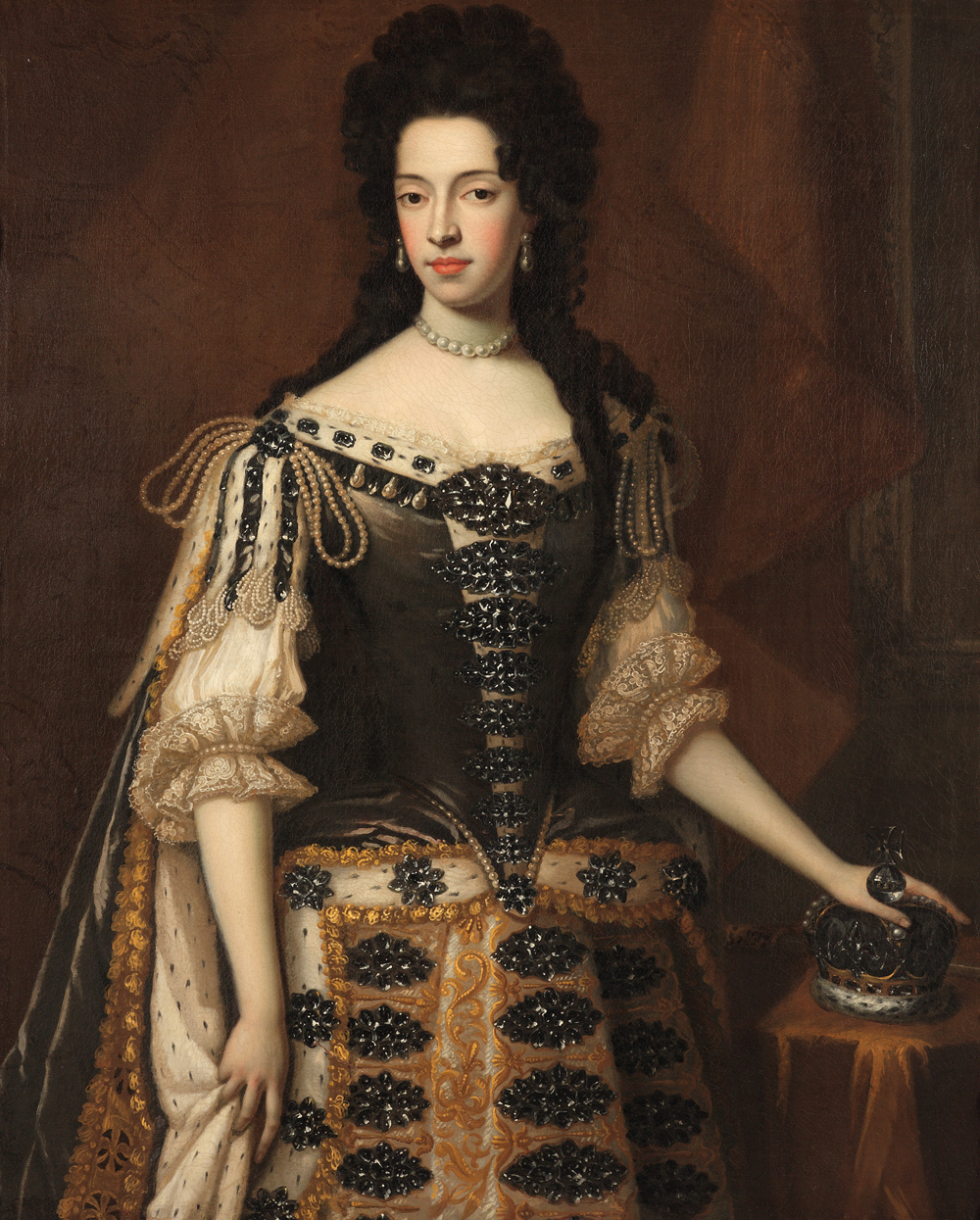
Mary of Modena in c. 1687 after her coronation as queen consort, a portrait by Godfrey Kneller.

James's predecessor and elder brother, King Charles II, had come to the throne in the 1660 Stuart Restoration, which followed the English Civil Wars, the execution of Charles I and the five year republic known as The Protectorate. Charles II had a difficult relationship with the Parliament of England over religious policy. Charles supported the High Church wing of the Church of England which inclined towards Catholic traditions, while many in Parliament, calling themselves "the Country Party" (later known as Whigs), were Protestant-minded and strongly anti-Catholic. In 1673, Parliament passed the Test Act 1673, which required anyone holding public office to take an oath afirning their adherence to Protestantism. James, then Duke of York, refused to take the oath, which publicly revealed the fact that James had secretly converted to Catholicism. This provoked the Exclusion Crisis, when Parliament attempted to pass bills that would exclude James from the throne, because they feared that a Catholic monarch, like Louis XIV of France, would rule as an autocrat and restrict Protestant freedom of worship. The perceived threat was amplified by a fictitious conspiracy theory called the Popish Plot. However, the King's supporters in the House of Lords, known as the Tories, were able to block the exclusion bills and in 1681, Charles prorogued Parliament and never called another one. By 1684, Charles's parliamentary opponents were either exiled in the Netherlands or had been deprived of their posts. A large royal army was camped just outside London on Putney Heath as a safeguard.

On 2 February 1685, King Charles II became seriously ill. Fearing a move by the exiles in the Netherlands, the government immediately closed the ports, arrested political opponents and put troops on standby. Charles died on 6 February. James immediately summoned the Privy Council and gave an impassioned speech promising to "preserve this Government both in Church and State as it is now by Law Establish'd". The relieved council had a transcript published in the London Gazette, from where it was read by the clergy from the pulpit to their congregations. The date of the coronation was set for 23 April, Saint George's Day, leaving only a few weeks for preparation; the French ambassador noted that James believed the coronation would put his accession beyond dispute. For the first time for the Stuart dynasty, there was to be no Scottish coronation, on the grounds that the Scottish Succession Act 1681 appeared to remove the need for one. The late King Charles, who had converted to Catholicism on his deathbed, was given a discrete private funeral after dark on 14 February.

== Preparation ==
As was the usual procedure, a Coronation Committee was convened shortly after the accession. In attendance were the King, representatives of the College of Heralds, and officers of state such as the Lord Great Chamberlain, the Lord High Treasurer, the Master of the Great Wardrobe, and most importantly, the Earl Marshal, who had overall charge of the planning. At the first meeting, James ordered that a lavish and detailed record of the coronation be made, a work undertaken by Francis Sandford, the Lancaster Herald, assisted by Gregory King, the Rouge Dragon Pursuivant. The book that they produced, The History of the Coronation of the most High, most Mighty, and most Excellent Monarch, James II, was the first complete record of the ceremony to survive and includes not only a meticulous description but is lavishly illustrated by engravings, plans and diagrams. A function of the committee is to establish a Court of Claims to confirm those who claimed the right to perform ceremonial functions at the coronation, which conferred status and sometimes valuable rewards on the successful applicants; the court first met at the Palace of Westminster on 24 March and closed on 9 April, only a fortnight before the event itself.

For the first time since 1377, there was no consideration given to holding a royal entry procession through the City of London. The exact reason why the tradition was abandoned was not recorded, but later suggestions include that James preferred to spend the money on jewels for his consort, that there was insufficient time for preparation, or that the ostentation of these processions had gone out of fashion. However, a more probable reason was that the Protestant-minded City had been a leading force in the Exclusion Crisis, resulting in the loss of their royal charter and the purging of opponents in the City elite, thus making the reception of such a grand event within London's walls problematic. The alternative adopted was to be a spectacular public firework display on the Thames opposite Whitehall Palace on the night of the coronation.

=== Liturgy ===
The task of compiling the coronation liturgy fell to the Archbishop of Canterbury, William Sancroft. James required Sancroft to "review the Forms of Divine Service used at former Coronations, and (keeping to the Essentials) to abridge, as much as might be, the extream length thereof". The subtext of this order was the omission of the Holy Communion or Eucharist from the service, which had been a fundamental part of English coronations since records began, so as not to compromise James's Catholic beliefs. An added complication was the need to include the coronation of a queen consort; James had married Mary, the daughter of Alfonso IV, Duke of Modena, in a proxy marriage in 1673.

Sancroft was aided in the project by six other bishops, who consulted not only the last major revision to the coronation liturgy, the 14th century Liber Regalis, but also the records of the post-Reformation coronations beginning with that of James I and Anne in 1603. Besides deleting much material, Sancroft also amended some of the blessings of objects to become blessings of the King and Queen, so as to conform with Anglican theology. The resulting abridgement was described by the church historian Jocelyn Perkins as "revolutionary vandalism", but Sancroft's text (with Communion reinstated) became the model for future British coronations into the 20th century.

=== Infrastructure ===
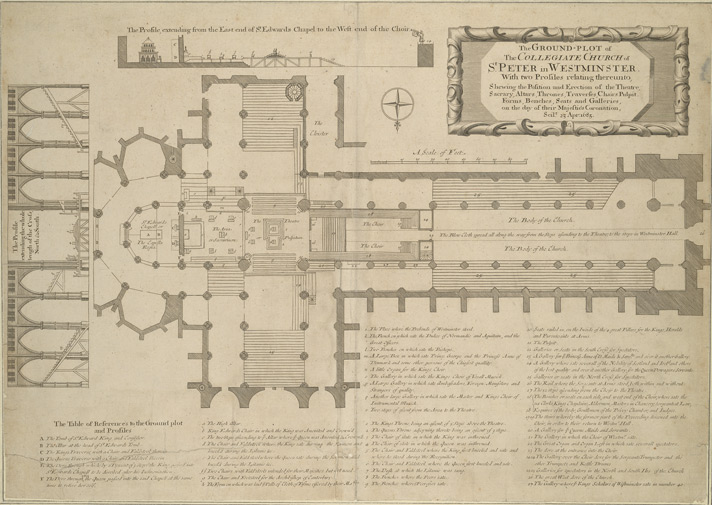
Sandford's plan of Westmister Abbey and the temporary structures built for the coronation.

The Coronation Committee also oversaw the required infrastructure for the event, which was carried out by the Office of Works. Fortunately, the Surveyor of the King's Works was Sir Christopher Wren, who had also fulfilled that function at the previous coronation in 1661. Sanford's detailed account provides for the first time the exact layout prepared for the coronation, both in the abbey and in Westminster Hall where the event would start and conclude. In the abbey, the area where the coronation ceremonies would take place was located at the crossing where the four arms of the cruciform church meet and was known as the "theatre". Here, a raised wooden platform 40 feet (12 m) long, 50 feet (15 m) wide and 8 feet (2.4 m) tall was surmounted by a further stepped platform or pulpitum for the king's and queen's thrones. Tiered seating supported on wooden scaffolding filled the north and south transepts; further galleries filled the chancel arcades to accommodate foreign dignatories, the musicians and choir, and for the first time, the Scottish and Irish peers, while the less distinguished were seated high in the triforium. The nave was also filled with galleries, although those who had paid for a seat there would have only seen the entry and recessional processions, and be able to hear little except the music. Westminster Hall had to be cleared for the traditional coronation banquet, it being normally partitioned into separate courtrooms. Galleries were constructed along each side for spectators. At the southern end, a canopied dais hung about with rich tapestries was built for the king and queen, while at the opposite end, a painted wood and board triumphal arch was installed.

James had established a Catholic chapel at Whitehall Palace and it was there that James and Mary are believed to have been privately anointed and crowned by his chaplain on the night before the official Anglican coronation.

== Procession ==
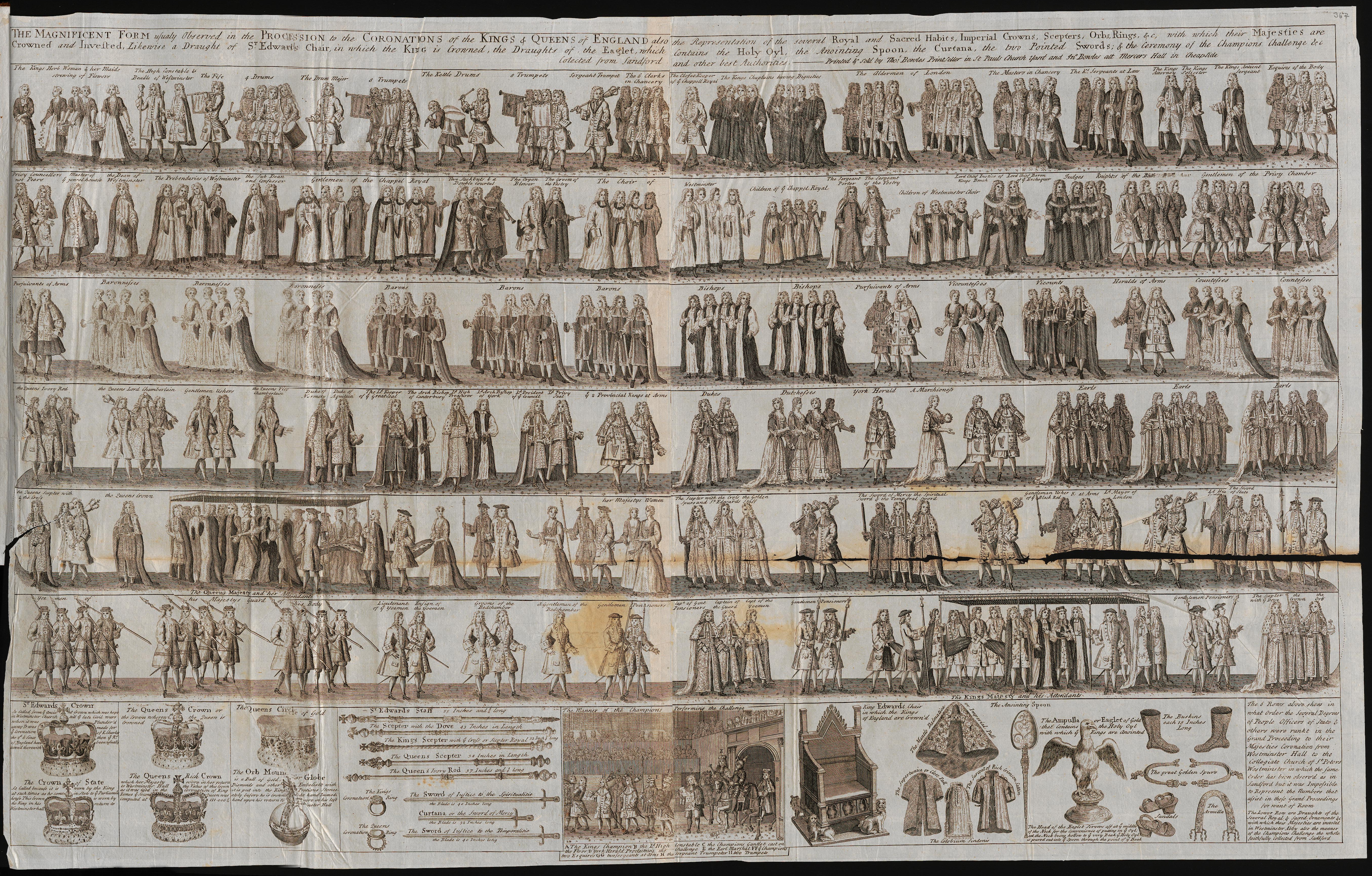
One of the illustrations of the coronation procession in Sandford's account.

On 23 April, the ceremonies started at Westminster Hall. Participants had to be in their places by 8 am. The King and Queen arrived at 11.30, after the short journey by barge from Whitehall Palace. The crown jewels and regalia were brought to the hall in procession by the Dean and Chapter of Westminster Abbey, where they were ceremonially distributed to their rightful bearers. The processional route from hall to the crossing of the abbey via New Palace Yard and King Street (now one side of Parliament Square) was covered with blue cloth to a total length of 1,220 yards (1,120 m), bounded by wooden rails and ranks of Foot and Horse Guards. Sandford's book illustrates the entire procession in nineteen detailed engravings, showing first King's Herb Woman and then the peers, clergy and heralds, with the King and Queen walking under canopies borne by the Barons of the Cinque Ports, one of whom was the diarist Samuel Pepys. The 15-minute procession included the choirs of the Chapel Royal and Westminster Abbey together with drummers and trumpeters, who sang an anthem, O Lord, grant the King a long life, probably composed by William Child for the 1661 coronation.

== Service ==
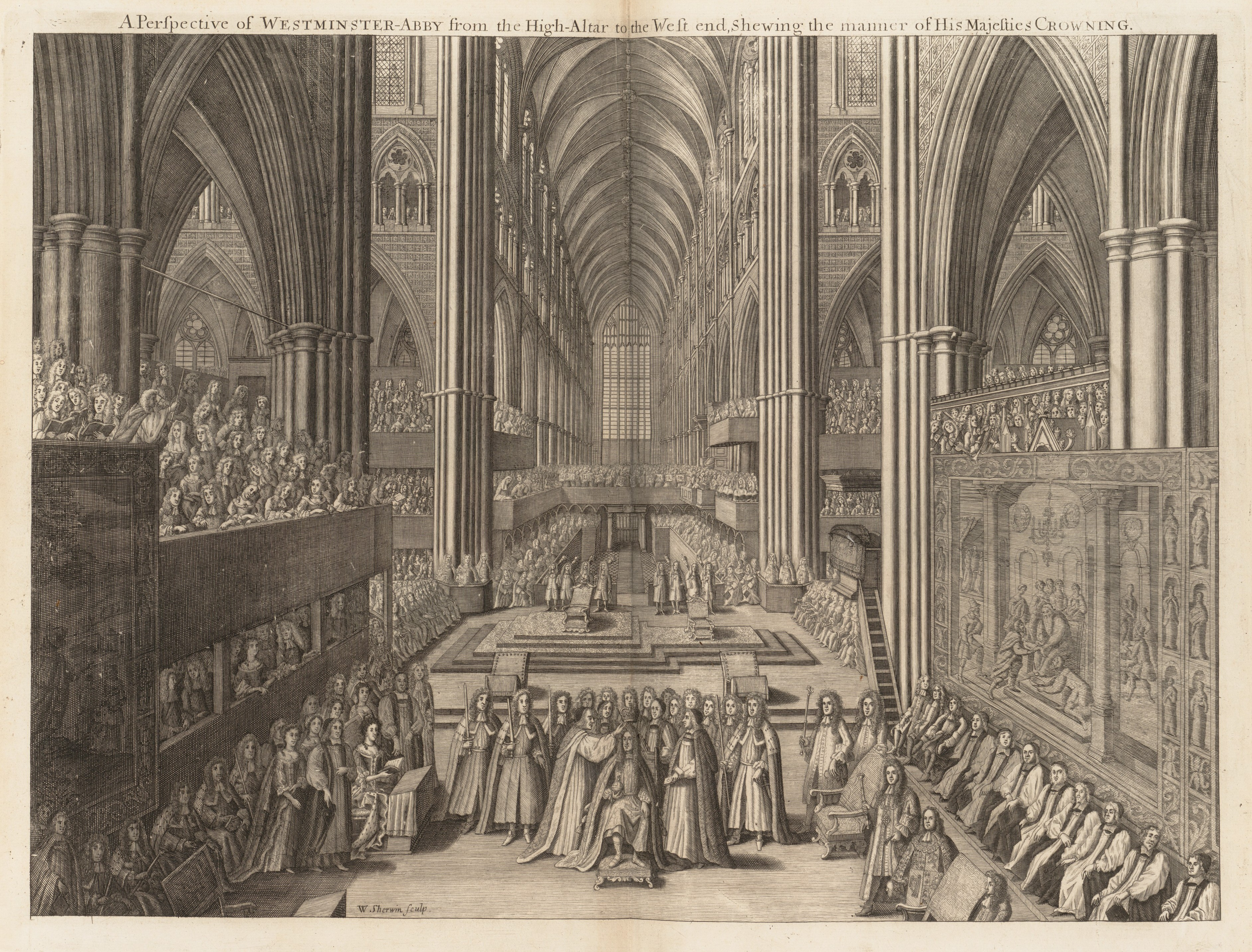
Archbishop Sancroft crowns James II.

The king's entrance was accompanied by the anthem I was glad, based on Psalm 122, a text that had been first used at the coronation of Charles I in 1626. There is some doubt about the composer, since Sandford attributes it to Henry Purcell, but the manuscript of the music that is generally accepted to have been used is attributed to John Blow. The music is in three distinct sections, and the first break may have allowed the choir to make their way from the procession into their gallery. It is probably in this gap that the now customary Vivats were performed for the first recorded time by the King's Scholars of Westminster School. As the Queen entered the choir, she was greeted with the acclamation; "VIVAT REGINA MARIA" and the King following with "VIVAT JACOBUS REX". Sandford says that the Vivats were sung, but it is not known what tune was used; musicologist Matthias Range speculates that it may have been an early version of God save the King. It is unknown if Vivats were used at previous coronations, but a Tudor version by Thomas Ashwell survives.

Sancroft's re-ordering of the service resulted in the abandoning of several historical prayers, moving the litany to precede the coronation oath and moving Veni Creator Spiritus to before the sermon. This was preached by Francis Turner, the Bishop of Ely, who campared James to Charles I whom he extolled as a martyr. Another amendment to the traditional format was the moving of the investment with the coronation ring and the Sceptre with Dove to after the crowning, probably to emphasise that the whole investiture was important.

=== Music ===
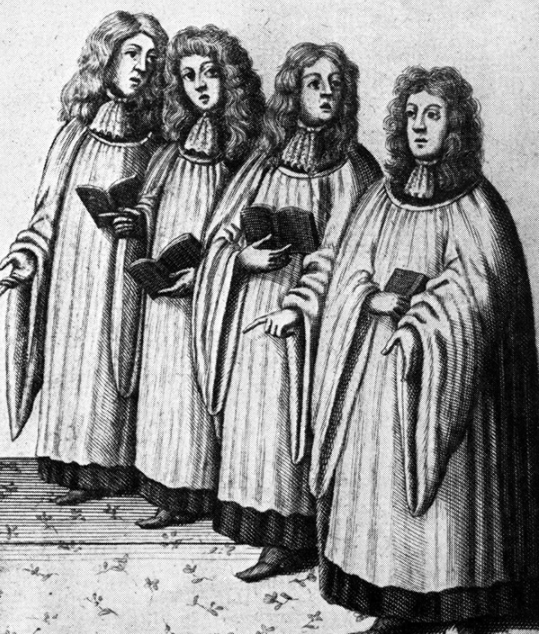
Four gentlemen of the Westmister Abbey choir in the coronation procession.

The 1685 coronation is notable amongst early modern coronations for the number of composers that contributed, although with no attempt to follow a single style or theme. The responsibility for organising the coronation music apparently rested with John Blow, the Master of the Children of the Chapel Royal, as he was given "Five Yards of fine Scarlet Cloth for his Mantle as Composer". A "little organ" was installed in the choir gallery and removed afterwards; it was played by Francis Forcer the Elder, who also replaced Blow singing in the choir while the latter was conducting. The combined choirs of the Chapel Royal and Westminster Abbey totalled twenty boy trebles and forty-eight gentlemen, who were accompanied by an orchestra of thirty-six musicians. Listed amongst the Chapel Royal basses was the composer Henry Purcell, who was also the abbey organist, although there is no evidence that the great organ was played during the coronation.

Aside from the entrance anthem described above, other notable music included; an anthem, Let thy hand be strengthened, based on Psalm 89 and composed by Blow, Come, Holy Ghost, our souls inspire, a translation of Veni Creator in an Anglican chant setting by William Turner, and at the anointing, Zadok the Priest, in a setting by Henry Lawes, probably the one that had been used at the previous coronation. The anointing ended with a new anthem by Blow, Behold, O God our defender and the King's crowning was followed by The King shall rejoice from Psalm 21 in a lost setting by Turner. The procession from St Edward's Chair to the throne was accompanied by the Te Deum in a chant by William Child. For the homage, a new text was taken from Psalm 89, 'God spake sometime in visions, composed by Blow and perhaps chosen because of the verse, "I will set his Domination also in the Sea: And his Right Hand in the Floods", which may have been a reference to James's previous success as Lord High Admiral of England.

There were no precedents for music for the crowning of Queen Mary, since the records of the previous queen consort's coronations in 1603 and 1625 made no mention of any. The anthem, My heart is inditing, was composed by Purcell. Sancroft chose texts from Psalm 45 with additional single verses from Psalm 147 and the Book of Isiah. The anthem is in three distinct parts, the first for the Queen's procession to the throne next to the King, and the second and third while both were seated enthroned. The opening text of the second part may be seen as a veiled warning by Sancroft to the foreign Catholic queen of a Protestant kingdom; "Hearken, O daughter, and consider, incline thine ear: forget also thine own people, and thy father's house". The third section was written in a major key by Purcell, providing a grand finale to the whole ceremony.

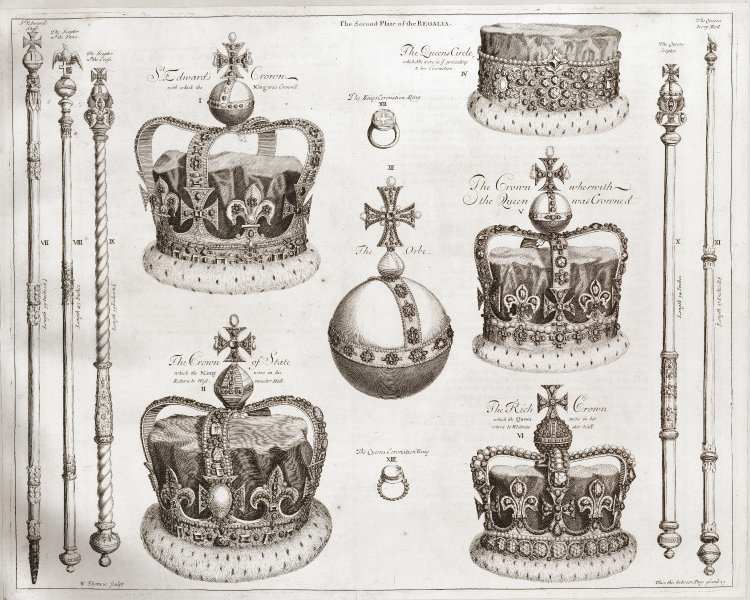
The regalia used at the 1685 coronation.

=== Regalia ===
The Crown Jewels of England had been remade in 1661, following the destruction of the medieval originals during the Commonwealth of England. There having been no queen consort's coronations since the Restoration, a new state crown was made for Mary, along with a circlet or diadem to be worn in the procession to the abbey. The total cost of the queen's jewels was £35,000 despite the gem stones being hired, a figure described by the Duke of Albemarle as "an immense summ".

== Banquet ==
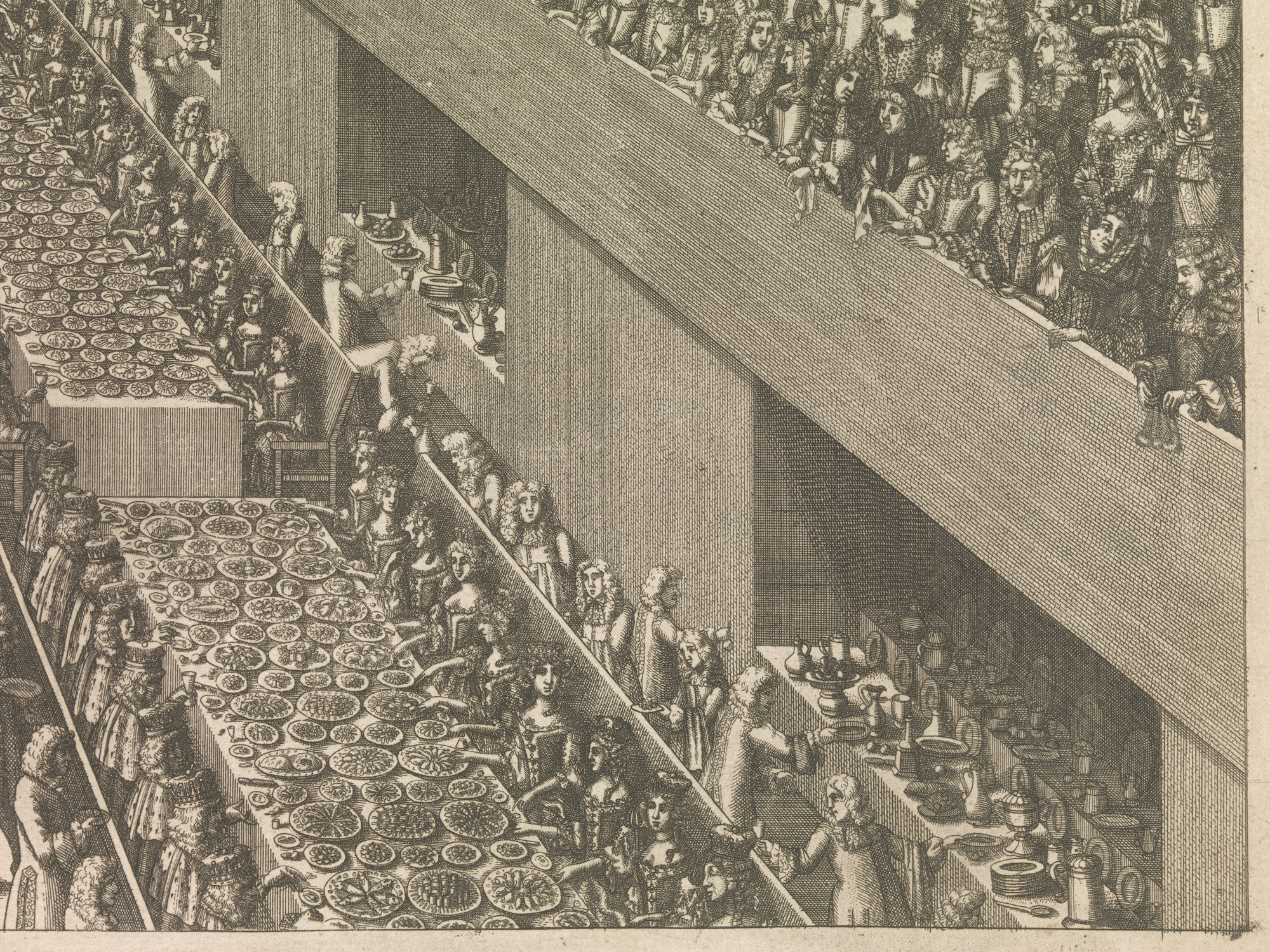
A detail of the illustration in Sandford's work, showing the peers' tables at the coronation banquet.

Following the coronation service, there was a return procession from the abbey to Westminster Hall, during which the cloth of gold canopy under which the King was walking was said to have ripped and the crown was said to have almost fallen off the King's head; these were taken as bad omens for the forthcoming reign.

The banquet, meticulously recorded by Sandford, consisted of 1,445 dishes, 175 of which were served to the King's table, at a total cost of £1,209 15s 7½d. The dishes included stags' tongues, roast udders, cold puffins and caviar. The high point of the ceremonial was the entry of the hereditary King's Champion, Sir Charles Dymock, to throw down a gauntlet three times, as the Garter Principal King of Arms read out a challenge to anyone disputing the right of the new king. The King and Queen left at 7 o'clock, ordering a postponement of the planned firework display until the next evening "by reason of the great fatigue of the day". Nevertheless, Sandford records that in London there were "Bonfires, Ringing of Bells, Royal Healths to Their MAJESTIES, and all other Expressions of an Universal Joy".

== After celebrations ==
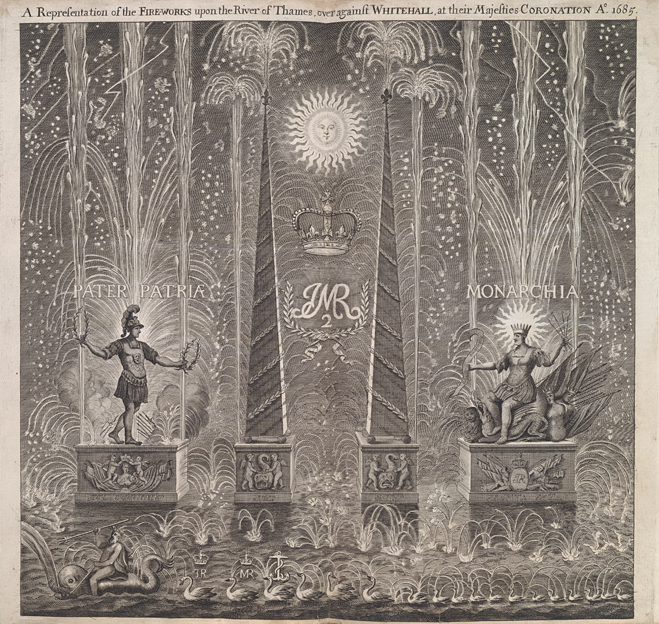
"A representation of the Fireworks upon the River of the Thames, over against Whitehall, at their Majesties Coronation April 1685"

The postponed firework display was devised by the King's Engineer, Major Martin Beckman, a Swedish artillery expert, who had also overseen the 1661 coronation fireworks during which he had been badly injured. At 9:30, the King and Queen appeared on the terrace of Whitehall Palace accompanied by a large number of courtiers. Fortunately, the tide was out, which saved any of the immense crowd from drowning. Three or four people were injured by stray pyrotechnics. No record of any music has survived, but it seems certain that the King's musicians contributed. The centre-piece of the display included two large pyramids and allegorical figures, surmounted by the royal cyphers, the imperial crown and over them all, a representation of the sun. An illuminated figure representing Neptune sailed past, followed by nineteen firework swans. The display continued for three-quarters of an hour.

The London Gazette reported local celebrations of feasting, bonfires and fireworks in Bristol, Manchester, Newcastle upon Tyne, Norwich, Nottingham, Prescot, Saltash and Shrewsbury. Local reports record coronation events in many smaller communities, such as Lyme Regis where there was a procession of 300 virgins. Although these events were generally sponsored by civic and church authorities, there does seem to have been genuine popular support for the new King and Queen.

== Sources ==
=== Books ===
- Archer, Ian W (2019). "Chapter 13: Royal Entries, the City of London, and the Politics of Stuart Successions". In Kewes, Paulina; McRae, Andrew (eds.). Stuart Succession Literature: Moments and Transformations. Oxford University Press. ISBN 978-0198778172.
- Ashley, Maurice (1978). James II. London: J. M. Dent & Sons Ltd. ISBN 978-0460120210.
- Bryant, Arthur (1938). Samuel Pepys: Volume III, the Saviour of the Navy. Cambridge University Press. ISBN 978-1-107-62626-3.
- Gosling, Lucinda (2013). Royal Coronations. Oxford: Shire Publications Ltd. ISBN 978-0-74781-220-3.
- Harris, Tim (2007). Revolution : the great crisis of the British monarchy, 1685-1720ؼ. London: Penguin Books. ISBN 978-0141016528.
- Jones, William (1883). Crowns & Coronations: A History of Regalia. London: Chato and Windus.
- Range, Matthias (2012). Music and Ceremonial at British Coronations: From James I to Elizabeth II. Cambridge University Press. pp. 256–257. ISBN 978-1-107-02344-4.
- Smee, Harry; Macrory, Henry (2020). Gunpowder & Glory: The Explosive Life of Frank Brock OBE. Oxford: Casemate Publishers. ISBN 978-1612008448.
- Starkey, David; Greening, Katie (2013). Music & Monarchy. London: BBC Books. ISBN 978-1849905862.
- Strong, Sir Roy (2005). Coronation: A History of Kingship and the British Monarchy. London: HarperCollins. ISBN 978-0-00-716054-9.
- Zimmerman, Franklin B. (1967). Henry Purcell, 1659-1695: His Life and Times. New York: St Martin's Press.

=== Articles ===
- Abbott, Sarah (21 April 2023). "The coronation of James II". nationalarchives.gov.uk. The National Archives.
- Gibson, William (2021). "Music at the British Court, 1685-1715". Mélanges de l'École française de Rome: Italie et Méditerranée modernes et contemporaines (133–2). doi:10.4000/mefrim.11045.
