= Queen Philippa =

Queen Philippa may refer to:

- Philippa of Hainault (1310–1369), queen consort of England
- Philippa of Lancaster (1360–1415), queen consort of Portugal
- Philippa of England (1394–1430), queen consort of Denmark, Sweden, and Norway
