= Forcer =

Forcer can mean:

- the active, typically the moving, part of a linear motor
- one of two people known as Francis Forcer
