= Mary de Bohun =

English noblewoman (c. 1369–1394)

- Countess of Northampton; Countess of Derby (by courtesy)
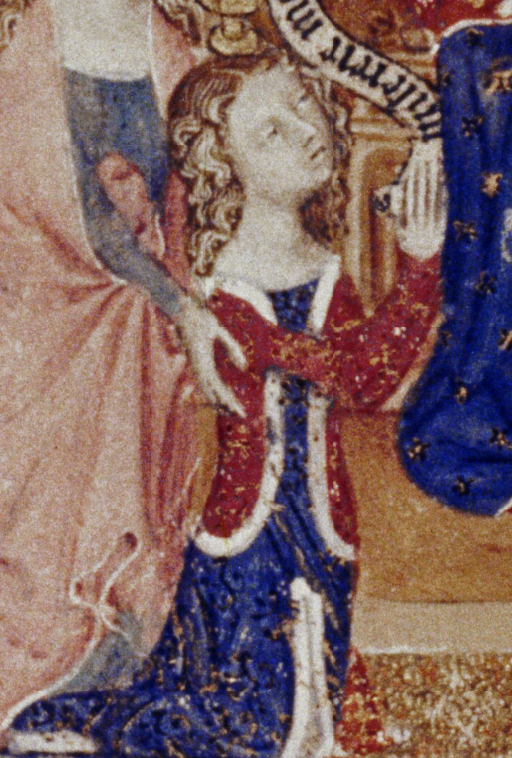
- Mary as a child in the Psalter of Mary de Bohun
- Born: c. 1369/70
- Died: 4 June 1394 (aged c. 24/25); Peterborough Castle, Kingdom of England
- Burial: 6 July 1394; The Collegiate Church of the Annunciation of Our Lady of the Newarke, Leicester
- Spouse: Henry Bolingbroke (m. 1381)
- Issue: Henry V, King of England; Thomas, Duke of Clarence; John, Duke of Bedford; Humphrey, Duke of Gloucester; Blanche, Countess Palatine; Philippa, Queen of Denmark, Norway and Sweden
- Father: Humphrey de Bohun, 7th Earl of Hereford
- Mother: Joan FitzAlan

Mary de Bohun (c. 1369/70 (Note: "Mary (born in 1369-70) was naturally a matter of considerable interest to Buckingham. As long as she remained single, the entire Bohun inheritance would fall to him.) – 4 June 1394) was the first wife of Henry Bolingbroke, Earl of Northampton, who became King Henry IV. As she died before her husband came to the throne, Mary was never queen. She and Henry had six children together, including the future Henry V.

== Early life ==
Mary was a daughter of Humphrey de Bohun, 7th Earl of Hereford and Joan FitzAlan, a daughter of Richard FitzAlan, 10th Earl of Arundel, and Eleanor of Lancaster.

Mary and her elder sister, Eleanor de Bohun, were the heiresses of their father's substantial possessions. Eleanor became the wife of Thomas of Woodstock, 1st Duke of Gloucester, the youngest child of Edward III. In an effort to keep the entire inheritance for himself and his wife, Thomas of Woodstock pressured the child Mary into becoming a nun. In a plot with John of Gaunt, Mary's aunt took her from Thomas' castle at Pleshey in Essex back to Arundel, whereupon she was married to Henry Bolingbroke, the future Henry IV of England.

== Marriage and children ==
Mary married Henry—then known as Bolingbroke—on 5 February 1381. She gave birth to her first child, the future Henry V, on 16 September 1386 at Monmouth Castle in Wales, one of her husband's possessions. Her second child, Thomas, was born probably at London shortly before 25 November 1387.

Her children were: (Note: According to some sources, in 1382, she had a son who died shortly after birth. This is incorrect, as it is based on a misreading of a contemporary account book, by J. H. Wylie, in his biography of Henry IV (published in the 19th century). Wylie missed a line which made clear that the boy in question was Mary's nephew, Humphrey, 2nd Earl of Buckingham. There is no evidence that there was any child born to Mary at this time (when she was only about 14).)

- Henry V, King of England (1386–1422)
- Thomas of Lancaster, Duke of Clarence (1387–1421)
- John of Lancaster, Duke of Bedford (1389–1435)
- Humphrey of Lancaster, Duke of Gloucester (1390–1447)
- Blanche of England (1392–1409) married in 1402 Louis III, Elector Palatine
- Philippa of England (1394–1430) married in 1406 Eric of Pomerania, King of Denmark, Norway and Sweden

== Death ==
Mary de Bohun died at Peterborough Castle, giving birth to her daughter Philippa. She was buried in the collegiate Church of the Annunciation of Our Lady of the Newarke, Leicester, on 6 July 1394.

== Ancestry ==
Ancestors of Mary de Bohun

8. Humphrey de Bohun, 4th Earl of Hereford
4. William de Bohun, 1st Earl of Northampton
9. Elizabeth of Rhuddlan
2. Humphrey de Bohun, 7th Earl of Hereford
10. Bartholomew Badlesmere, 1st Baron Badlesmere
5. Elizabeth Badlesmere
11. Margaret de Clare
1. Mary de Bohun
12. Edmund FitzAlan, 9th Earl of Arundel
6. Richard FitzAlan, 10th Earl of Arundel
13. Alice de Warenne
3. Joan FitzAlan
14. Henry, 3rd Earl of Lancaster
7. Eleanor of Lancaster
15. Maud Chaworth

== Sources ==
- Allmand, Christopher (1992). Henry V. The University of California Press.
- Archer, Rowena E. (1995). "Parliamentary Restoration: John Mowbray and the Dukedom of Norfolk in 1425". In Archer, Rowena E.; Walker, Simon (eds.). Rulers and Ruled in Late Medieval England: Essays Presented to Gerald Harriss. The Hambledon Press. pp. 99–116.
- Brown, Alfred Lawson; Summerson, H. (2010). "Henry IV [known as Henry Bolingbroke]". Oxford Dictionary of National Biography (online ed.). Oxford University Press. doi:10.1093/ref:odnb/12951. (Subscription, Wikipedia Library access or UK public library membership required.)
- Given-Wilson, Chris (2016). Henry IV. Yale University Press.
- Goodman, Anthony (2013). John of Gaunt: The Exercise of Princely Power in Fourteenth-Century Europe. Routledge.
- Knighton, Henry (1995). Martin, G.H. (ed.). Knighton's Chronicle, 1337-1396. Clarendon Press.
- Luxford, Julian M. (2008). "The Collegiate Church as Mausoleum". In Burgess, Clive; Heale, Martin (eds.). The Late Medieval English College and Its Context. York Medieval Press.
- Mortimer, Ian (2007). The Fears of Henry IV. Random.
- Panton, James (2011). Historical Dictionary of the British Monarchy. Scarecrow Press.
- Richardson, Douglas (2011). Plantagenet Ancestry: A Study In Colonial And Medieval Families. Genealogical Publishing Company.
- Staley, Lynn (2006). Languages of Power in the Age of Richard II. The Pennsylvania State University Press.
- Ward, Jennifer C., ed. (1995). Women of the English Nobility and Gentry, 1066–1500. Manchester University Press.
- Ward, Jennifer (2006). Women in England in the Middle Ages. Hambledon Continuum.
