= Francis Forcer =

Francis Forcer may refer to:

- Francis Forcer the Elder (c. 1650–c. 1705), English composer
- Francis Forcer the Younger (c. 1675–1743), master of Sadler's Well
