= Francis Sandford (herald) =

Anglo-Irish herald and genealogist

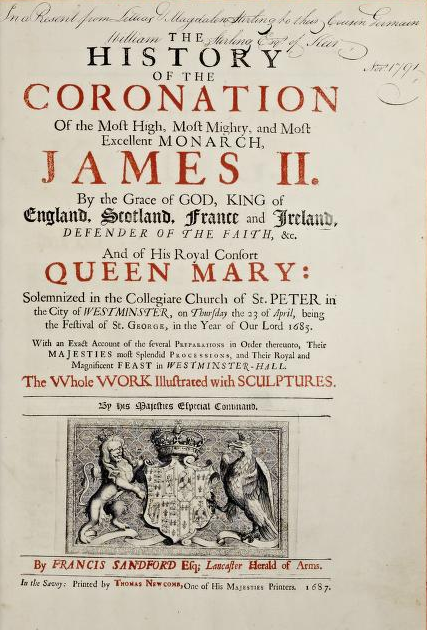
Title page of Sandford's The History of the Coronation of James II, 1687

Francis Sandford (1630 – 17 January 1694) was an Anglo-Irish herald and genealogist.

== Life ==
He was born at Carnew Castle, County Wicklow, Ireland, the third son of Francis Sandford of Sandford, Shropshire, England and his wife, Elizabeth, daughter of Chalcot Chambre of Williamscot, Oxfordshire, England. During the Irish Rebellion of 1641 Sandford escaped to Sandford in England, although afterwards he graduated BA at Trinity College, Dublin.

Sandford was appointed Rouge Dragon Pursuivant in the College of Arms on 6 June 1661. In 1666, when attending King Charles II at Oxford, he studied in the Bodleian Library, and he was appointed Lancaster Herald on 16 November 1676.

With Gregory King, Sandford laboured two years to write a history of the coronation of James II and VII and Mary. This lavish work included twenty seven engravings of the great feasts, processions and fireworks. However shortly afterwards James's deposition took place during the Glorious Revolution so the authors barely covered their expenses, despite James's gift of £300. Ifan K. Fletcher in The Literature of Splendid Occasions in English History called this book the most important descriptive book of the late seventeenth century: "James's exalted notions of his kingly office caused him to go minutely into the records of the past. He appointed a Commission for the right ordering of the ceremony in all its details and to draw up a kind of code of precedents to serve for future coronations. Sandford's book was the record upon which all coronations were to be based".

Sandford refused to attend the new monarchs William and Mary. Being conscientiously attached to James II, he obtained leave in 1689 to resign his office of Lancaster Herald to Gregory King, Rouge Dragon pursuivant, who paid him £220 for his office. He then retired to Bloomsbury or its vicinity. He died on 17 January 1694, "advanced in years, neglected, and poor", in the prison of Newgate, where he had been confined for debt, and was buried in St. Bride's upper churchyard. By his wife Margaret, daughter of William Jokes of Bottington, Montgomeryshire, and widow of William Kerry, he had several children.

== Works ==
- A Genealogical History of the Kings of Portugal (1662) (in part a translation from the French of Scevole and Louis de Saincte Marthe of 1623).
- The Order of Ceremonies used for, and at, the Solemn Interment of the Most High, Mighty and Most Noble Prince George Duke of Albemarle (1670).
- A Genealogical History of the Kings of England and Monarchs of Great Britain … from the Conquest, anno 1066, to the year 1677 (1677; reissued 1683; 2nd edn with continuations by Samuel Stebbing, 1707).
- The History of the Coronation of … James II … and of his Royal Consort, Queen Mary (1687).
