= Crown of Princess Blanche =

Oldest surviving crown to have been in England

Palatine Crown
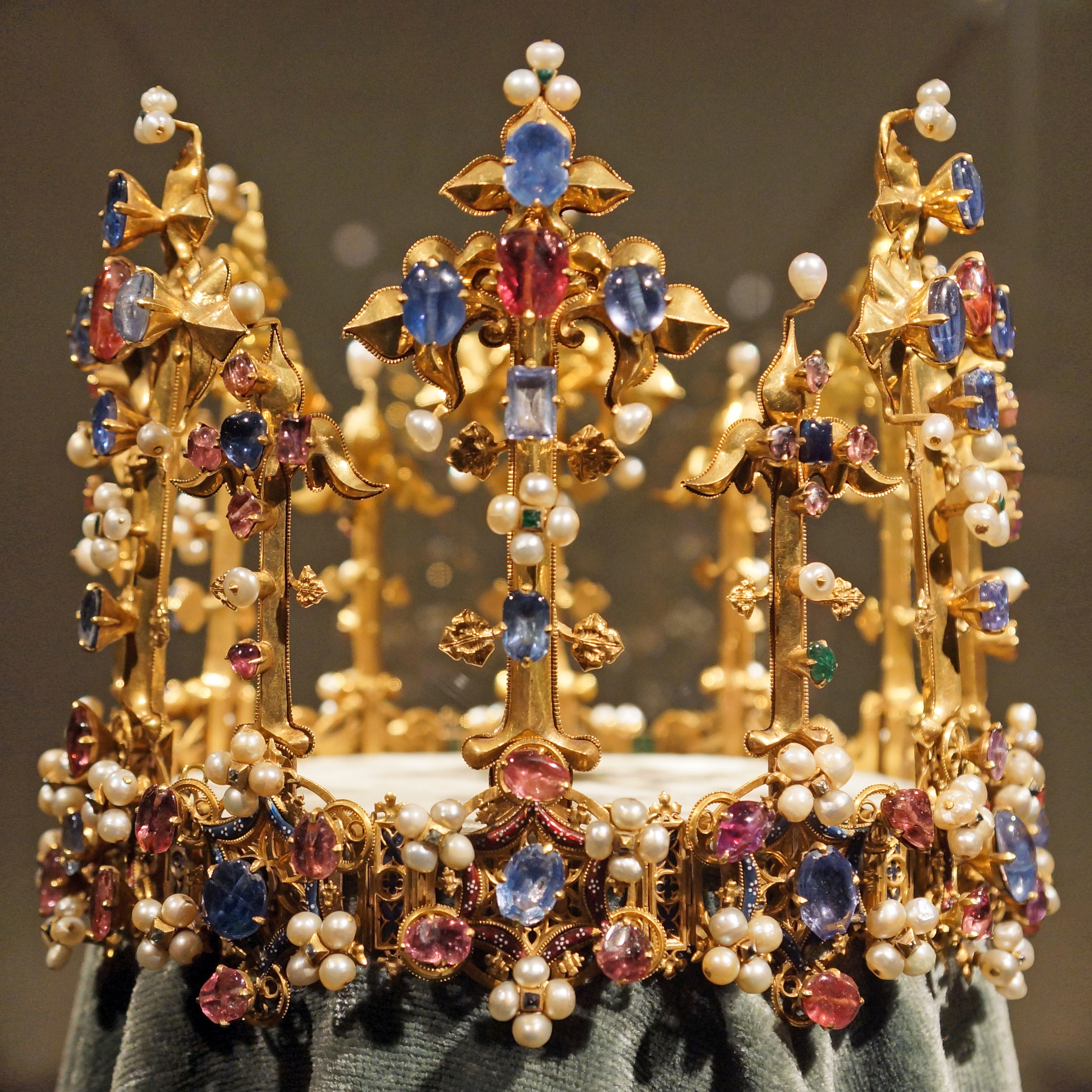
- The Crown of Princess Blanche

Details
- Country: Great Britain; Germany
- Made: 1370-80
- Owner: House of Wittelsbach
- Arches: None
- Material: Gold
- Cap: None
- Notable stones: Diamonds, pearls, sapphires, rubies, emeralds
- Other elements: Enamel

The Crown of Princess Blanche, also called the Palatine Crown or Bohemian Crown, is the oldest surviving royal crown known to have been in England, and probably dates to 1370–80.

It is made of gold with diamonds, balas rubies, emeralds, sapphires, enamel and pearls. Its height and diameter are both 18 centimetres (7.1 in). The crown has been a property of the House of Wittelsbach since 1402, when it came with Princess Blanche of England, daughter of King Henry IV of England, on her marriage to Louis III, Elector Palatine.

After the junior Bavarian branch of the house became extinct in the male line in 1777, the senior Palatine branch replaced the former as the country's rulers. Today, the crown is displayed in the treasury of the Munich Residenz, where it has been kept since 1782. It has been described as "one of the finest achievements of the Gothic goldsmith".

== Description ==
The crown is made up of 12 hexagonal rosettes on the base each supporting a gold stem topped by a lily. The stems and lilies alternate in size and height. They are heavily jewelled versions of the fleur de lys (lily flower) that was popular for medieval crowns. In the middle of the hexagons, which have enamelled white flowers overlaid onto a translucent blue or red background, is a pale blue sapphire, 11 of which are oval and 1 is hexagonal. Each point is decorated with alternating rubies and clusters of four pearls that have a small diamond at the centre. In addition to diamonds, pearls, and sapphires, the lilies are also decorated with emeralds.

Some of the original pearls may have been replaced when the crown was restored in 1925. The lily stems are detachable, and it is possible to fold the crown's base so that it can be transported more easily. Each rosette is numbered 1–12 to make sure the lilies are re-attached correctly. The crown is 18 centimetres (7.1 in) in both height and diameter.

== History ==
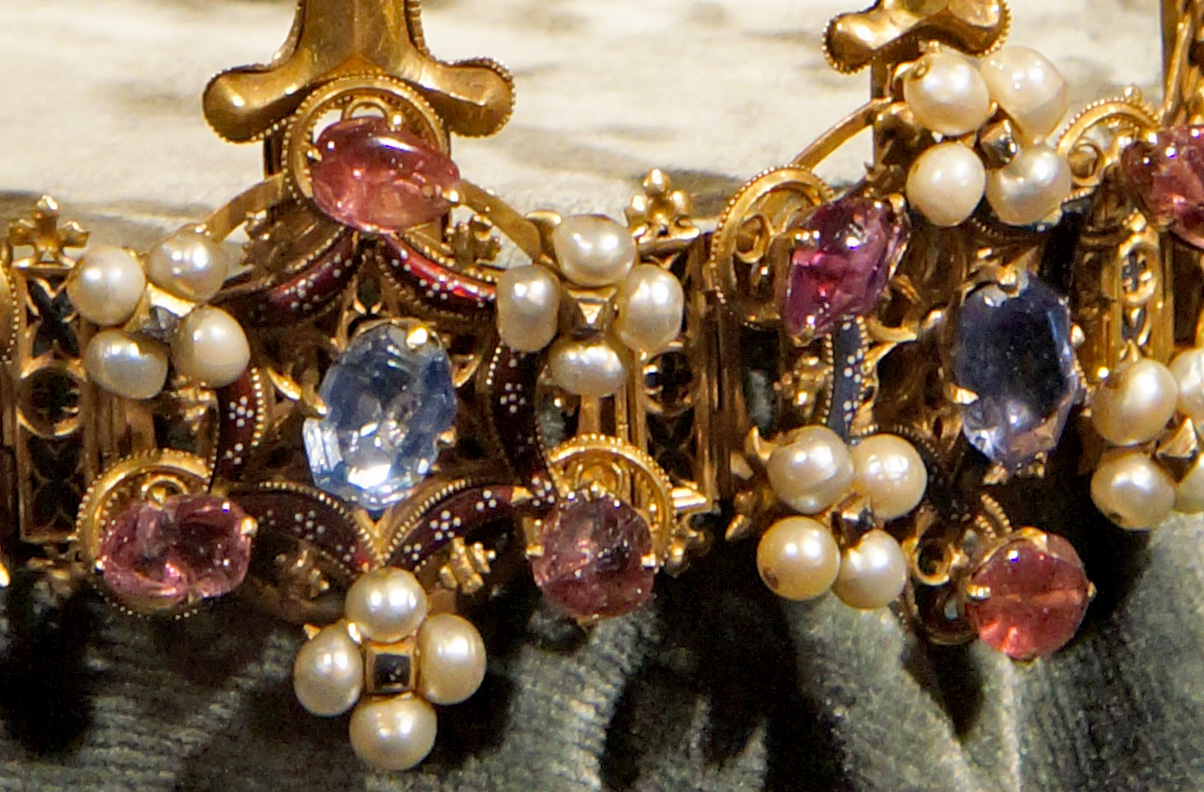
Detail of two hexagons mounted on the base with alternating arrangements of jewels and pearls

The nuptial crown is first documented in the inventory of King Richard II of England as having 12 fleurons, but a rosette was missing. At the time, it was decorated with 91 pearls, 63 balas rubies, 47 sapphires, 33 diamonds, and 5 emeralds. An additional 7 pearls and 1 emerald had been taken off the fleurons. The crown weighed 5 marks 7 oz, or just under 1 kilogram, and was valued at £246 13s 4d.

It was recorded again in a 1399 list of royal jewels being moved across London which had been owned by the deposed Richard II and others. Therefore, the crown had most likely belonged to Queen Anne of Bohemia, the wife of Richard II, whom she married in 1382. It may have been produced in Bohemia, but elements such as beading on the stems suggest Paris, though the maker might have been a French or French-trained goldsmith working in Prague. Venice has also been suggested as the crown's place of origin.

The crown came to the Palatine line of the House of Wittelsbach as dowry of Blanche of England, daughter of King Henry IV of England. After his accession to the English throne, Henry wanted to make important alliances in order to maintain and legitimize his rule. One ally whose support he hoped to gain was the Wittelsbach King Rupert of Germany, who also took the German throne after the deposition of King Wenceslaus. A marriage between Rupert's eldest surviving son, Louis, and Henry IV's eldest daughter, Blanche, was soon arranged.

On 7 March 1401, the marriage contract was signed in London, and the bride's dowry was fixed at 40,000 nobles. In 1402, prior to the wedding of Blanche and Louis III, it was restored by a London goldsmith, who added a twelfth rosette and replaced the missing emerald and pearls on the fleurons. The new rosette contained 12 pearls, 3 diamonds, 3 balas rubies, and 1 sapphire. In total, 1 6/8 ounces (50 g) of gold were added to the crown. Blanche wore the crown at her wedding, which took place on 6 July 1402 at Cologne Cathedral in Germany. In 1421, it was pawned to Maulbronn Monastery, and by that time several gems and pearls had been taken out.

In 1988, the crown featured in the Age of Chivalry exhibition at the Royal Academy of Arts in London – the first time it had returned to England since 1401.

== Bibliography ==
- Cherry, John (1987). Alexander, Jonathan; Binski, Paul (eds.). Age of Chivalry: Art in Plantagenet England, 1200–1400. Royal Academy of Arts/Weidenfeld & Nicolson. ISBN 978-0-297-79182-9.
- Cherry, John (2011). Medieval Goldsmiths (2 ed.). British Museum Press. ISBN 978-0-7141-2823-8.
- Gray, Amanda (1989). "A Fourteenth Century Crown". Journal of Gemmology. 21 (7): 431–432. doi:10.15506/JoG.1989.21.7.431. ISSN 0022-1252.
- Harlow, George E. (1998). The Nature of Diamonds. Cambridge University Press. ISBN 978-0-521-62935-5.
- Stratford, Jenny (2012). Richard II and the English Royal Treasure. Boydell Press. ISBN 978-1-84383-378-9.
