= Liber Regalis =

- Westminster Abbey Library, MS 38
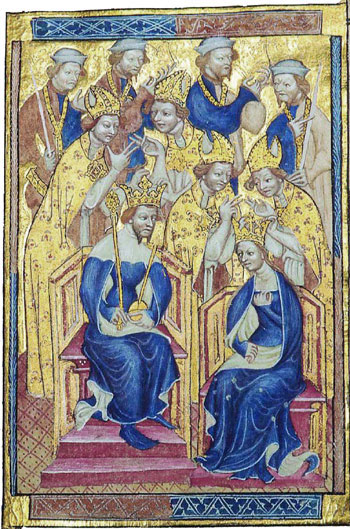
- Coronations of likely Richard II and Anne of Bohemia in the Liber Regalis
- Type: Codex
- Date: 14th century (1308 or 1382)
- Language: Latin
- Material: Vellum
- Size: 34 folios
- Contents: Coronation and funeral services

The Liber Regalis (Latin for "Royal Book") is an English medieval illuminated manuscript which was, most likely, compiled in 1382 to provide details for the coronation of Richard II's wife, England's new queen, Anne of Bohemia. Other sources suggest that it may have been compiled in 1308 for the coronation of Edward II. The Liber Regalis contains the ordo (order) for the following events: the coronation of a king, a king and queen and a queen alone, and details regarding the funeral of a king; each liturgy opens with a full-page illustration depicting the event.

The manuscript provided the order of service for all subsequent coronations up to, and including, that of Elizabeth I. For the coronation of James I and Anne the liturgy was translated into English. Nevertheless, with occasional adaptations to suit the political and religious circumstances of the time, the Liber Regalis remained the basis for all later coronation liturgies. The manuscript belongs to Westminster Abbey (MS 38).

== Miniature copy ==
The National Museum of Toys and Miniatures has a miniature copy by Sans Robinson.
