= Francis Forcer the Younger =

Master of Sadler's Wells theatre

Francis Forcer the younger (c.1675–1743) (or born c.1677), was known after 1724 as master of Sadler's Wells, and he resided there until his death. He had been sent to Oxford, entered Gray's Inn on 8 July 1696, and was called to the bar in 1703. Notwithstanding his culture, Forcer's reign at Sadler's Wells was marked by the introduction of nothing more intellectual than rope-dancing and tumbling. In 1735 a license for singing, dancing, pantomime, &c., and the sale of liquors was refused him by the authorities, who, however, promised at the same time not to interfere. It was not until after Forcer's death, when John Warren was occupier in 1744, that the grand jury of Middlesex thought it necessary to protest against the demoralizing influence of this and similar places of amusement. Forcer the younger was tall, athletic, and handsome. Garbott relates that he improved the place, and adds:

Miles in his way obliging was, we know,
Yet F . . . . r's language doth the softer flow;
Behaviour far genteeler of the two.
By birth a gentleman and breeding too,
Oxford, for liberal arts that is so fam*d,
(Inferior all, none equal can be nam'd)
His Alma Mater was, it is well known.
And Gray's Inn learned gave to him the gown.
Call'd was he from thence imto the bar, &c.

— a profession soon abandoned for the lucrative position 'behind the barr' at Sadler's Wells, where Stephen Monteage, Woollaston, and other habitués were wont to 'tarry.' Forcer was found to be 'very ill of the new distemper' on 5 April 1743; on the 9th he died. By his will he desired that his lease of Sadler's Wells should be sold; other property was left to his widow, Catherine, for life, and the bulk of his property to Frances (Mrs. Savage), his daughter by the former marriage.
