= Philippa of England =

Queen of Denmark, Norway and Sweden from 1406 to 1430

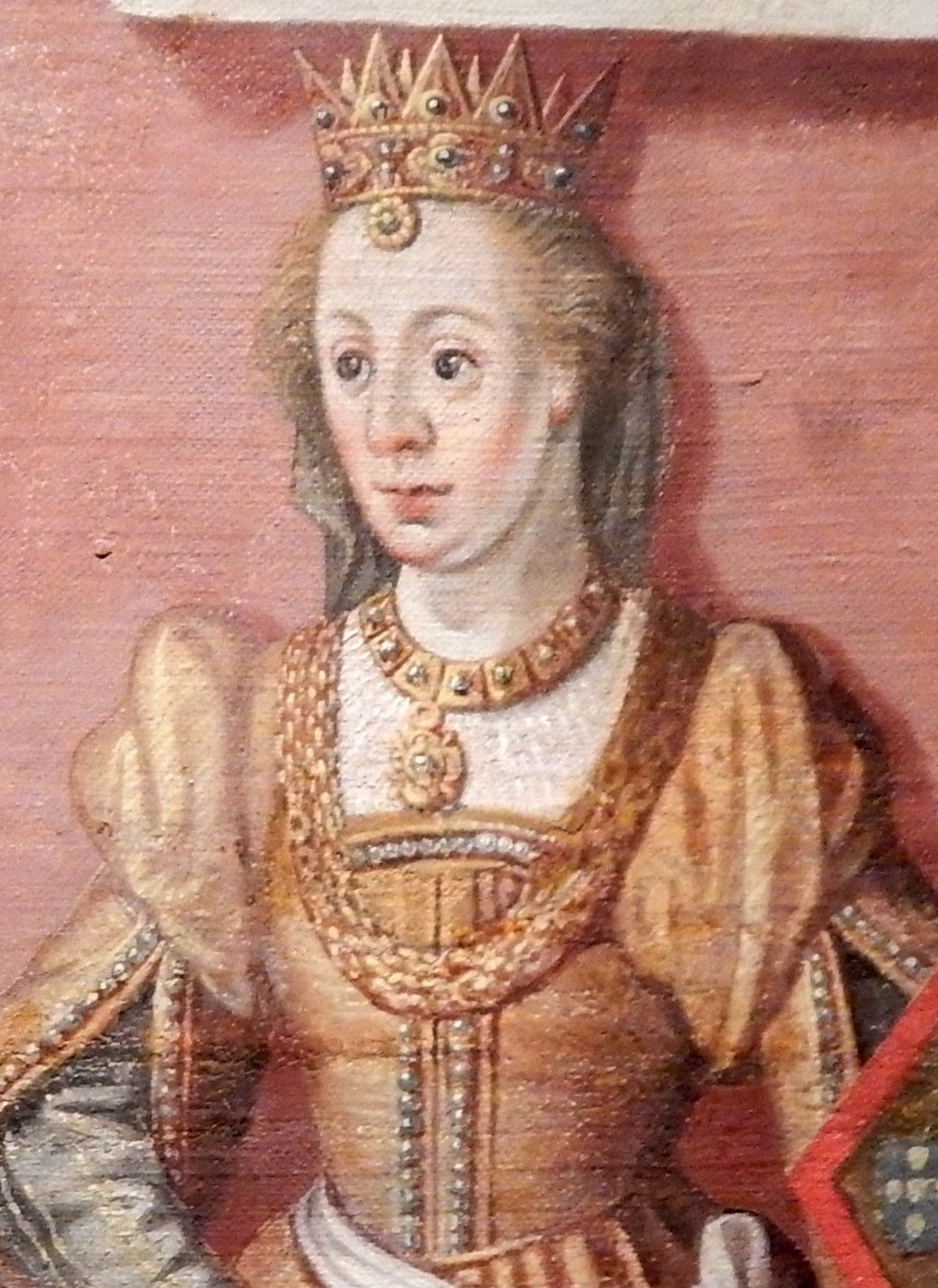
- Queen Philippa as portrayed in the 1590s by Cornelius Krommeny

Queen consort of Denmark, Sweden, and Norway
- Tenure: 26 October 1406 – 5 January 1430
- Coronation: 26 October 1406
- Born: mid-1394 Peterborough Castle, England
- Died: 5 January 1430 (aged 35); Vadstena Abbey, Sweden
- Burial: Cloister Church at Vadstena, Linköping, Sweden
- Spouse: Erik of Pomerania (m. 1406)
- House: Lancaster
- Father: Henry IV of England
- Mother: Mary de Bohun

Philippa of England (mid-1394 – 5 January 1430), also known as Philippa of Lancaster, was Queen of Denmark, Norway, and Sweden from 1406 to 1430 by marriage to King Eric of the Kalmar Union. She was the daughter of King Henry IV of England and his first wife Mary de Bohun and the younger sister of King Henry V of England. Queen Philippa participated significantly in state affairs during the reign of her spouse and served as regent of Denmark from 1423 to 1425.

== Biography ==
=== Early life ===
Philippa was born to Henry Bolingbroke and Mary de Bohun, at Peterborough Castle, Peterborough. Her father became king in 1399. She is mentioned a couple of times during her childhood: in 1403, she was present at her widowed father's wedding to Joan of Navarre, and the same year, she made a pilgrimage to Canterbury. She mainly lived at Berkhamsted Castle and Windsor Castle.

=== Marriage ===
In 1400 or 1401, King Henry suggested to Queen Margaret I of Denmark, Norway and Sweden that an alliance be formed between England and the Kalmar Union through a double wedding between Henry's daughter Philippa to the heir to the Nordic thrones, Erik of Pomerania, and Henry's son Henry to Eric's sister Catherine. Queen Margaret could not agree to the terms and the marriage between Henry and Catherine never occurred. In 1405, however, a Scandinavian embassy composed of two envoys from each of the three Nordic kingdoms arrived in England, and the marriage between 11 year old Philippa and 24 year old Eric was proclaimed. On 26 November 1405, Philippa was married to Eric by proxy in Westminster, with the Swedish nobleman Ture Bengtsson Bielke as the stand-in for the groom. On 8 December, she was formally proclaimed Queen of Denmark, Norway and Sweden in the presence of the Nordic ambassadors.

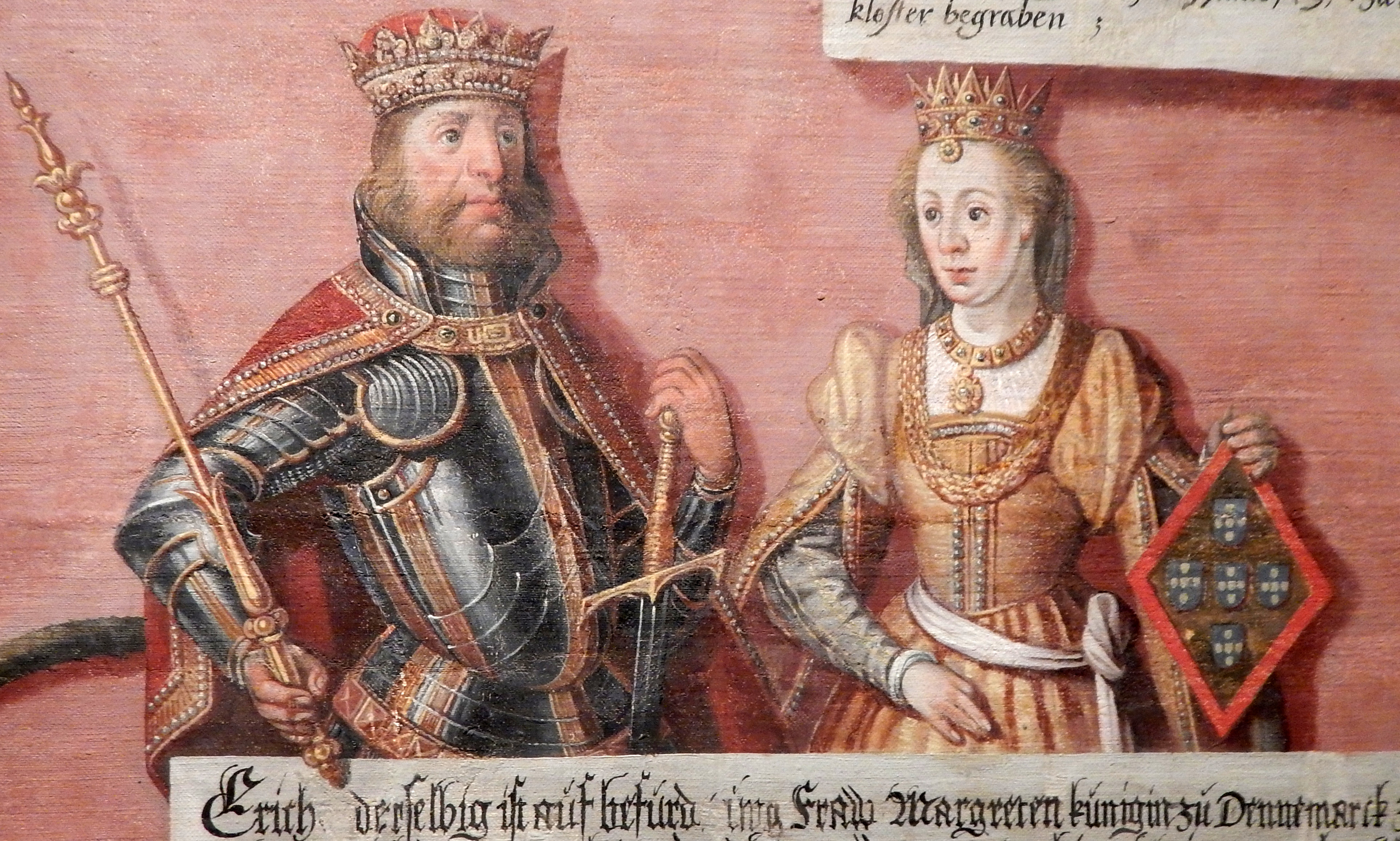
Eric of Pomerania and Philippa of England

Philippa left England from Lynn in August 1406 with an entourage of male and female English nobles and arrived in Helsingborg in September, where she was greeted by Eric and Queen Margaret. The wedding between Philippa and Erik of Pomerania took place on 26 October 1406 in Lund Cathedral. Philippa was the first documented princess in history to wear a white wedding dress during a royal wedding ceremony: she wore a tunic with a cloak in white silk bordered with grey squirrel and ermine. The wedding ceremony was followed by her coronation. The festivities lasted until November, during which several men were knighted and Philippa's dowry was officially received by the court chamberlain and clerics from the three kingdoms. Philippa was in turn granted dower lands in all three kingdoms: Närke and Örebro in Sweden, Fyn with Odense and Nasbyhoved in Denmark, and Romerike in Norway.

=== Queen and Regent ===
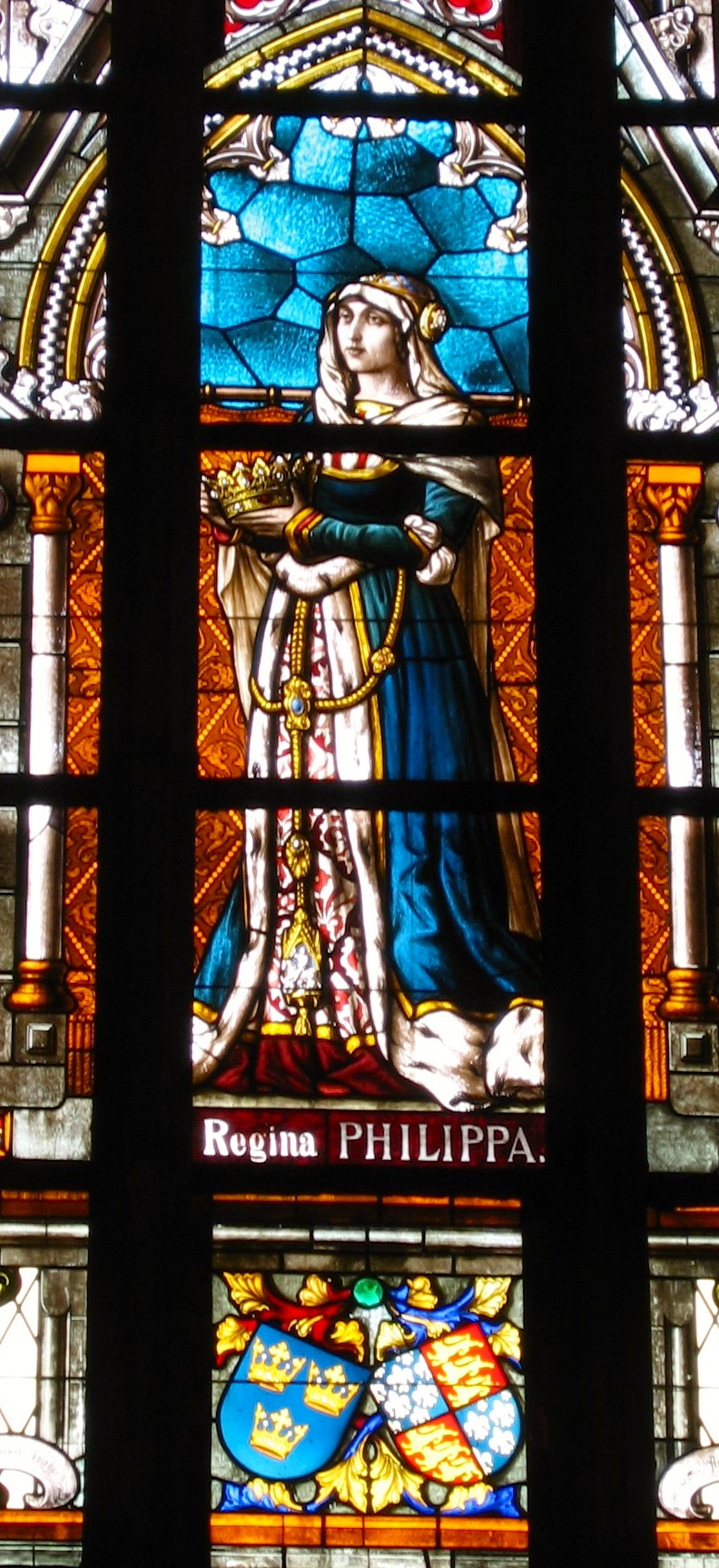
Philippa as imagined and painted by Swedish artist Reinhold Callmander in the 1890s on a window above her grave at Vadstena

Queen Philippa and King Eric lived in Kalmar Castle in Sweden with their court the first three years of their marriage. Philippa was given her own court, supervised by her chief lady in waiting, Lady Katarina Knutsdotter, a granddaughter of Saint Bridget of Sweden through Lady Märta Ulfsdotter, who had been the chief lady in waiting of Queen Margaret herself.

From 1409 onward, and particularly after the death of Queen Margaret in 1412, when Eric became King de facto, the royal couple mainly resided in Denmark. However, Philippa frequently returned to Sweden, and as she had lived there during her first years in Scandinavia, she was given a close relationship to Sweden, of the three Kingdoms, from the beginning.

Her particular interest in Sweden was Vadstena Abbey, which came to be a refuge for her and a base whenever she was in Sweden. Her English entourage had included Henry Fitzhugh, who had visited the Abbey with an English delegation for members in order to establish a Bridgettine monastery in England, and in 1415, four nuns, three female novices, one monk and one priest left the abbey under great celebrations for the foundation of what became the famed Syon Abbey. Philippa herself likely saw Vadstena for the first time in 1408, when she would have accompanied Eric there. During her second visit to Vadstena Abbey in January 1415, she followed the example of Queen Margaret and was accepted as a soror ab extra. In 1421, she made a donation to the Abbey in exchange for prayers for her, her spouse and her parents; in 1422, she delivered the relic of an arm from Canute the Holy to the Abbey, and in 1425, she donated the Choir of Saint Anne, whose inauguration she attended the following year. When Pope Martin V banned double monasteries in 1422, Queen Philippa and her spouse sent an embassy to Rome to ask for a retraction of the ban, and she also asked her brothers in England to intervene: the result was that an exception from the ban was made for the Bridgettine Order.

Queen Philippa was actively involved in state affairs. By the Pomeranian Act of Succession of 1416, Eric named his cousin Bogusław IX of Pomerania as heir to the three Kingdoms if his marriage to Philippa remained childless. When Eric left to participate in warfare in Femern in 1420, the Act was amended and Philippa was given an active role. The revised Act stated that upon the death of Eric, Queen Philippa should be appointed Regent of the realm until Bogusław could be instated as King; and should Bogusław inherit the three Kingdoms while still a minor, Philippa would serve as Regent during his minority.

In connection to this, Philippa's dower lands were also altered: instead of having dower lands in all three Kingdoms, she was given an immense dower land in Sweden consisting of Närke, Uppland, Stockholm, the fief of Köping, fief of Tälje, fief of Västerås, Arboga as well as Snävringe, essentially making her ruler of Central Sweden, with Själland as security.

Eric evidently had great trust in Philippa. Both ancient and modern authors give a favourable account of her rule. It is said that in certain matters she was more efficient than Eric. However, scholars have largely accepted this judgment of the Queen without going into detail. Her great dower lands in Sweden increased Philippa's interest in this Kingdom, and while Eric preferred to reside in Denmark, Philippa made such frequent and long visits in Sweden, where she acted as Eric's proxy while present, that she was the de facto Regent of Sweden for the most part of the 1420s, though not formally made such.

In March 1422, she formally summoned and presided over a Council of the Estates in Vadstena, where she mediated in a dispute between noble factions. She was often given power of attorney by Eric to handle Swedish affairs, such as the taxes of Öland in August 1425.

During the pilgrimage of King Eric from 1423 until May 1425, Queen Philippa served as regent of the three kingdoms from Copenhagen. During which, in the autumn of 1424, she solved a dispute with the Hanseatic League by establishing a new convention concerning the validity of the coin system, which they had wished for. During her regency, she also summoned the Swedish Council of the Estates in Stockholm in the spring of 1425.

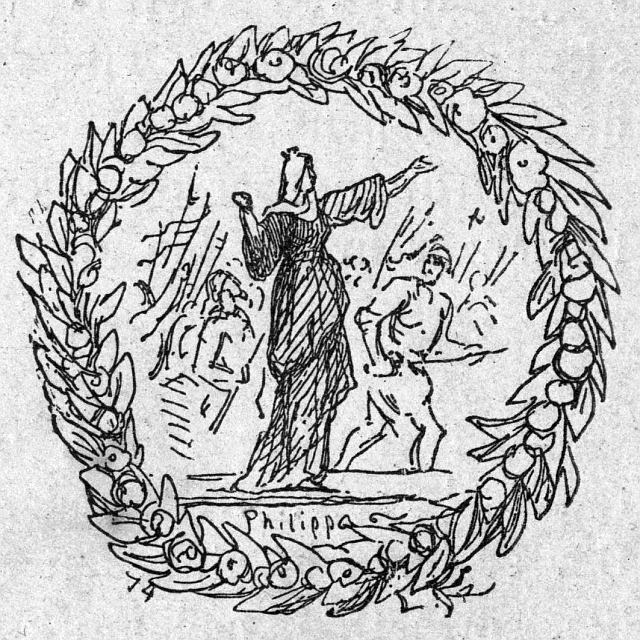
Queen Philippa commands the defenders of Copenhagen (1428). illustration in Hans Christian Andersen's Godfather's Picture Book

In the spring of 1426, Philippa was sent to Sweden by Eric where she summoned the Swedish council in Vadstena and managed to secure support and funds for the Dano-Hanseatic War (1426–35) despite the Swedish opposition to this war. In January 1427, when the war was going the wrong way for Eric, she summoned the Swedish council to Nyköping, where she again managed to secure Swedish support for Eric in his war. At this visit, she also acquired additional Swedish estates to support her future in Sweden, where she evidently planned to retire as a widow.

In March 1427 she returned to Denmark, where she stayed for three years during the war. In 1428, Philippa successfully organized the defense of the Danish capital against the attack of the Hanseatic League during the 1428 bombardment of Copenhagen. She was hailed as a heroine by the people of Copenhagen for rallying the citizens to fight the Hanseatic fleet in Copenhagen Harbor.

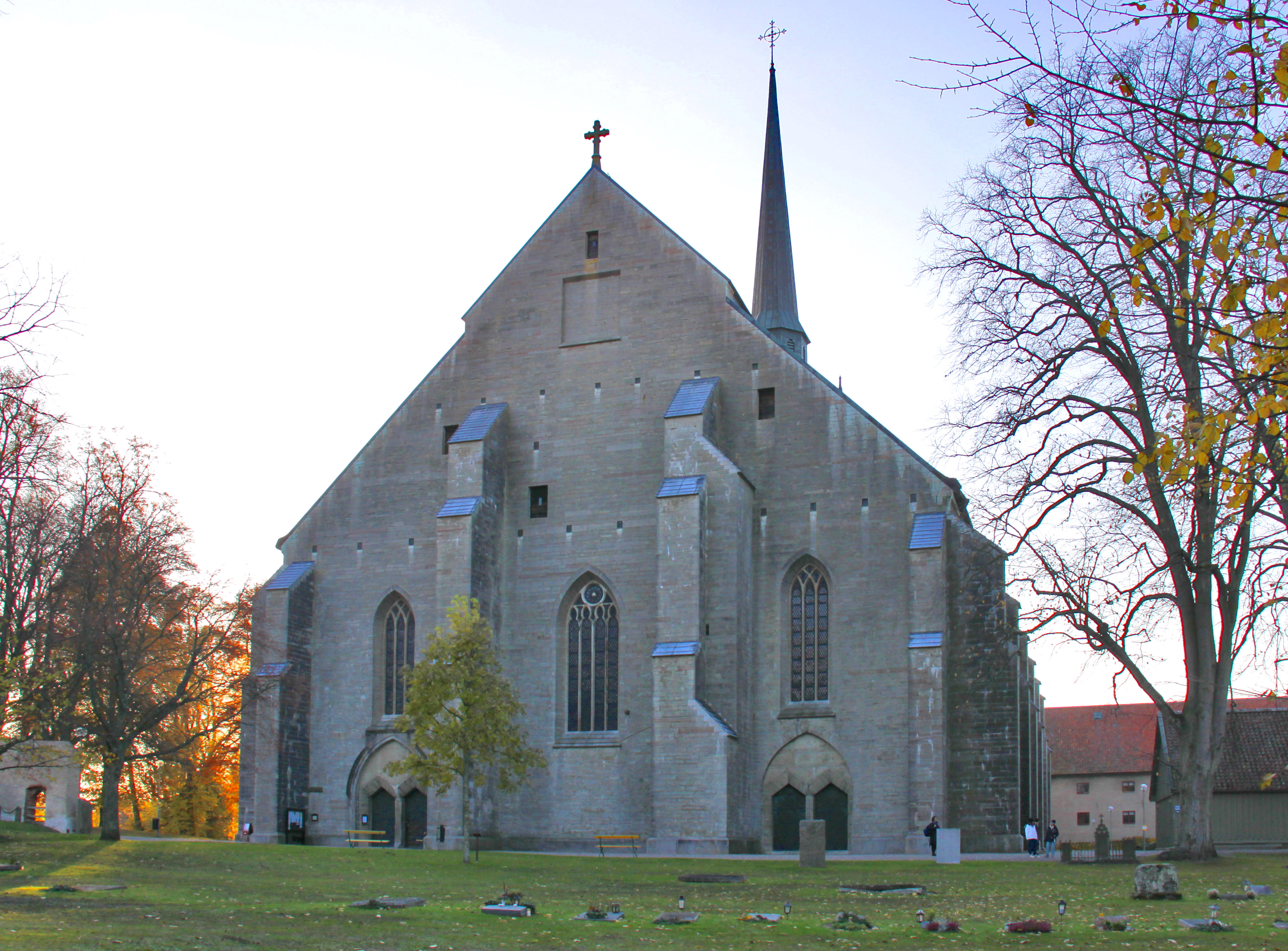
Cloister Church at Vadstena Abbey

In late 1429, Philippa left for Sweden, officially on a mission from Eric to secure support for his war in Sweden, where the war had been opposed from the start. In Sweden, she traveled to Vadstena Abbey as usual, where she was welcomed by a delegation of Swedish riksråd. Not long after her arrival, however, she fell ill. This was an attack of some kind of a recurring illness which had been noted to affect her at times for at least the previous five years.

The queen bore a stillborn boy and her health deteriorated after the stillbirth. She died on 5 January 1430 at the age of 35 and was buried in the Cloister Church at Vadstena, close to Linköping in Östergötland, Sweden. She made several donations to Vadstena Abbey in her will. After her death Eric formed a relationship with a former lady-in-waiting of Philippa's, Cecilia.

== Legacy ==
- Philippa is described as one of few royals of the Kalmar Union who was actually popular outside Denmark, and in Sweden, she was often praised as a positive contrast to Eric, who was generally unfavorably depicted.
- Her defence of Copenhagen in 1428 was later famously recounted by Hans Christian Andersen in Godfather's Picture Book (1868).
- She is portrayed by New Zealand actress Thomasin McKenzie in the movie The King.
- In the Danish language movie Margrete: Queen of the North she is played by child actress Diana Martinová.

== Gallery ==
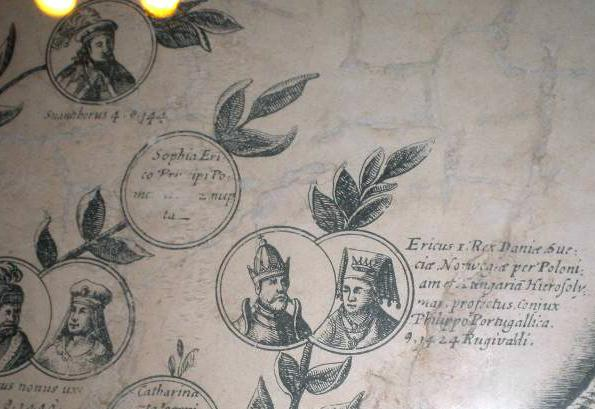
Philippa (genealogically misidentified) with King Eric on an old print displayed at Darlowo Castle

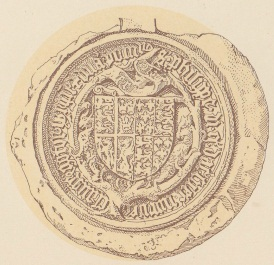
Seal of Queen Philippa

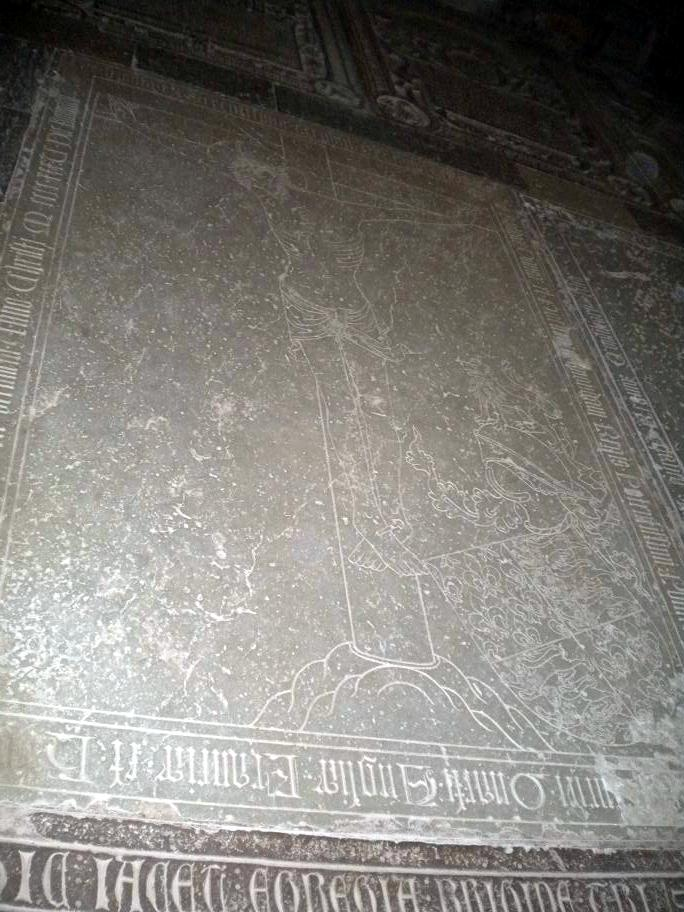
Philippa's grave at Vadstena Abbey

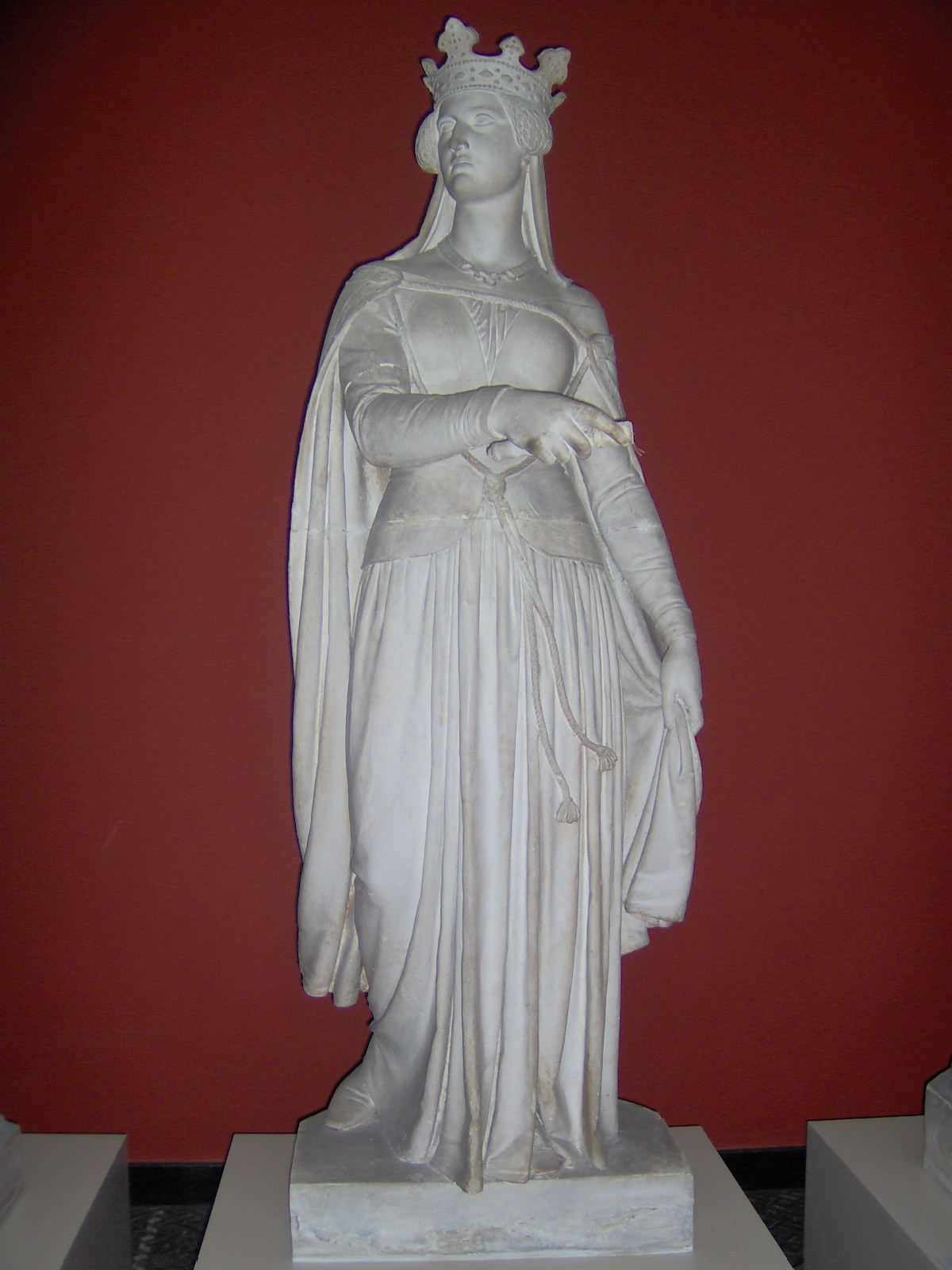
19th-century interpretation of Philippa of England, sculpted by H.W. Bissen

== Ancestry ==
Ancestors of Philippa of England

8. Edward III of England
4. John of Gaunt, 1st Duke of Lancaster
9. Philippa of Hainault
2. Henry IV of England
10. Henry of Grosmont, 1st Duke of Lancaster
5. Blanche of Lancaster
11. Isabel of Beaumont
1. Philippa of England
12. William de Bohun, 1st Earl of Northampton
6. Humphrey de Bohun, 7th Earl of Hereford
13. Elizabeth de Badlesmere
3. Mary de Bohun
14. Richard FitzAlan, 10th Earl of Arundel
7. Joan FitzAlan
15. Eleanor of Lancaster

== Other sources ==
- Lars-Olof Larsson (2006) Kalmarunionens tid Kalmarunionens tid : Från drottning Margareta till Kristian II (Bokförlaget Prisma) ISBN 978-91-518-3165-7 (Swedish)

== Related reading ==
- Anne J. Duggan (2008) Queens and queenship in medieval Europe (Boydell Press) ISBN 978-08-511-5881-5
- Philippa of England at Svenskt kvinnobiografiskt lexikon

Philippa of England House of Lancaster Born: 1394 Died: 7 January 1430
Royal titles
| Vacant Title last held by Helvig of Schleswig | Queen consort of Denmark; 1406–1430 | Vacant Title next held by Dorothea of Brandenburg |
| Vacant Title last held by Margaret I of Denmark | Queen consort of Norway; 1406–1430 | Vacant Title next held by Dorothea of Brandenburg |
| Vacant Title last held by Richardis of Schwerin | Queen consort of Sweden; 1406–1430 | Vacant Title next held by Dorothea of Brandenburg |
