= Francis Forcer the Elder =

English composer (c.1650–c.1705)

Francis Forcer the elder (c.1650–c.1705) was an English composer.

== Life ==
Forcer is mentioned by Hawkins as the writer of many songs, five of which may be found in Playford's Choyce Ayres and Dialogues, (bk. ii. 1679, one in the edition of 1681, and two in that of 1683). Some of his music is in the Fitzwilliam Collection, Cambridge, an overture and eight tunes are in the Christ Church Library, Oxford, and a set of instrumental trios, with a jig and gavotte for organ, among the British Museum manuscripts.

He was one of four stewards for the celebration of St. Cecilia's day of 1684. Towards the end of the seventeenth century Forcer became the lessee of Sadler's Wells music house, garden, and water at Clerkenwell, with one James Miles (about 1697) as his partner. To Miles was assigned the control of the good cheer, the building or "boarded house" becoming known as "Miles's Music House", while the waters were advertised as "Sadler's Wells". The musical entertainment at such places of resort at that period was said by Hawkins to be hardly deserving the name of concert, i.e., concerted music, for the instruments were limited to violins, hautboys, and trumpets playing in unison, and when a bass was introduced it was merely to support a simple ballad or dance-tune. "The musick plays, and 'tis such music as quickly will make me or you sick", comments an old writer upon the efforts of a rival establishment; and Ned Ward describes the combination of attractions at Sadler's Wells in the lines:

The organs and fiddles were scraping and humming,
The guests for more ale on the table were drumming.

Lady Squalb rose to sing, and "silenced the noise with her musical note", and a fierce fiddler in scarlet ran "up in alt with a hey diddle diddle, to show what a fool he could make of the fiddle". It appears that these primitive entertainments were announced "to begin at eleven, to hold until one".

Forcer obtained a license to marry Jane Taylor of Worplesdon, Surrey, on 30 July 1673. He was then described as "of St. Bartholomew, Exchange, London, gent., bachelor, about twenty-three". He died in 1704 or 1705, leaving (by a will dated 1704) to his son, Francis Forcer, various properties in Durham and in Fetter Lane. There is no mention of Sadler's Wells, and nor was Sadler's Wells among the property left by James Miles upon his death in 1724. By the latter's will his daughter Frances, wife of Francis Forcer the younger, became entitled to an annuity, and lands in Berkshire, Essex, &c. are settled upon Henry and John Miles Tompkins, the children of the said Mrs. Francis Forcer (d. 1726) by her first husband.
