= Peterborough Castle =

Castle in Peterborough, England

- Peterborough, Cambridgeshire, England

Site information
- Type: Motte and bailey
- Condition: Earthworks only survive

Location
- Shown within Cambridgeshire
- Coordinates: 52.5730°N 0.2396°W
- Grid reference: grid reference TL194987

Peterborough Castle, also known as Mount Thorold and Touthill, was a medieval motte and bailey castle in Peterborough, Cambridgeshire, England.

== Details ==
Peterborough Castle was built by Abbot Thorold of Peterborough, a Norman appointed to the post by William the Conqueror. A motte and bailey design was erected close to the cathedral, in what is now the Dean's garden. Thorold built the castle to protect himself against the monks in the cathedral, during the turbulent post-conquest period. The castle was destroyed by the 12th century abbot Martin de Bec.

Today only the motte survives of the castle and is now between ten and twelve metres high. The castle has scheduled monument status.

== See also ==
- Castles in Great Britain and Ireland
- List of castles in England

== Bibliography ==
- Armitage, Ella. (1912) The Early Norman Castles of the British Isles. London: John Murray.
