= Richard Fitzalan, 3rd Earl of Arundel =

14th-century English nobleman and military leader

- 3rd Earl of Arundel; 8th Earl of Surrey
- Arms of Richard Fitzalan
- Born: 1306; Sussex
- Died: 24 January 1376 (age 62/63); Arundel Castle, Arundel, West Sussex
- Buried: Lewes Priory, Lewes, West Sussex
- Family: FitzAlan
- Spouses: Isabel le Despenser (m. 1321; ann. 1344); Eleanor of Lancaster (m. 1345; died 1372)
- Issue Detail: Edmund Fitzalan; Richard Fitzalan, 4th Earl of Arundel; John Fitzalan, 1st Baron Arundel; Thomas Arundel; Joan Fitzalan; Alice Holland, Countess of Kent
- Father: Edmund Fitzalan, 2nd Earl of Arundel
- Mother: Alice de Warenne

Richard Fitzalan, 3rd Earl of Arundel, 8th Earl of Surrey (1306 – 24 January 1376), was an English nobleman and medieval military leader and distinguished admiral. Arundel was one of the wealthiest nobles, and most loyal noble retainer of the chivalric code that governed the reign of Edward III of England.

== Early life ==
Richard was born in 1306 in Sussex, England. Fitzalan was the eldest son of Edmund Fitzalan, 2nd Earl of Arundel, and his wife Alice de Warenne. His parents married after 30 December 1304, after his father had initially been fined for refusing to marry Alice in 1304; their betrothal had been arranged by Alice's grandfather the Earl of Surrey, his father's guardian. Arundel changed his mind after the Earl died, leaving Alice the heiress presumptive, and with her only brother married to a ten-year-old girl. His maternal grandparents were William de Warenne and Joan de Vere. William was the only son of John de Warenne, 6th Earl of Surrey (himself the son of Maud Marshal by her second marriage), and his wife Alice de Lusignan (died 1256), half-sister of Henry III of England.

== Civil career ==
Around 1321, Fitzalan's father allied with Edward II's favourites, Hugh le Despenser, 1st Earl of Winchester and his namesake son, and Richard was married to Isabel le Despenser, daughter of Hugh the Younger. Fortune turned against the Despenser party, and on 17 November 1326, Fitzalan's father was executed. He did not succeed to his father's estates or titles. However, political conditions had changed by 1330, and over the next few years, Richard was gradually able to reacquire the Earldom of Arundel as well as the great estates his father had held in Sussex and in the Welsh Marches.

Beyond this, in 1334 he was made Justiciar of North Wales (later his term in this office was made for life), in 1336 Constable of Portchester Castle (until 1338), and in 1339 High Sheriff of Caernarvonshire and Governor of Caernarfon Castle for life. He was one of the most trusted supporters of Edward the Black Prince in Wales.

== Naval and military service during the Hundred Years' War ==
Despite his high offices in Wales, in the following decades, Arundel spent much of his time fighting in Scotland (during the Second Wars of Scottish Independence) and France (during the Hundred Years' War). In 1337, Arundel was made joint commander of the English army in the north, and the next year he was made the sole commander. In September 1339 a French fleet appeared off Sluys, determined to make sail against Edward III's fleet. When eventually they put to sea on 2 October they were blown off course by a violent storm back to the Zet Zwijn roads. Edward met Parliament, and they ordered a new fleet to be granted provisions by the barons of the cinque ports, and commanded by the Admiral of the West, Lord Arundel. Seventy ships from the west met at Portsmouth on 26 March 1340 to be commanded by their new admiral. The earl, granted the commission on 20 February 1340, was joined by fleets from the north and cinque ports. That summer he joined the king on flagship cog Thomas, leaving port two days later on 22 June for Flanders. Arundel was a distinguished soldier, in July 1340 he fought at the Battle of Sluys, during which his heavily laden cog grappled with the Spanish fleet. Summoned by Parliament on 13 July, he bore witness to the victory. By December 1342 Arundel had relinquished his post as admiral.

But it appears he may have been at the siege of Tournai. After a short term as Warden of the Scottish Marches, he returned to the continent, where he fought in a number of campaigns, and was appointed joint lieutenant of Aquitaine in 1340. The successful conclusion of the Flanders campaign, in which Arundel saw little fighting, encouraged the setting up of the Knights of the Round Table—attended every Whitsun by 300 great knights. A former guardian of the Prince of Wales, Arundel was also a close friend of Edward III, and one of the four great earls—Derby, Salisbury, Warwick and himself. With Huntingdon and Sir Ralph Neville, he was a Keeper of the Tower and guardian to the prince with a garrison of 20 men-at-arms and 50 archers. A royal councillor, he was expected to raise taxes, which had caused such consternation on 20 July 1338. The king's wars were not always popular, but Arundel was a vital instrument of that policy. Despite the failure of the peace negotiations at Avignon in 1344, Edward was decided on protecting his Gascon subjects. In early 1345, Derby and Arundel sailed for Bordeaux as lieutenants of the duchy of Aquitaine, attempting to prevent Prince Jean's designs on the tenantry. In August 1346 Derby returned with an army of 2,000 men; while Arundel was responsible for naval preparations.

=== Admiral of the West ===
On 23 February 1345 Arundel was made Admiral of the Western Fleet, perhaps for a second time, to continue the policy of arresting merchant ships, but two years later was again superseded. Arundel was one of the three principal English commanders at the Battle of Crécy, his experience vital to the outcome of the battle with Suffolk and the bishop of Durham in the rearguard. Throughout he was entrusted by the king as guardian of the young Prince Edward. Arundel's division was on the right side of the battle lines, flanked to the right with archers, and stakes to the front.

He spent much of the following years on various military campaigns and diplomatic missions. The king himself and the entourage went to Winchelsea on 15 August 1350, set sail on the cog Thomas on the 28th, for the fleet to chase the Spaniard De la Cerda downwind, which they sighted the following day. The ships rammed before the party escaped unhurt on another vessel. Overcome by much larger Spanish ships, the English could not grapple. (Note: Nearly 400 knights in the accompanied the royal party.)

English ships in Battle of L'Espagnols sur mer
Ship	Master
Thomas	William Passelewe
	Robert Shipman, constable
Edward	William Piers
Jonette	Walter Langdale
Plenty	John Wille
Isabella	John Ram
Gabriel	John Rokke
Michael	John Maikyn
Welfare	John Stygey
Mariote
Jerusalem
Thomas Beauchamp
Mary
Godibiate
John
Edmund
Falcon
Buchett
Lawrence

In a campaign of 1375, at the end of his life, he destroyed the harbour of Roscoff. Only days after the death of Edward III, a Castilian fleet raided the south coast of England, and returned again in August. Arundel's fleet had put into Cherbourg for supplies, but no sooner had it departed than the port was blockaded; one squadron was left behind and captured. At the same time, galleys harassed the coast of Cornwall.

== Great wealth ==
In 1347, he succeeded to the Earldom of Surrey (or Warenne), which even further increased his great wealth. He did not, however, use the additional title until after the death of the Dowager Countess of Surrey in 1361. He made very large loans to King Edward III but even so, on his death left behind a great sum in hard cash.

== Marriages and children ==
He married twice.

Firstly on 9 February 1321 at Havering-atte-Bower, Middlesex, to Isabel le Despenser (born 1312, living 1356, and died by 1374/5). At that time, the future earl was about seven, and his bride eight years old. Later he repudiated this bride and was granted an annulment by Pope Clement VI on 4 December 1344 on the grounds that he had been underage and unwilling. By this marriage, Richard and Isabel had one son (when Richard was fifteen, and Isabel sixteen); Martyn John Lawrence claims that he had two sisters called Phillipa and Isabel, while a study also adds one more daughter to them named Laura/Lora, who had an illegitimate daughter by Fernando Afonso de Albuquerque.:

- Sir Edmund de Arundel, Knt., of Chedzoy, Martock, Sutton Montagu, and Thurlbear, Somerset; Chudleigh, Devon; Melbury Bubb, Dorset; Bignor, Trayford and Compton, Sussex (c. 1329 – 1381/2) was the heir to the earldom of Arundel until he was rendered illegitimate by the annulment of his parents' marriage.

Secondly on 5 April 1345 he married Eleanor of Lancaster, a young widow, the second-youngest daughter and sixth child of Henry, 3rd Earl of Lancaster and Maud Chaworth. By Papal dispensation he was allowed to marry his first wife's first cousin by their common grandmother Isabella de Beauchamp. (Note: This was necessary because his first wife and second wife were closely related.) Eleanor was the widow of John de Beaumont, 2nd Baron Beaumont. The king, Edward III, himself a kinsman of both wives, attended this second marriage. By now, the Earl of Arundel had rebuilt the family wealth and was apparently a major financier of the Crown, and financial sweeteners may have been used to reconcile both the Church and the Crown. (Note: Isabel's family was politically weak, compared to Eleanor's family. The marriage may have been a love marriage (there is some evidence that the widowed Eleanor became the earl's mistress on a pilgrimage c. 1343), or Richard may have been waiting to obtain a suitable high-born wife with royal connections.) By this second marriage 5 February 1345, Richard and Eleanor had 3 sons and 3 surviving daughters:

- Richard Fitzalan, 4th Earl of Arundel, who was his son and heir.
- John Fitzalan, 1st Baron Arundel, 1st Baron Maltravers, who was a Marshall of England, drowned in 1379. The current Duke of Norfolk descends from Lady Mary, Duchess of Norfolk, a daughter and co-heiress of Henry Fitzalan, 12th Earl of Arundel; being a descendant of John FitzAlan, 1st Baron Arundel.
- Thomas Arundel, who became Archbishop of Canterbury
- Joan Fitzalan (1347 – 7 April 1419) who married Humphrey de Bohun, 7th Earl of Hereford. They were the maternal grandparents of Henry V of England through their daughter Mary de Bohun.
- Alice FitzAlan (1350 – 17 March 1416), who married Thomas Holland, 2nd Earl of Kent, matrilineal brother of King Richard II. They were ancestors to queen consorts Anne Neville (wife of King Richard III), Elizabeth of York (wife of King Henry VII) and Katherine Parr (wife of Henry VII's son Henry VIII).

He also had an illegitimate daughter by an unknown mistress:

- Eleanor Fitzalan, married in or before 1348 as his first wife John de Bereford of Clapcot, Berkshire, Bickford, Stonythorpe, and Wishaw, Warwickshire, an illegitimate son of Edmund de Bereford, Knt. They had no issue.

Probable illegitimate offspring include:

- Ranulph FitzAlan, who married a lady named Juliana, last name unknown. Through them descended the Hungerfords, the St. Johns and the Villiers, including Barbara (formerly Palmer) Villiers, the first of many mistresses of King Charles II of England.

== Death and legacy ==
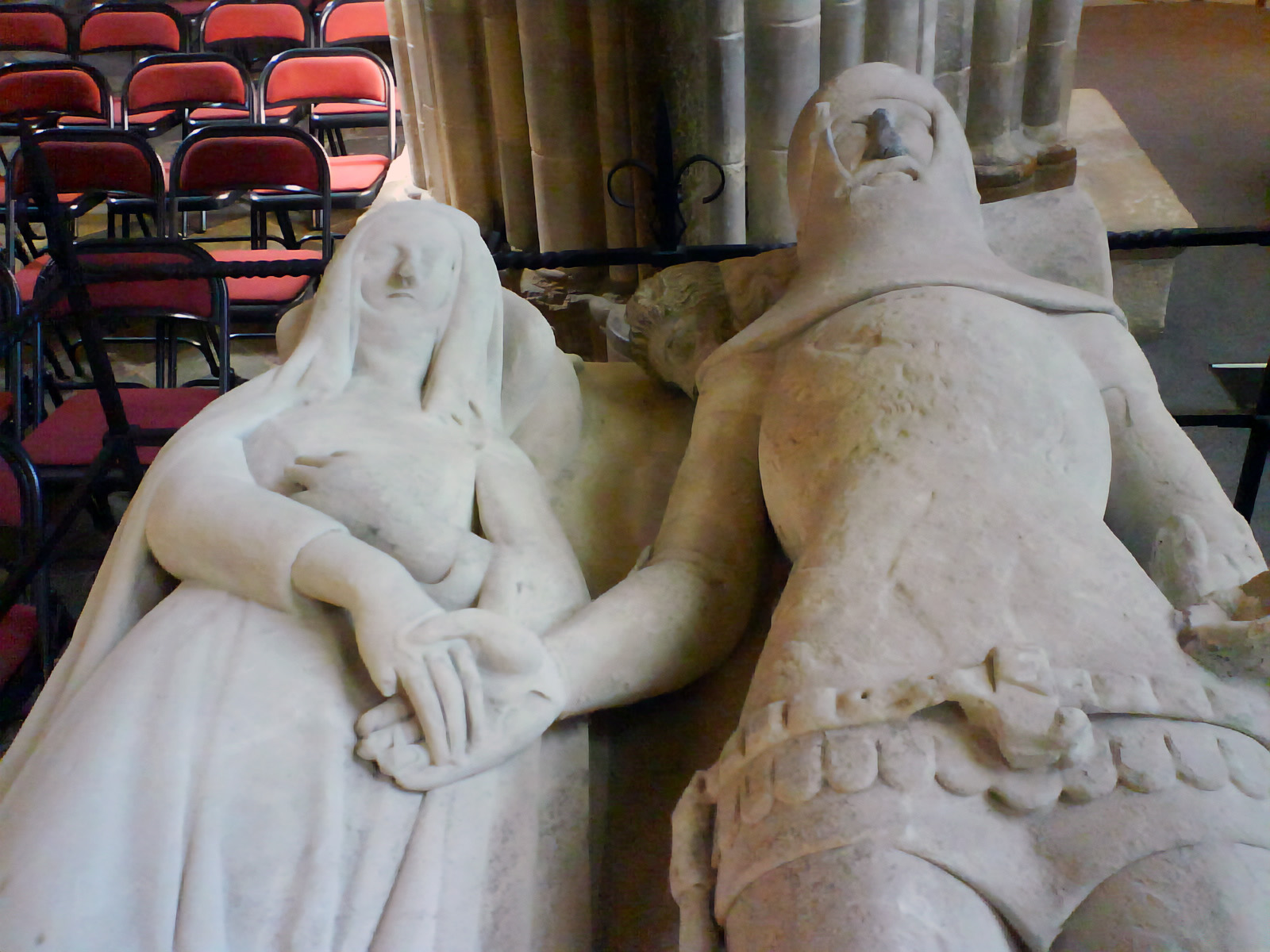
The memorial effigy of Richard Fitzalan and his second wife Eleanor of Lancaster in Chichester Cathedral

Richard died on 24 January 1376 at Arundel Castle, aged either 70 or 63, and was buried in Lewes Priory. He wrote his will on 5 December 1375. In his will, he mentioned his three surviving sons by his second wife, his two surviving daughters Joan, Dowager Countess of Hereford and Alice, Countess of Kent, his grandchildren by his second son John, etc., but left out his bastardized eldest son Edmund. In his will, Richard asked his heirs to be responsible for building the Fitzalan Chapel at Arundel Castle, which was duly erected by his successor. The memorial effigies depicting Richard Fitzalan and his second wife Eleanor of Lancaster in Chichester Cathedral are the subject of the poem "An Arundel Tomb" by Philip Larkin.

Fitzalan died an incredibly wealthy man, despite his various loans to Edward III, leaving £60,000 in cash. He had been as astute in business as he had in diplomatic politics. He was a cautious man, and wisely saved his estate for future generations.

== Ancestry ==
Ancestors of Richard Fitzalan, 3rd Earl of Arundel

8. John Fitzalan III
4. Richard Fitzalan, 1st Earl of Arundel
9. Isabella Mortimer, Countess of Arundel
2. Edmund Fitzalan, 2nd Earl of Arundel
10. Thomas I, Marquess of Saluzzo
5. Alice of Saluzzo, Countess of Arundel
11. Luigia di Ceva
1. Richard Fitzalan, 3rd Earl of Arundel
12. John de Warenne, 6th Earl of Surrey
6. William de Warenne
13. Alice le Brun de Lusignan
3. Alice de Warenne
14. Robert de Vere, 5th Earl of Oxford
7. Joan de Vere
15. Alice de Sanford

== See also ==
- "An Arundel Tomb"
- Edward III of England
- Edward the Black Prince
- Admiral of the West
- Battle of Crécy
- Battle of Winchelsea
- Battle of Sluys

== Sources ==
- Barber, Edward (1978). Edward, Prince of Wales and Aquitaine: A Biography of The Black Prince. Woodbridge. ISBN 9780684158648.
- Bradbury, Jim (2011) [1985]. The Medieval Archer. Woodbridge.
- Burne, Alfred H. (2005) [1955-1956]. The Hundred Years War: A Military History. London. 2 vols.
- Clowes, William Laird (1996) [1897]. The Royal Navy: A History form the Earliest Times to the Present. Vol. I. London: Chatham.
- Rodger, N.A.M. (1997). The Safeguard of the Sea: A Naval History of Britain 660-1649. Vol. 1. London: Harper Collins.
- Froissart, Jean (1895). Macaulay, George Campbell (ed.). The Chronicles of Froissart. Translated by Bourchier, John. London: Macmillan and Son. OCLC 8125361.
- Given-Wilson, C. (1991). "Wealth and Credit, Public and Private: The Earls of Arundel 1306–1397". English Historical Review. 106 (418): 1–26. doi:10.1093/ehr/CVI.CCCCXVIII.1. JSTOR 575362.
- Vivian, J.L., ed. (1895). The Visitations of the County of Devon: Comprising the Heralds' Visitations of 1531, 1564 & 1620. Exeter.
- Weis, Frederick Lewis. Ancestral Roots of Certain American Colonists Who Came to America Before 1700.

Peerage of England
Preceded by Edmund Fitzalan	Earl of Arundel; 1331–1376	Succeeded by Richard Fitzalan
Preceded by John de Warenne	Earl of Surrey; 1347–1376	Succeeded by Richard Fitzalan
