= Alice de Warenne, Countess of Arundel =

English noblewoman

Alice de Warenne
- Countess of Arundel
- Born: 15 June 1287; Warren, Sussex, England
- Died: 23 May 1338 (aged 50)
- Noble family: de Warenne
- Spouse: Edmund FitzAlan, 2nd Earl of Arundel
- Issue: Richard FitzAlan, 3rd Earl of Arundel; Edward FitzAlan; Alice FitzAlan; Joan FitzAlan; Aline FitzAlan; John FitzAlan; Catherine FitzAlan; Elizabeth FitzAlan; Eleanor FitzAlan; Michael FitzAlan
- Father: William de Warenne
- Mother: Joan de Vere

Alice de Warenne, Countess of Arundel (15 June 1287 – 23 May 1338) was an English noblewoman and heir apparent to the Earldom of Surrey. In 1305, she married Edmund FitzAlan, 2nd Earl of Arundel.

== Family ==
Alice, the only daughter of William de Warenne (1256-1286) and Joan de Vere, daughter of Robert de Vere, 5th Earl of Oxford, was born on 15 June 1287 in Warren, Sussex, six months after her father was accidentally killed in a tournament on 15 December 1286. On the death of her paternal grandfather, John de Warenne, 6th Earl of Surrey in 1304, her only sibling John de Warenne, 7th Earl of Surrey succeeded to the earldom. He became estranged from his childless wife and they never reconciled, leaving Alice as the heir presumptive to the Surrey estates and title.

== Marriage to the Earl of Arundel ==
In 1305, Alice married Edmund Fitzalan, 2nd Earl of Arundel, the son of Richard Fitzalan, 1st Earl of Arundel and Alice of Saluzzo. He had initially refused her, however, by 1305, he had changed his mind and they were wed. They had ten recorded children, and their chief residence was Arundel Castle in Sussex.

Arundel inherited his title on 9 March 1302 upon his father's death. He was summoned to Parliament as Lord Arundel in 1306, and was later one of the Lords Ordainers. He also took part in the Scottish wars.

The Earl of Arundel and his brother-in-law John de Warenne were the only nobles who remained loyal to King Edward II, after Queen Isabella and her lover Roger Mortimer, 1st Earl of March returned to England in 1326. He had allied himself to the King's favourite Hugh le Despenser, and agreed to the marriage of his son to Despenser's granddaughter. Arundel had previously been granted many of the traitor Mortimer's forfeited estates, and was appointed Justice of Wales in 1322 and Warden of the Welsh Marches in 1325. He was also made Constable of Montgomery Castle which became his principal base.

The Earl of Arundel was captured in Shropshire by the Queen's party. On 17 November 1326 in Hereford, Arundel was beheaded by order of the Queen, leaving Alice de Warenne a widow. Her husband's estates and titles were forfeited to the Crown following Arundel's execution, but later restored to her eldest son, Richard FitzAlan.

Alice died before 23 May 1338, aged 50. Her brother died in 1347 without legitimate issue, thus the title of Surrey eventually came into the FitzAlan family and passed to Alice's son, Richard.

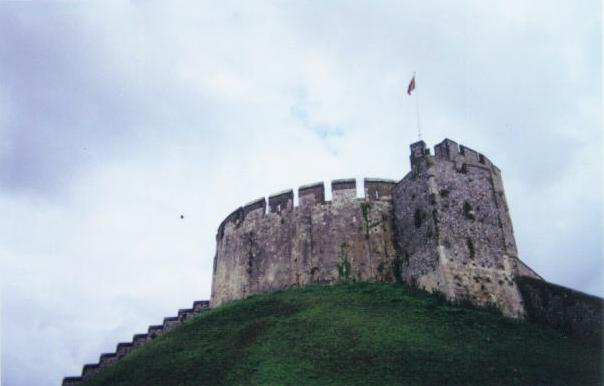
Arundel Castle, the principal residence of the Earls of Arundel

== Issue ==
- Richard FitzAlan, 3rd Earl of Arundel, 8th Earl of Surrey, known as Copped Hat, (1306 Arundel Castle, Sussex – 24 January 1376), also succeeded to the title of Earl of Surrey on 12 April 1361. He married firstly Isabel le Despenser, whom he later repudiated, and was granted an annulment by Pope Clement VI on 4 December 1344 on the grounds that he had been underage and unwilling. He had a son Edmund FitzAlan who was bastardised by the annulment. His second wife, whom he married on 5 February 1345, by Papal dispensation, was Eleanor of Lancaster, with whom he had apparently been having an affair, the daughter of Henry, 3rd Earl of Lancaster and Maud Chaworth. She was the widow of John de Beaumont, 2nd Lord Beaumont. Richard and Eleanor had three sons and four daughters, including Richard FitzAlan, 11th Earl of Arundel and Joan de Bohun, Countess of Hereford.
- Edward or Edmund FitzAlan (1308–1398)
- Alice FitzAlan (born 1310), married John de Bohun, 5th Earl of Hereford.
- Joan FitzAlan (born 1312), married Warin Gerard, Baron L'Isle.
- Aline FitzAlan (1314–1386), married Roger le Strange, 5th Baron Strange of Knockyn, by whom she had issue.
- John FitzAlan, (c. 1348 – 1379), 1st Baron Arundel, 1st Baron Maltravers, who was a Marshall of England, and drowned in 1379. He married Eleanor Maltravers (Mautravers) (1345 – 10 January 1404 or 1406), daughter of John Maltravers, 1st Baron Maltravers and Milicent de Berkeley. The current Duke of Norfolk descends from Lady Mary, Duchess of Norfolk, a daughter and co-heiress of Henry FitzAlan, 12th Earl of Arundel, a descendant of John FitzAlan, 1st Baron Arundel.
- Catherine FitzAlan (died 1376), married firstly Andrew Peverell, and secondly Henry Hussey of Cockfield. Had issue by her second husband.
- Elizabeth FitzAlan (1320–1389), married William Latimer, 4th Baron Latimer, by whom she had one daughter, Elizabeth who married John Neville, 3rd Baron Neville de Raby.
- Eleanor FitzAlan
- Michael FitzAlan, a clerk

== Ancestry ==
Ancestors of Alice de Warenne, Countess of Arundel

16. Hamelin de Warenne
8. William de Warenne, 5th Earl of Surrey
17. Isabel de Warenne, 4th Countess of Surrey
4. John de Warenne, 6th Earl of Surrey
18. William Marshal, 1st Earl of Pembroke
9. Maud Marshal
19. Isabel de Clare, 4th Countess of Pembroke
2. William de Warenne
20. Hugues de Lusignan, Count of La Marche
10. Hugues de Lusignan, Count of La Marche
21. Agathe de Preuilly
5. Alice de Lusignan
22. Aymer Taillefer, Count of Angoulême
11. Isabella Taillefer, Countess of Angoulême
23. Alix de Courtenay
1. Alice de Warenne
24. Robert de Vere, 3rd Earl of Oxford
12. Hugh de Vere, 4th Earl of Oxford
25. Isabel de Bolebec
6. Robert de Vere, 5th Earl of Oxford
26. Saer de Quincy, 1st Earl of Winchester
13. Hawise de Quincy
27. Margaret de Beaumont
3. Joan de Vere
28. John de Sanford
14. Gilbert de Sanford
29. Alice Basset
7. Alice de Sanford
30. Roger la Zouche
15. Loretta la Zouche
31. Margaret Biset
