= Joan Fitzalan, Countess of Hereford =

English noblewoman (1347–1419)

Lady Joan FitzAlan
- Countess of Hereford; Countess of Essex; Countess of Northampton
- Born: 1347; Arundel Castle, Sussex, England
- Died: 7 April 1419 (aged 71–72)
- Noble family: FitzAlan
- Spouse: Humphrey de Bohun, 7th Earl of Hereford, 6th Earl of Essex and 2nd Earl of Northampton
- Issue: Eleanor de Bohun; Mary de Bohun
- Father: Richard Fitzalan, 10th Earl of Arundel
- Mother: Eleanor of Lancaster

Joan FitzAlan, Countess of Hereford, Countess of Essex and Countess of Northampton (1347 – 7 April 1419) was the wife of Humphrey de Bohun, 7th Earl of Hereford, 6th Earl of Essex and 2nd Earl of Northampton. She was the mother of Mary de Bohun, the first wife of Henry of Bolingbroke who later reigned as King Henry IV, and Eleanor de Bohun, Duchess of Gloucester. She was the maternal grandmother of King Henry V.

In 1400, she gave the order for the beheading of the Earl of Huntingdon in revenge for the part he had played in the execution of her brother, the 11th Earl of Arundel.

The estates which comprised Joan's large dowry made her one of the principal landowners in Essex, where she exercised lordship, acting as arbitrator and feoffee in property transactions.

== Family ==
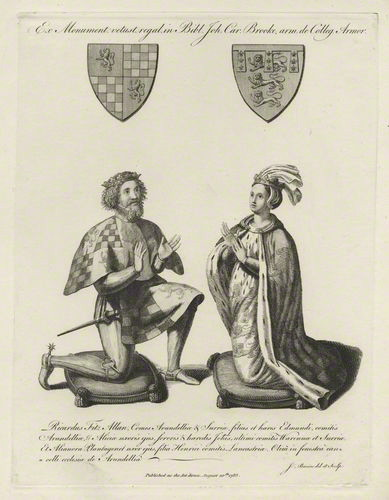
Richard FitzAlan, 10th Earl of Arundel and Eleanor of Lancaster, parents of Lady Joan FitzAlan

Lady Joan FitzAlan was born in 1347 at Arundel Castle, Sussex, one of seven children, and the eldest daughter of Richard FitzAlan, 10th Earl of Arundel and his second wife Eleanor of Lancaster. Her paternal grandparents were Edmund FitzAlan, 9th Earl of Arundel and Alice de Warenne, and her maternal grandparents were Henry, 3rd Earl of Lancaster and Maud Chaworth.

== Marriage and issue ==
Sometime after 9 September 1359, Joan married Humphrey de Bohun, one of the most powerful noblemen in the realm. His titles included 7th Earl of Hereford, 6th Earl of Essex, 2nd Earl of Northampton, and he was the hereditary Constable of England. He was the son of William de Bohun, 1st Earl of Northampton and Elizabeth de Badlesmere. Their marriage united two of the most prominent noble families in the kingdom; an alliance which was further strengthened by her elder brother Richard's marriage to Humphrey's sister, Elizabeth.

Together Humphrey and Joan produced two daughters, who upon the death of their father divided his vast estates between them:

- Eleanor de Bohun (c.1366- 3 October 1399), co-heiress of her father. In 1376 she married Thomas of Woodstock, 1st Duke of Gloucester, the youngest son of King Edward III of England and Philippa of Hainault. The marriage produced five children, including Anne of Gloucester. Eleanor died as a nun at Barking Abbey.
- Mary de Bohun (1369/70- 1394), co-heiress of her father. On 27 July 1380 she married Henry of Bolingbroke, who would later be crowned King Henry IV. She died before he ascended the throne. The marriage produced six children including King Henry V of England.

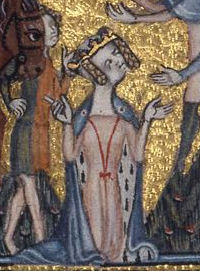
Psalter celebrating the marriage of Joan FitzAlan's daughter Mary de Bohun to Henry of Bolingbroke on 27 July 1380

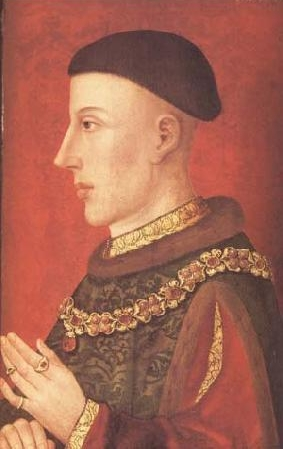
King Henry V of England, grandson of Joan Fitzalan and Humphrey de Bohun, 7th Earl of Hereford

== Widowhood ==
Joan was left a widow in January 1373 at the age of about 25 or 26, and she chose not to remarry. Her two daughters were made wards of Edward III. Sometime after her husband's death, she received from King Edward the manor of Langham, which she held until her own death, among the numerous other manors she owned. The numerous estates which comprised Joan's large dowry ensured that she was one of the principal landowners in Essex. This placed her at the hub of a powerful structure of landed country gentry, who acted as her advisers and officers; Joan in turn acted as "arbitrator, feoffee in property transactions, and intercessor with the royal government".

During the Peasants' Revolt in 1381, some of Joan's manors were sacked by the rebels; this did not deter Joan from expanding and industrialising her lands after the uprising had been put down, having done much to encourage the dyeing and fulling of woollen cloth on some of her estates such as Saffron Walden.

In the Public Record Office, London, there is an extant document, written in Latin, which records the payment to Joan by John of Gaunt for the maintenance of her younger daughter Mary after the latter's marriage until she came of age in 1384.

A member of St. Helen's religious guild in Colchester, Joan founded chantries and was also a patron of Walden Abbey, having donated money for relics, vessels, vestments, and the construction of new buildings. She is described in the State Rolls as having been a "great benefactress" to the monasteries of Essex.

== Execution of John Holland, 1st Duke of Exeter ==
In 1397, Joan's brother Richard Fitzalan, 11th Earl of Arundel and a Lord Appellant was executed on Tower Hill for his opposition to King Richard II of England. The king's half-brother John Holland, 1st Duke of Exeter, Earl of Huntingdon accompanied him to the scaffold, as one of King Richard's representatives. Less than three years later in 1400, when Holland joined a conspiracy to murder the new king Henry IV (Joan's former son-in-law), and was captured near Joan's principal residence Pleshy Castle in Essex, he was turned over to her for punishment. Described as having possessed a "stern character", she showed him no mercy, and promptly gave orders for his decapitation, after having summoned the children of her dead brother to witness the execution. Following the beheading, which was performed without benefit of a trial, she ordered that Holland's severed head be raised on the end of a pike, which was placed upon the battlements of Pleshy Castle.

Henry IV rewarded Joan for her services on behalf of the Crown, by granting her custody of forfeited lands and properties. When Henry died in 1413, Joan's grandson Henry V followed suit; therefore up until her death in 1419, a large number of forfeited estates had come under her control.

== Death ==
Lady Joan FitzAlan died on 7 April 1419 and was buried with her husband in Walden Abbey, which she had previously endowed.

== In fiction ==
Joan appears as a character in Georgette Heyer's last book My Lord John, which is set in the reign of King Henry IV.

== Ancestry ==
Ancestors of Joan Fitzalan, Countess of Hereford

Richard Fitzalan, 8th Earl of Arundel
Edmund Fitzalan, 9th Earl of Arundel
Alice of Saluzzo
Richard Fitzalan, 10th Earl of Arundel
William de Warenne
Alice de Warenne
Joan de Vere
Joan FitzAlan
Edmund Crouchback, 1st Earl of Lancaster
Henry, 3rd Earl of Lancaster
Blanche of Artois
Eleanor of Lancaster
Sir Patrick de Chaworth, Lord of Kidwelly
Maud Chaworth
Isabella de Beauchamp

== Sources ==
- Archer, Rowena E. (1995). "Parliamentary Restoration: John Mowbray and the Dukedom of Norfolk in 1425". In Archer, Rowena E.; Walker, Simon (eds.). Rulers and Ruled in Late Medieval England: Essays Presented to Gerald Harriss. The Hambledon Press. pp. 99–116.
