= Richard Fitzalan =

Richard Fitzalan may refer to:

- Richard Fitzalan, 1st Earl of Arundel (1266/7–1301/2), Anglo-Norman nobleman
- Richard Fitzalan, 3rd Earl of Arundel (c. 1306–1376), Medieval English naval and military commander
- Richard Fitzalan, 4th Earl of Arundel (1346–1397), Medieval English nobleman and military commander
