= Eleanor FitzAlan =

Eleanor Fitzalan (c. 1284 – July/August 1328) was an alleged daughter of Richard FitzAlan, 1st Earl of Arundel and his wife Alice of Saluzzo. She became the wife of Henry de Percy, 1st Baron Percy. Their son was Henry de Percy, 2nd Baron Percy.

== Identity ==
Standard accounts of the Percy family identify Eleanor as the daughter of the "Earl of Arundel".

Arrangements for Eleanor's marriage to Lord Percy are found in the recognizance made in 1300 by Eleanor's father, Richard, Earl of Arundel, for a debt of 2,000 marks which he owed Sir Henry Percy.

Eleanor was styled as a "kinswoman" of Edward II on two occasions; once in 1318 and again in 1322 presumably by her descent from Amadeus IV, Count of Savoy who was the brother of Edward II's great-grandmother, Beatrice of Savoy. Eleanor's brothers, Edmund and John, were also styled as "kinsmen" of the king.

Eleanor's identity is further indicated by the presence of the old and new arms of FitzAlan (or Arundel) at her tomb in Beverley Minster.

== Bibliography ==
- Gee, L. L. (2002). Women, Art and Patronage from Henry III to Edward III: 1216-1377. Woodbridge: Boydell.

== See also ==
- Baron Percy
