= Edmund FitzAlan =

Edmund FitzAlan may refer to:

- Edmund FitzAlan, 2nd Earl of Arundel (1285–1326)
- Edmund FitzAlan, 9th Earl of Arundel
- Edmund FitzAlan, 10th Earl of Arundel
- Edmund FitzAlan, 11th Earl of Arundel

== See also ==
- Edmund FitzAlan-Howard, 1st Viscount FitzAlan of Derwent
