= Edmund Fitzalan (1327-1382) =

English nobleman

Sir Edmund Fitzalan
- Born: c. 1327/9
- Died: bef. 12 February 1382
- Noble family: FitzAlan
- Spouse: Sybil de Montacute
- Issue: 3
- Father: Richard FitzAlan, 10th Earl of Arundel
- Mother: Isabel le Despenser, Countess of Arundel

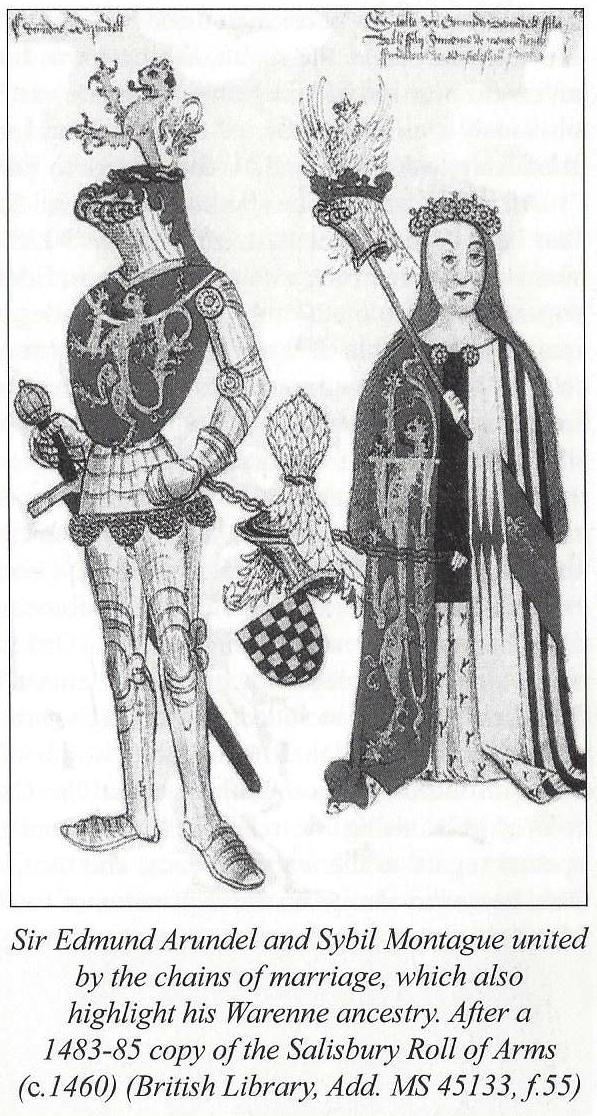

Sir Edmund FitzAlan (c. 1327/9 – before 12 February 1382), Knt., of Chedzoy, Martock, Sutton Montagu, and Thurlbear, Somerset; Chudleigh, Devon; Melbury Bubb, Dorset; Bignor, Trayford and Compton, Sussex, was an English nobleman and the son of Richard FitzAlan, 10th Earl of Arundel and Isabel le Despenser, Countess of Arundel. He was the heir to the earldom of Arundel until he was declared illegitimate by the annulment of his parents' marriage on 4 December 1344. He was sometimes known as Edmund de Arundel.

== Early life ==
FitzAlan was born about 1327 or 1329 and was the only son of Richard FitzAlan, 10th Earl of Arundel and Isabel le Despenser, Countess of Arundel. Martyn John Lawrence claims that he had two sisters called Phillipa and Isabel, while a study also adds one more daughter to them named Laura/Lora, who had an illegitimate daughter by Fernando Afonso de Albuquerque.

His parents had been married in 1321, to cement an alliance between their fathers, Edmund FitzAlan, 2nd Earl of Arundel and Hugh le Despenser, 2nd Baron le Despenser, the favourite of Edward II of England. The King paid for the cloth to be held over the heads of the couple as they knelt at the altar. At the time of their marriage, Isabel was eight and Richard was seven. In 1331 his father became Earl of Arundel.

FitzAlan's mother was the eldest daughter of Hugh le Despenser, 2nd Baron le Despenser and Eleanor de Clare, suo jure 6th Lady of Glamorgan, whose mother was the eldest daughter of Joan of Acre, Princess of England. This made Edmund a great-great-grandson of King Edward I and his first consort, Eleanor of Castile.

== Parents' annulment ==
On 4 December 1344, FitzAlan's father Richard petitioned the pope for an annulment of his marriage to Isabel. King Edward III supported the petition, which was on the grounds that they had never freely consented to marry, that they both had renounced their vows at puberty, but they had been "forced by blows to cohabit, so that a son was born". The annulment was granted by Pope Clement VI and Edmund was declared illegitimate and disinherited.

After the annulment, Isabel retired to five manors in Essex that were given to her by her ex-husband. Richard, following receiving a papal dispensation, married Isabel's widowed first cousin Eleanor of Lancaster, with whom he had apparently been having an affair. Richard and Eleanor had five children who survived into adulthood.

In 1347, FitzAlan protested bitterly to the pope about his illegitimacy and treatment and that the annulment of his parents marriage had been surreptitiously obtained, but was apparently ignored.

== Marriage and issue ==
FitzAlan married before 1347 (betrothed in January 1331 and married probably as a child), Lady Sybil de Montacute (or Montagu), daughter of the deceased William Montacute, 1st Earl of Salisbury and Catherine Grandison, whose sister Elizabeth was married to his maternal uncle. They had three daughters who were his co-heiresses and who brought a failed suit in 1382 against their half-uncle the Earl:

- Elizabeth (or Alice) de Arundel, who married firstly Sir Leonard Carew (1343–1369) of Mohuns Ottery in Devon, feudal lord of Carew Castle in Pembrokeshire and lord of the manor of Moulsford in Berkshire, and secondly John de Meriet. From Alice are descended all the members of the prominent and widespread Carew family, except Carew of Beddington in Surrey, descended from one of Sir Leonard's great-granduncles. (See Baron Carew, Earl of Totnes, Carew baronets.)
- Philippa de Arundel (died 13 September 1399), who married as his second wife Sir Richard Sergeaux, Knt., of Colquite, Cornwall. A Victorian historical novel ascribes the following five children to her: 1. Richard, born 21 December 1376, and died childless, 24 June 1396; 2. Elizabeth, born 1379, wife of Sir William Marny; 3. Philippa, born 1381, wife of Sir Robert Pashley; 4. Alice, born at Kilquyt on 1 September 1384 and died on 18 May 1452, later Countess of Oxford, who married firstly Guy de St Aubyn of St. Erme, Cornwall, and secondly about 1406–7 (as his second wife) the 11th Earl of Oxford and widower of Alice de Holand (d.s.p. 1406, niece of Henry IV), and by him was the mother of two sons, John de Vere, 12th Earl of Oxford, and Robert de Vere, whose grandson, John, became the 15th Earl of Oxford; 5. Joan, born 1393, died 21 February 1400. "Philippa became a widow, 30 September 1393, and died 13 September 1399.".
- Katherine de Arundel, who married Robert Deincourt.

== Career ==
FitzAlan was knighted in 1352 at about 23 years of age and became an aristocratic knight who owned numerous manors throughout the counties of Devon, Dorset, Somerset, and Sussex. In 1359-60 he fought with his own retinue in France; and in 1363 he was appointed to a commission of oyer and terminer in Devon. In 1364, he was sent to Flanders on the king's service; then, in 1368, Pope Urban V sent him to King Edward III to communicate verbally "the present state of the Roman church in Italy". In 1369 and 1370, FitzAlan fought in several military campaigns in France including the Battle of Pontvallain under the command of his second cousin once removed, Edward the Black Prince, during the Hundred Years' War. Certainly his standing by the late 1360s was significant.

When his father died in 1376, FitzAlan quarrelled with his half-siblings, the children of his father's second marriage, over inheritance rights, mainly his half-brother Richard's inheritance of the earldom and associated lands and titles and apparently tried to claim the six manors allotted to his deceased mother. He was imprisoned in the Tower of London in 1377 until he was released in the same year by request of two of his brothers-in-law (his wife's brother John de Montacute and the second husband of Elizabeth de Montacute, Lady Le Despencer), who stood mainprise for him. Despite his persistent protests, he eventually lost his inheritance.

In February 1381, FitzAlan went to Gascony on a military expedition and died sometime before 12 February 1382. After his death, his daughters brought a failed suit in 1382 against their half-uncle, Richard FitzAlan, 11th Earl of Arundel (died 1397).
