= Isabel le Despenser =

Isabel le Despenser may refer to:

- Isabel le Despenser, Countess of Arundel (1312–1356), daughter of Hugh Despenser the Younger and Eleanor de Clare
- Isabel le Despenser, Countess of Worcester and Warwick (1400–1439), daughter of Thomas le Despenser, 1st Earl of Gloucester and Constance of York
