= Joan Fitzalan (disambiguation) =

Joan Fitzalan or (FitzAlan) may refer to:

- Joan Fitzalan, Countess of Hereford, Countess of Essex and Countess of Northampton (1347/1348–1419), daughter of Richard FitzAlan, 10th Earl of Arundel and Eleanor of Lancaster
- Joan Fitzalan (c. 1360 – 1404); daughter of John FitzAlan, 1st Baron Arundel, granddaughter of Richard Fitzalan, 10th Earl of Arundel and Eleanor of Lancaster
- Joan FitzAlan, Baroness Bergavenny (1375–1435), daughter of Richard Fitzalan, 11th Earl of Arundel] and Elizabeth de Bohun
