= Edmund Fitzalan, 2nd Earl of Arundel =

English nobleman (1285–1326)

Edmund Fitzalan
- Earl of Arundel
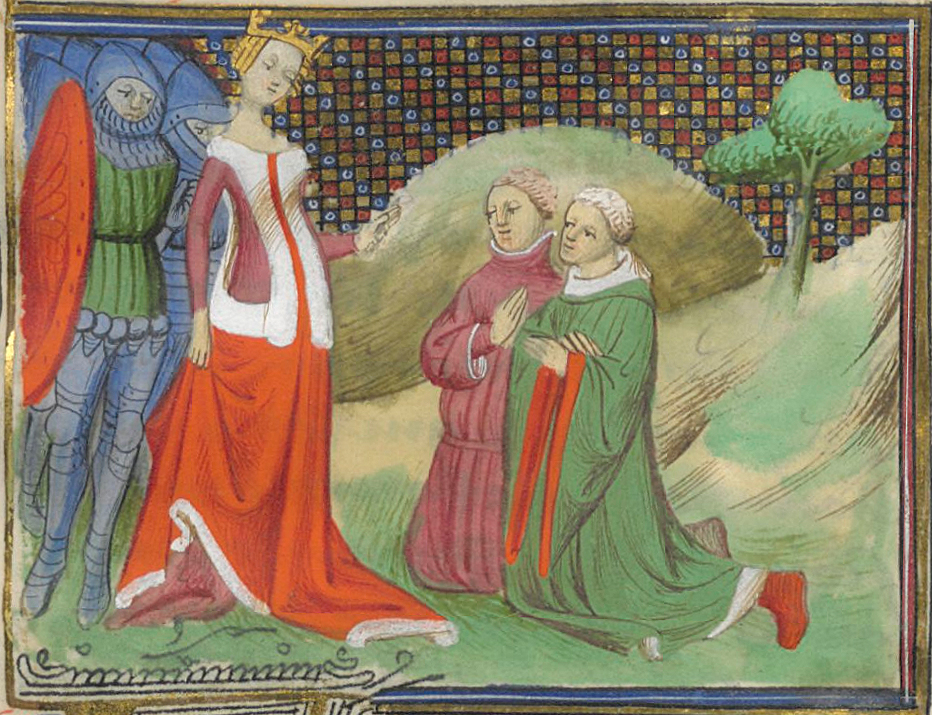
- Froissart's Chronicles: Arundel and Hugh Despenser the Elder before Queen Isabella
- Tenure: 1306–1326
- Predecessor: Richard Fitzalan, 1st Earl of Arundel
- Successor: Richard Fitzalan, 3rd Earl of Arundel
- Known for: Adherence to Edward II
- Years active: 1306–1326
- Born: 1 May 1285; Marlborough Castle, Wiltshire
- Died: 17 November 1326 (aged 41); Hereford
- Cause of death: Executed
- Buried: Haughmond Abbey, Shropshire; 52.73249°N 2.67970°W
- Residence: Arundel Castle
- Locality: Welsh Marches, Sussex
- Wars and battles: Scottish Wars; Despenser War
- Offices: Justice of Wales, Warden of the Marches of Scotland
- Noble family: FitzAlan
- Spouse: Alice de Warenne
- Issue: Richard Fitzalan, 3rd Earl of Arundel (among others...)
- Father: Richard Fitzalan, 1st Earl of Arundel
- Mother: Alice of Saluzzo

Edmund Fitzalan, 2nd Earl of Arundel (Note: The Earls of Arundel have been numbered differently depending on whether the claims of the first seven to have been Earls by tenancy are accepted. Edmund Fitzalan was the second member of the Fitzalan family to be definitely styled Earl of Arundel. He is therefore counted variously as the 2nd, 7th or 9th Earl.) (1 May 1285 – 17 November 1326), was an English nobleman prominent in the conflict between King Edward II and his barons. His father, Richard Fitzalan, 1st Earl of Arundel, died in 1302, while Edmund was still a minor. He, therefore, became a ward of John de Warenne, Earl of Surrey, and married Warenne's granddaughter, Alice. In 1306 he was styled Earl of Arundel, and served under Edward I in the Scottish Wars, for which he was richly rewarded.

After Edward I's death, Arundel became part of the opposition to the new king Edward II, and his favourite Piers Gaveston. In 1311 he was one of the so-called Lords Ordainers who assumed control of the government from the king. Together with Thomas, Earl of Lancaster, he was responsible for the death of Gaveston in 1312. From this point on, however, his relationship with the king became more friendly. This was to a large extent due to his association with the king's new favourite Hugh Despenser the Younger, whose daughter was married to Arundel's son. Arundel supported the king in suppressing rebellions by Roger Mortimer and other marcher lords, and eventually also Thomas of Lancaster. For this, he was awarded land and offices.

His fortune changed, however, when the country was invaded in 1326 by Mortimer, who had made common cause with the king's wife, Queen Isabella. Immediately after the capture of Edward II, the queen, Edward III's regent, ordered Arundel executed, his title forfeit and his property confiscated. Arundel's son and heir Richard only recovered the title and lands in 1331, after Edward III had taken power from the regency of Isabella and Mortimer. In the 1390s, a cult emerged around the late earl. He was venerated as a martyr, though he was never canonised.

== Family and early life ==
Edmund Fitzalan was born in the Castle of Marlborough, in Wiltshire, on 1 May 1285. He was the son of Richard Fitzalan, 1st Earl of Arundel (1267–1302), and his wife, Alice of Saluzzo, daughter of Thomas, marquess of Saluzzo in Italy. Richard had been in opposition to the king during the political crisis of 1295, and as a result, he had incurred great debts and had parts of his land confiscated. When Richard died on 9 March 1302, Edmund's wardship was given to John de Warenne, Earl of Surrey. Warenne's only son, William, had died in 1286, so his daughter Alice was now heir apparent to the Warenne earldom. Alice was offered in marriage to Edmund, who for unknown reasons initially refused her. By 1305 he had changed his mind, however, and the two were married.

In April 1306, shortly before turning twenty-one, Edmund was granted possession of his father's title and land. On 22 May 1306, he was knighted by Edward I, along with the young Prince Edward (the future Edward II). The knighting was done in expectation of military service during the Scottish Wars, and after the campaign was over, Arundel was richly rewarded. Edward I pardoned the young earl a debt of £4,234. This flow of patronage continued after the death of Edward I in 1307; in 1308 Edward II returned the hundred of Purslow to Arundel, an honour that Edward I had confiscated from Edmund's father. There were also official honours in the early years of Edward II's reign. At the new king's coronation on 25 February 1308, Arundel officiated as chief butler (or pincerna), a hereditary office of the earls of Arundel.

== Opposition to Edward II ==
Though the reign of Edward II was initially harmonious, he soon met with opposition from several of his earls and prelates. At the source of the discontent was the king's relationship with the young Gascon knight Piers Gaveston, who had been exiled by Edward I, but was recalled immediately upon Edward II's accession. Edward's favouritism towards the upstart Gaveston was an offence to the established nobility, and his elevation to the earldom of Cornwall was particularly offensive. A group of magnates led by Henry de Lacy, Earl of Lincoln, forced Gaveston into exile in 1308. By 1309, however, Edward had reconciled himself with the opposition, and Gaveston was allowed to return.

Arundel joined the opposition at an early point, and did not attend the Stamford parliament in July 1309, where Gaveston's return was negotiated. After Gaveston returned, his behaviour became even more offensive, and opposition towards him grew. In addition to this, there was great discontent with Edward II's failure to follow up his father's Scottish campaigns. On 16 March 1310, the king had to agree to the appointment of a committee known as the Lords Ordainers, who were to be in charge of the reform of the royal government. Arundel was one of eight earls among the twenty-one Ordainers.

The Ordainers once more sent Gaveston into exile in 1311, but by 1312 he was back. Now the king's favourite was officially an outlaw, and Arundel was among the earls who swore to hunt him down. The leader of the opposition—after Lincoln's death the year before—was now Thomas, Earl of Lancaster. In June 1312 Gaveston was captured, tried before Lancaster, Arundel and the earls of Warwick and Hereford, and executed. A reconciliation was achieved between the king and the offending magnates, and Arundel and the others received pardons, but animosity prevailed. In 1314 Arundel was among the magnates who refused to assist Edward in a campaign against the Scots, contributing to the disastrous English defeat at the Battle of Bannockburn.

== Return to loyalty ==
Around the time of Bannockburn, however, Arundel's loyalty began to shift back towards the king. Edward's rapprochement towards the earl had in fact started earlier, when on 2 November 1313, the king pardoned Arundel's royal debts. The most significant factor in this process though, was the marriage alliance between Arundel and the king's new favourites, the Despensers. Hugh Despenser the Younger and his father Hugh Despenser the Elder were gradually taking over control of the government, and using their power to enrich themselves. While this alienated most of the nobility, Arundel's situation was different. At some point in 1314–1315, his son Richard was betrothed to Isabel, daughter of Hugh Despenser the Younger. Now that he found himself back in royal favour, Arundel started receiving rewards in the form of official appointments. In 1317 he was appointed Warden of the Marches of Scotland, and in August 1318, he helped negotiate the Treaty of Leake, which temporarily reconciled the king with Thomas of Lancaster.

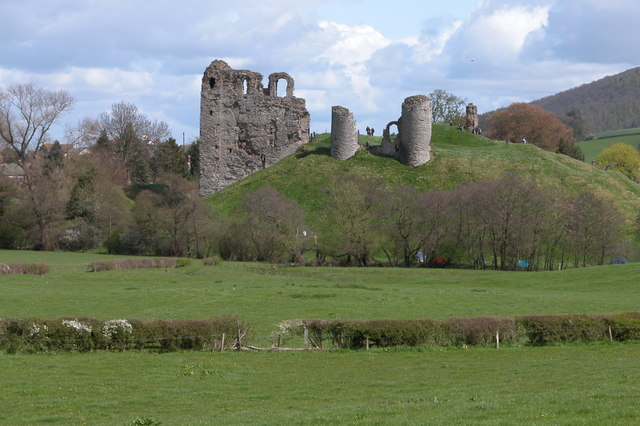
Clun Castle was the source of the personal animosity between Arundel and Roger Mortimer.

With Arundel's change of allegiance came a conflict of interest. In August 1321, a demand was made to the king that Hugh Despenser and his father, Hugh Despenser the Elder, be sent into exile. The king, facing a rebellion in the Welsh Marches, had no choice but to assent. Arundel voted for the expulsion, but later he claimed that he did so under compulsion, and also supported their recall in December. Arundel had suffered personally from the rebellion, when Roger Mortimer seized his castle of Clun. Early in 1322, Arundel joined King Edward in a campaign against the Mortimer family. The opposition soon crumbled, and the king decided to move against Thomas of Lancaster, who had been supporting the marcher rebellion all along. Lancaster was defeated at the Battle of Boroughbridge in March, and executed.

In the aftermath of the rebellion, the Despensers enriched themselves on the forfeited estates of the rebels, and Hugh Despenser the Elder was created Earl of Winchester in May 1322. Also Arundel, who was now one of the king's principal supporters, was richly rewarded. After the capture of Roger Mortimer in 1322, he received the forfeited Mortimer lordship of Chirk in Wales. He was also trusted with important offices: he became Chief Justiciar of North and South Wales in 1323, and in 1325 he was made Warden of the Welsh Marches, responsible for the array in Wales. He also extended his influence through marriage alliances; in 1325 he secured marriages between two of his daughters and the sons and heirs of two of Lancaster's main allies: the deceased earls of Hereford and Warwick. (Note: Neither of these arrangements was very fruitful; Alice, who married John de Bohun, the later Earl of Hereford, was dead already in 1326. It is unknown which daughter was supposed to marry Thomas de Beauchamp, the heir to the earldom of Warwick, but the marriage never took place.)

== Final years and death ==
In 1323, Roger Mortimer, who had been held in captivity in the Tower of London, escaped and fled to France. Two years later, Queen Isabella travelled to Paris on an embassy to the French king. Here, Isabella and Mortimer developed a plan to invade England and replace Edward II on the throne with his son, the young Prince Edward, who was in the company of Isabella. Isabella and Mortimer landed in England on 24 September 1326, and due to the virulent resentment against the Despenser regime, few came to the king's aid. Arundel initially escaped the invading force in the company of the king, but was later dispatched to his estates in Shropshire to gather troops. At Shrewsbury he was captured by his old enemy John Charlton of Powys, and brought to Queen Isabella at Hereford. On 17 November—the day after Edward II had been taken captive—Arundel was executed, allegedly on the instigation of Mortimer. According to a chronicle account, the use of a blunt sword was ordered, and the executioner needed 22 strokes to sever the earl's head from his body.

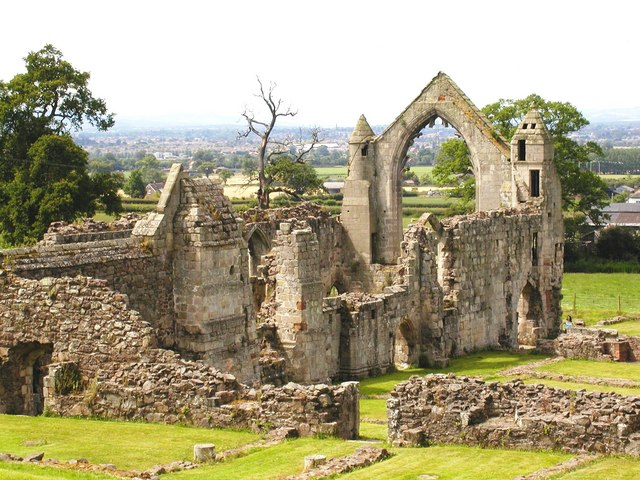
The ruins of Haughmond Abbey, Arundel's final resting place

Arundel's body was initially interred at the Franciscan church in Hereford. It had been his wish, however, to be buried at the family's traditional resting place of Haughmond Abbey in Shropshire, and this is where he was finally buried. Though he was never canonised, a cult emerged around the late earl in the 1390s, associating him with the ninth-century martyr king St Edmund. This veneration may have been inspired by a similar cult around his grandson, Richard Fitzalan, 4th Earl of Arundel, who was executed by Richard II in 1397.

Arundel was attainted at his execution; his estates were forfeited to the crown, and large parts of these were appropriated by Isabella and Mortimer. The castle and honour of Arundel were briefly held by Edward II's half-brother Edmund, Earl of Kent, who was executed on 19 March 1330. Edmund Fitzalan's son, Richard, failed in an attempted rebellion against the crown in June 1330, and had to flee to France. In October the same year, the guardianship of Isabella and Mortimer was supplanted by the personal rule of King Edward III. This allowed Richard to return and reclaim his inheritance, and on 8 February 1331, he was fully restored to his father's lands, and created Earl of Arundel.

== Issue ==
Edmund and Alice had at least seven children:

Name	Birth date	Death date	Notes
Richard Fitzalan, 3rd Earl of Arundel	c. 1313	24 January 1376	Married (1) Isabel le Despenser, (2) Eleanor of Lancaster
Edmund	—	c. 1349	
Michael	—	—	
Mary	—	29 August 1396	Married John le Strange, 4th Baron Strange of Blackmere
Aline	—	20 January 1386	Married Roger le Strange, 5th Baron Strange of Knockin
Alice	—	1326	Married John de Bohun, 5th Earl of Hereford
Katherine	—	died 1375/76	Married (1) Henry Hussey, 2nd Baron Hussey, (2) Andrew Peverell
Eleanor	—	—	Married Gerard de Lisle, 1st Baron Lisle
Elizabeth	—	—	Married William Latimer, 4th Baron Latimer

== Ancestry ==
Ancestors of Edmund Fitzalan, 2nd Earl of Arundel

8. John Fitzalan II
4. John Fitzalan III
9. Maud de Verdon
2. Richard Fitzalan, 1st Earl of Arundel
10. Roger Mortimer, 1st Baron Mortimer
5. Isabella Mortimer
11. Maud de Braose
1. Edmund Fitzalan, 2nd Earl of Arundel
12. Manfredo III del Vasto, Marquess of Saluzzo
6. Tommaso I del Vasto, Marquess of Saluzzo
13. Beatrice of Savoy
3. Alasia del Vasto di Saluzzo
14. Giorgio del Vasto, Marquess of Ceva
7. Luisa del Vasto di Ceva
15. Menzia d'Este

== Sources ==
- Burtscher, Michael (2008). The Fitzalans: Earls of Arundel and Surrey, Lords of the Welsh Marches (1267–1415). Glasgow: Logaston Press. ISBN 978-1-904396-94-9.
- Cokayne, George (1910–1959). The Complete Peerage of England, Scotland, Ireland, Great Britain and the United Kingdom. Vol. i (New ed.). London: The St. Catherine Press.
- Davies, R.R. (2004). "Mortimer, Roger (V), first earl of March (1287–1330)". Oxford Dictionary of National Biography. Oxford: Oxford University Press. doi:10.1093/ref:odnb/19354.
- Fryde, E. B. (1961). Handbook of British Chronology (Second ed.). London: Royal Historical Society.
- Given-Wilson, Chris (2004). "Fitzalan, Edmund, second earl of Arundel (1285–1326)". Oxford Dictionary of National Biography (online ed.). Oxford University Press. doi:10.1093/ref:odnb/9529. (Subscription, Wikipedia Library access or UK public library membership required.)
- Haines, Roy Martin (2003). King Edward II: His Life, His Reign, and Its Aftermath, 1284–1330. Montréal, London: McGill-Queen's Press. ISBN 0-7735-2432-0.
- Hamilton, J. S. (1988). Piers Gaveston, Earl of Cornwall, 1307–1312: Politics and Patronage in the Reign of Edward II. Detroit; London: Wayne State University Press; Harvester-Wheatsheaf. ISBN 0-8143-2008-2.
- Hamilton, J. S. (2004). "Despenser, Hugh, the younger, first Lord Despenser (d. 1326)". Oxford Dictionary of National Biography (online ed.). Oxford University Press. doi:10.1093/ref:odnb/7554. (Subscription, Wikipedia Library access or UK public library membership required.)
- McKisack, May (1959). The Fourteenth Century: 1307–1399. Oxford: Oxford University Press. ISBN 0-19-821712-9.
- Maddicott, J.R. (1970). Thomas of Lancaster, 1307–1322. Oxford: Oxford University Press. ISBN 0-19-821837-0.
- Morris, Marc (2008). A Great and Terrible King: Edward I and the Forging of Britain (updated ed.). London: Hutchinson. ISBN 978-0-09-179684-6.
- Prestwich, Michael (2007). Plantagenet England: 1225–1360 (new ed.). Oxford: Oxford University Press. ISBN 978-0-19-822844-8.
- Tuck, Anthony (1985). Crown and Nobility 1272–1461: Political Conflict in Late Medieval England. London: Fontana. ISBN 0-00-686084-2.

Edmund Fitzalan, 2nd Earl of Arundel FitzAlan Born: 1 May 1285 Died: 17 November 1326
Peerage of England
Preceded by Richard Fitzalan	Earl of Arundel; 1302–1326	Succeeded by Richard Fitzalan
