= Alice of Saluzzo, Countess of Arundel =

Savoyard noblewoman and English countess

Alice of Saluzzo
- Countess of Arundel
- Born: Saluzzo, Piedmont, Italy
- Died: 25 September 1292
- Buried: Haughmond Abbey, Shropshire, England
- Noble family: Aleramici (by birth); Fitzalan (by marriage)
- Spouse: Richard Fitzalan, 1st Earl of Arundel
- Issue: Edmund Fitzalan, 2nd Earl of Arundel; John Fitzalan; Alice Fitzalan; Margaret Fitzalan; Eleanor Fitzalan
- Father: Thomas I of Saluzzo
- Mother: Luigia di Ceva

Alice of Saluzzo, Countess of Arundel (died 25 September 1292) also known as Alasia di Saluzzo, was a Northern-Italian noblewoman of the Frankish dynasty of the Aleramici. She became Countess of Arundel in 1289 through her marriage to Richard Fitzalan, 1st Earl of Arundel.

== Family ==
Alice was born in Saluzzo (present-day Province of Cuneo, Piedmont); the second of fifteen children of Thomas I, 4th Margrave of Saluzzo, and Aloisia di Ceva, daughter of Guglielmo II, Marquis of Ceva. Her paternal grandmother, Beatrice of Savoy, was a first cousin to Queen Eleonor of Provence (wife of Henry III), and namesake of the Queen's mother (sister of the former's father). It was in fact Queen Eleonor who in 1247 arranged the marriage of her niece Alasia of Saluzzo (Alice's paternal aunt) to Edmund de Lacy, Baron of Pontefract, successor to the Earldom of Lincoln.

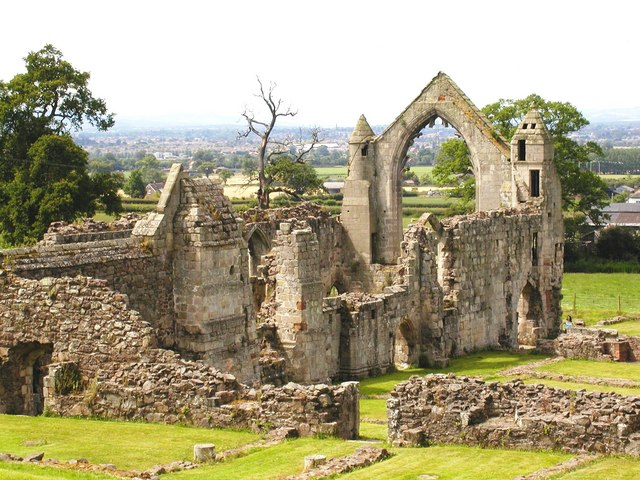
The ruins of Haughmond Abbey, burial place of Alice of Saluzzo

== Marriage and issue ==
Sometime before 1285 Alice arrived in England and, through the intervention of her great-aunt Queen Eleanor, married Richard Fitzalan, feudal lord of Clun and Oswestry in the Welsh Marches, the son and heir of John Fitzalan, 7th Earl of Arundel and Isabella Mortimer. Richard would succeed to the title of Earl of Arundel in 1289, thus making Alice the 8th Countess of Arundel.

Richard and Alice's principal residence was Marlborough Castle in Wiltshire, but Richard also held Arundel Castle in Sussex and the castles of Clun and Oswestry in Shropshire. Her husband was knighted by King Edward I in 1289, and fought in the Welsh Wars (1288–1294), and later in the Scottish Wars. The marriage produced:

- Edmund FitzAlan, 2nd Earl of Arundel (1 May 1285 – 17 November 1326 by execution), married Alice de Warenne, by whom he had issue.
- John FitzAlan, a priest
- Alice FitzAlan (died 17 Mar 1416), married Stephen de Segrave, 3rd Lord Segrave, by whom she had issue.
- Maud, married Philip Burnell
- Margaret FitzAlan, married William le Botiller, by whom she had issue.
- Eleanor FitzAlan, married Henry de Percy, 1st Baron Percy, by whom she had issue.

Alice died on 25 September 1292 and was buried in Haughmond Abbey, Shropshire. Alice's husband Richard died on 9 March 1302 and was buried alongside her. In 1341, provision was made for twelve candles to be burned beside their tombs. The abbey is now a ruin as the result of a fire during the English Civil War.

== Sources ==
  - Given-Wilson, Chris (2004). "Fitzalan, Richard, first earl of Arundel". Oxford Dictionary of National Biography (online ed.). Oxford University Press. (Subscription, Wikipedia Library access or UK public library membership required.)
