= Henry Percy, 1st Baron Percy =

English magnate (1273–1314)

Henry de Percy
- Ordinancer
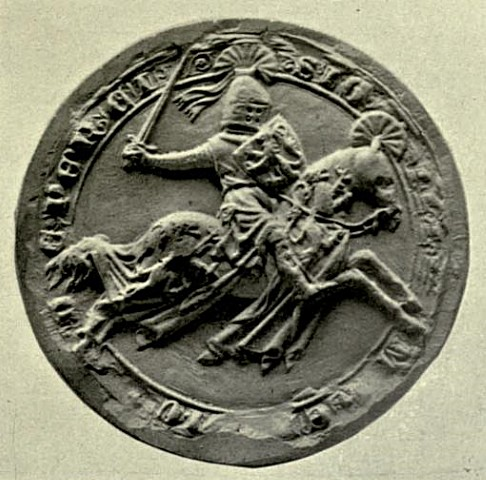
- Seal of Henry Percy from the Barons' Letter, 1301. On his shield he bears the arms of Brabant (Percy modern).
- Successor: Henry de Percy, 2nd Baron Percy
- Born: 25 March 1273; Petworth, Sussex, England
- Died: 2–10 October 1314 (aged 41); Alnwick, Northumberland, England
- Wife: Eleanor FitzAlan
- Issue: Henry de Percy, 2nd Baron Percy; William de Percy

Left: Paternal arms of Henry Percy: Azure, five fusils in fess or, ("Percy ancient") which he abandoned in favour of right: Or, a lion rampant azure ("Percy modern"/Brabant)

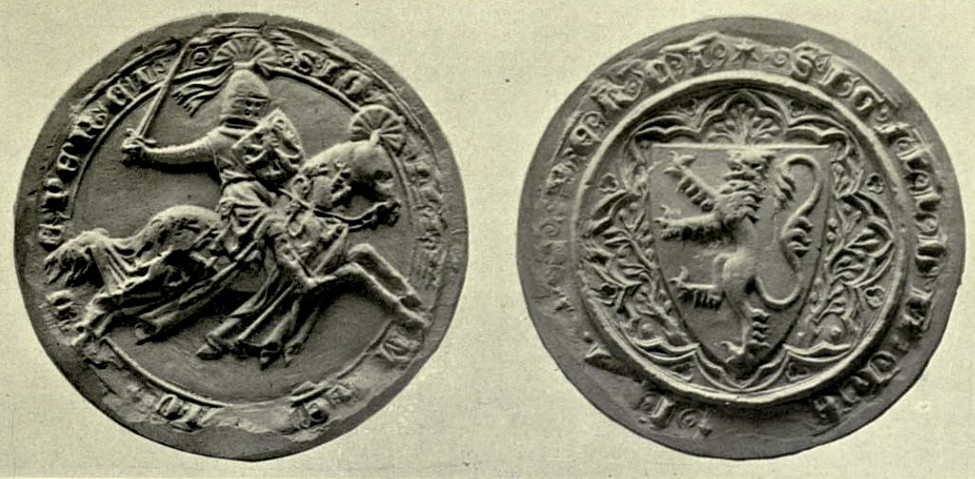
Seal of Henry Percy from the Barons' Letter, 1301, which he signed as Henricus de Percy, D(omi)n(u)s de Topclive (Henry de Percy, Lord (feudal baron) of Topcliffe). His seal bears the legend: SIGILLUM HENRICI DE PERCY/SIGILLUM HENRICI DE PERCI ("seal of Henry de Percy").

Henry de Percy, 1st Baron Percy of Alnwick (25 March 1273 – October 1314) was a medieval English magnate.

He fought under King Edward I of England in Wales and Scotland and was granted extensive estates in Scotland, which were later retaken by the Scots under King Robert I of Scotland. He added Alnwick to the family estates in England, founding a dynasty of northern warlords. He rebelled against King Edward II over the issue of Piers Gaveston and was imprisoned for a few months. After his release, he declined to fight under Edward II at the Battle of Bannockburn, remaining at Alnwick, where he died a few months later, aged 41.

== Origins ==
Henry was born at Petworth in Sussex in 1273, seven months after his father's death, saving the family line from extinction, as two older brothers had died in infancy, and all six uncles had died without leaving any legitimate heirs. He was fortunate in having the powerful John de Warenne, 6th Earl of Surrey as his maternal grandfather. Henry was the son of Henry de Percy (d. 1272), 7th feudal baron of Topcliffe, Yorkshire, by his wife, Eleanor de Warenne, daughter of John de Warenne, 6th Earl of Surrey by Alice de Lusignan, Countess of Surrey, half-sister of King Henry III. His grandfather was William de Percy, and his great-great-grandfather was Jocelin de Louvain (d. 1180) who had married Agnes de Percy (d. 1203), one of the two daughters and co-heiresses of William II de Percy (d.1174/5), 3rd feudal baron of Topcliffe, whose descendants had adopted the surname "de Percy".

== Majority and change of arms ==
Arms of Percy (ancient): Azure, five fusils in fess or

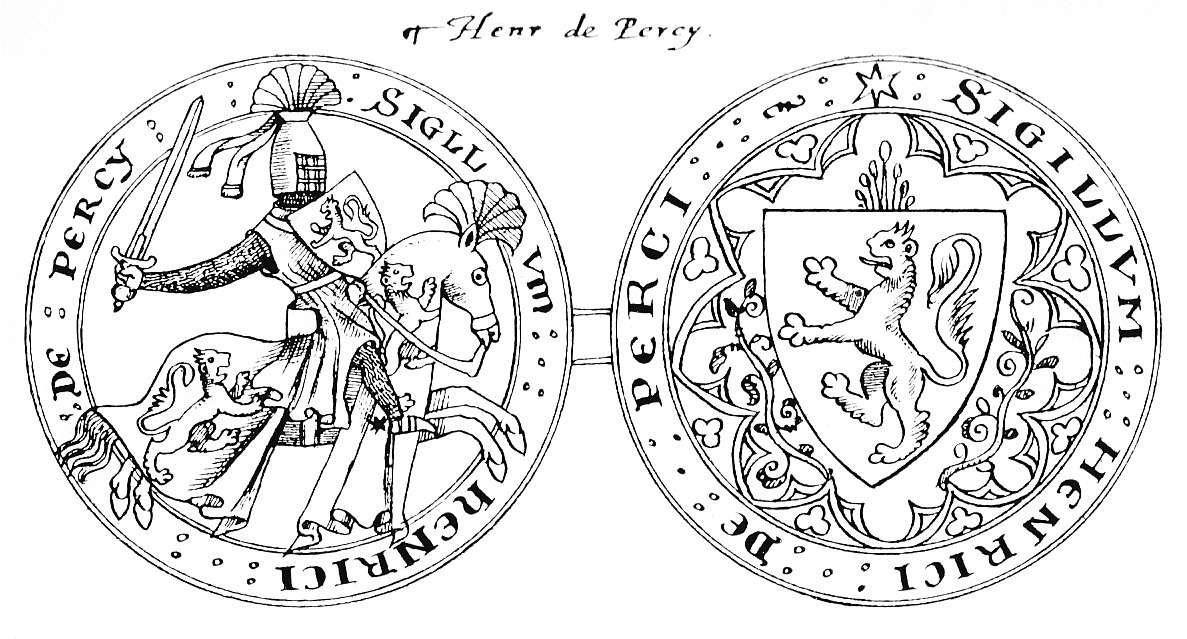
Drawing made in 1611 of seal of Henry de Percy attached to the Barons' Letter, 1301, after changing his arms to (Percy (modern): Or, a lion rampant azure.

In 1293, Henry came into his inheritance of estates in Sussex and Yorkshire, including Topcliffe Castle, the ancient family seat. In 1294 he married Eleanor, daughter of the Earl of Arundel. He then proceeded to change the family coat of arms from Azure, five fusils in fess or ("Percy ancient") to Or, a lion rampant azure ("Percy modern"). Blue and gold were the Earl Warenne's colours and a gold lion rampant had been the Arundel's arms. Alternatively, the arms are said to be the arms of Brabant. This emphasised his royal and noble connections and marked his ambition. This was also the year he went to war for the first time, summoned to fight in France, but then diverted to Wales to join Edward I in suppressing a Welsh rebellion. There he learned the grim business of medieval warfare, and command and supply of armies in the field.

== Marriage and progeny ==
Henry de Percy married Eleanor FitzAlan, daughter of Richard FitzAlan, 1st Earl of Arundel, and had two sons:

- Henry de Percy, 2nd Baron Percy (b. 1301), who succeeded his father
- William de Percy (c. 1303 – 1355)

== Knighthood and war in Scotland ==
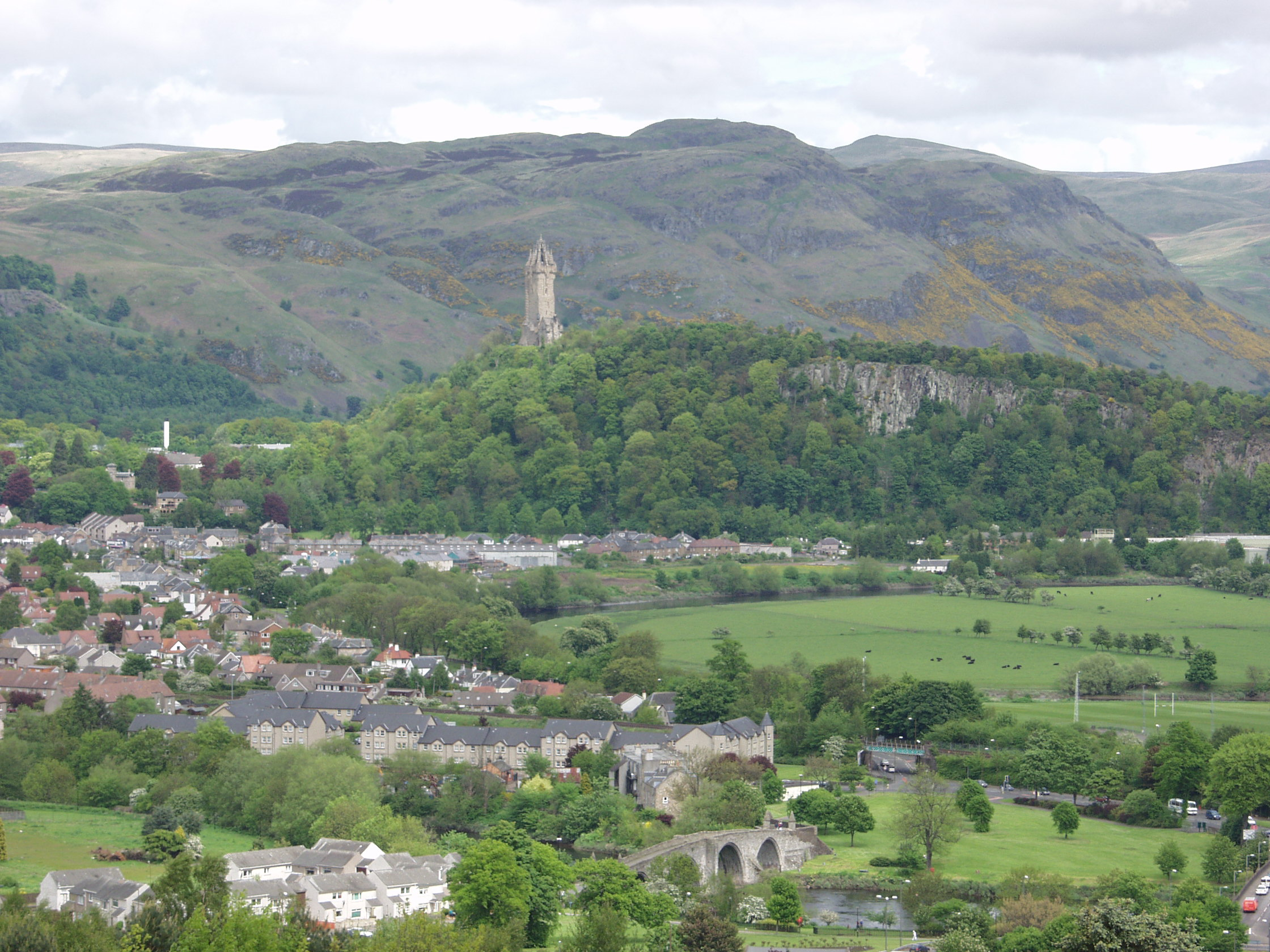
The view from Stirling Castle with the present Stirling Bridge in the foreground and the Wallace Monument in the middle distance

By the summer of 1295, Henry was in the north with his grandfather Earl Warenne. Edward I's deliberately humiliating treatment of King John I of Scotland and his nobles was making war inevitable. Warenne was King John's father in law, used as an intermediary by Edward. In 1294 Philip IV of France had taken back Aquitaine from the English crown and now negotiated a treaty with the Scots to wage war on Edward on two fronts. During March 1296 Edward I's army surrounded Berwick on Tweed, then the largest town in Scotland and an important seaport. It was here on 30 March that Henry Percy was knighted by the king. Later on the same day the town was taken and the ruthless king, apparently provoked by the inhabitants previously baring their buttocks at him, ordered the city put to the sword "whatever the age or sex" and according to the Scotichronicon 7,500 were executed.

Percy, under Warenne's command, was sent north to Dunbar where the castle was held by the Earls of Mar, Menteith and Ross, together with many lesser nobles. After they had beaten a Scottish force outside the castle the king joined them, and the castle soon surrendered. The rest of Scotland was occupied in the space of a few weeks and English administrators installed. King John Balliol was forced to abdicate and Warenne appointed to govern Scotland as a province. Having proved his ability Henry Percy was given the task of governing Ayr, Galloway and Cumberland, based at Carlisle Castle. With King Edward now turning his attention to affairs in France there was only a year or so of peace before the situation in Scotland began to unravel. In the summer of 1297 William Wallace murdered the English sheriff of Lanark and was joined by Robert Bruce, Bishop Lockhart, James Stewart and Sir William Douglas in the Scottish Lowlands while Andrew Murray started a Highland uprising.

Working closely with Robert Clifford from Westmorland, Percy confronted the other rebels at Irvine while Wallace was in central Scotland, and negotiated their submission, subduing southern Scotland for a while. Warenne then began an expedition to hunt down Wallace and Murray, finding them waiting north of the River Forth near Stirling Castle. The ensuing Battle of Stirling Bridge was a disaster for the English army. Percy and his fellow commanders could only watch helplessly from the castle as their infantry, caught on the far side of the one narrow bridge were slaughtered. Murray, however, was mortally wounded in the battle and died sometime later. The English were temporarily expelled from Scotland and on the defensive, with the Scots raiding northern England. In the following spring of 1298 King Edward returned from France and assembled a large army, including many Welsh longbow archers, to begin a new and determined assault on Scotland. They caught up with Wallace at Falkirk on 22 July where Henry Percy was part of the fourth reserve division of experienced and highly mobile cavalry.

== Baron and Scottish landowner ==
Early in 1299 the King granted the estates of Ingram Balliol, who had been involved in the Scottish rebellions, to Henry Percy, including land in England and south west Scotland. This not only gave him greater income and status, but also a vested interest in the continuing conquest of Scotland. The king also summoned Percy to attend parliament as a peer of the realm, making him a baron by writ. His family had previously had the courtesy title of baron because of their land holdings. Percy had proved himself an able soldier and administrator and found royal favour. The rest of the year was spent skirmishing with Scottish guerilla groups, and the following summer campaigning with the king although little was achieved other than the capture of Caerlaverock Castle after a long siege, at which he was present with his elderly grandfather Earl Warenne. The Caerlaverock Poem or Roll of Arms made at the siege by the heralds records the armorials of Warenne and Percy in a single verse, translated from Norman French into modern English thus:

Arms of Warenne: Chequy or and azure

"John the good Earl of Warenne
Of the other squadron held the reins
To regulate and govern,
As he who well knew how to lead,
Noble and honourable men.
His banner with gold and azure
Was nobly chequered.
And he had in his company
Henry de Percy, his nephew (son nevou) (sic)
Who seemed to have made a vow
To rout the Scots.
A blue lion rampant on yellow
Was his banner very conspicuous"

Correspondence in late 1301 shows Percy at his estate at Leconfield in Yorkshire, where his wife probably lived, at a safe distance from Scottish raiding parties. In February 1303 Percy was sent north in a cavalry force led by Johannes de Seagrave which was defeated at Roslin. He then joined King Edward's summer offensive, reaching Dunfermline in early November. Robert Bruce had already changed sides to support Edward and in February 1304 most of the Scots negotiated a settlement with the English king. Henry Percy is known to have played a prominent role in the negotiations. Only Stirling Castle now remained to be subdued, and was battered by catapults during the spring of 1304, while King Edward's militant queen, Marguerite of France, watched from a specially built wooden shelter.

The siege culminated in the commissioning of Warwolf, a giant trebuchet which flattened the curtain walls. The defenders had tried to surrender four days earlier, but had been made to wait by the king while he tried out his new toy. In September 1305 the first joint English and Scottish parliament met at Westminster to agree a constitution for the unified state, with Percy playing a leading role in the negotiations, but Robert Bruce, a leading representative of the Scots, was already conspiring to rebel. On 25 March 1306 Robert Bruce was crowned King of Scotland at Scone Abbey, upon which Edward confiscated his lands and gave them to Henry Percy. The king now appointed Percy to command northwest England and southwest Scotland, with orders to suppress the rebellion without mercy. Bruce's army was soon defeated in battle, but Bruce escaped to wage a guerilla campaign against the English from the wild countryside of Galloway. For several years afterwards the English Barons held the castles of southern and central Scotland, but were ambushed and harried in the countryside.

== A new monarch ==
Edward I, on his way to launch a new campaign against the Scots, died on 7 July 1307 before crossing the border. The dying Edward I, asked his assembled barons to give the succession to his only surviving son Edward II. He also asked them to maintain the banishment Piers Gaveston from England. Henry Percy was not present, being left in charge of southern Scotland. The death of Edward I, with the conquest of Scotland incomplete, was a personal disaster for Percy. After years of hard fighting he now had extensive land holdings in southern Scotland, but this was of less interest to Edward II who promptly recalled Gaveston and made him Earl of Cornwall, an office of great wealth. Gaveston, a formidable tournament fighter in the melee, openly despised and insulted the old king's stalwart warriors.

Edward II left Scotland in August 1307 after replacing his father's loyal and experienced commanders, Clifford, Valence and Percy who were sent home, only to be recalled to Scotland in October. By then, however, Robert Bruce had escaped from Galloway to the Highlands, and had raised new forces and taken eastern Scotland by the end of the year. In August 1308 Bruce captured Argyll, previously loyal to King Edward and then raided Northumberland. Percy and Clifford were again summoned to defend Galloway, at their own expense, against an onslaught by Robert Bruce's surviving brother Edward. They were able to hold the castles, but not the countryside. Percy had travelled south to Westminster in February that year for the king's coronation, where he would have seen Gaveston's arrogance.

The ceremony was delayed for a week while the French delegation, alarmed that the king preferred Gaveston's company to that of Isabella, his twelve-year-old French bride, threatened to boycott the coronation. In the event Gaveston was given precedence over the other Earls. At the following feast Gaveston dressed in an outfit of royal purple and pearls, and called the king over to sit with him, instead of with Queen Isabella. The French delegation walked out and one earl drew his sword and had to be restrained from attacking Gaveston. During the spring of 1308 the barons in parliament pressed the king to exile Gaveston, developing the Doctrine of Capacities, distinguishing between loyalty to the king and loyalty to the crown. On 16 June 1308, Gaveston was appointed Lieutenant of Ireland, to get him out of the country, with Henry de Percy as a witness.

== Founding a dynasty in Northumberland ==
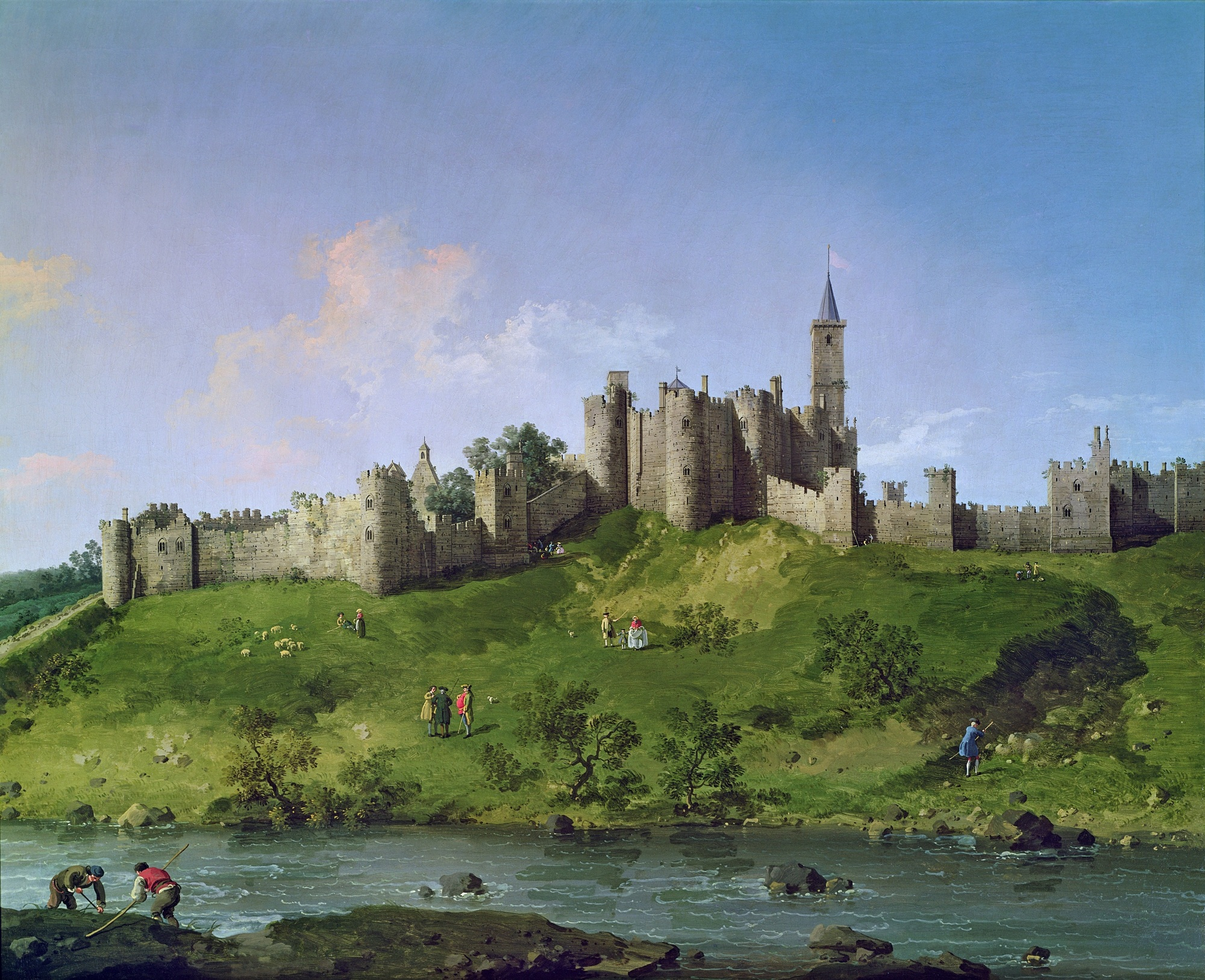
Alnwick Castle by Canaletto

In 1309, Henry was able to buy Alnwick Castle from Anthony Bek, the Prince Bishop of Durham, giving him a base near to the action in Scotland and a substantial annual income of about £475 from the associated lands. To make the purchase price of £4666 he borrowed £2666 from Italian merchant bankers, the Lombard Society. When William Vesci had died in 1297 without a legitimate heir, Bek had been entrusted with the estates of the Vesci family on behalf of his son, the illegitimate William Vesci of Kildare. Vesci of Kildare did receive the other family lands in Yorkshire and Lincolnshire and it is unclear whether he was defrauded by the greedy bishop over the sale of Alnwick. In the same year of 1297 Henry obtained a royal licence to fortify his mansion at Petworth and two mansions in Yorkshire.

== The return of Gaveston ==
By the summer of 1309 Edward II had managed to cajole most of his earls into allowing Piers Gaveston to return to England, although the most powerful earl, Lancaster, was implacably opposed. On 27 June 1309 Gaveston, restored to the Earldom of Cornwall, returned to England and soon proved as obnoxious as before, calling Lancaster "Churl" and Warwick "Black Cur". Henry Percy would have been preoccupied with the purchase of Alnwick at that time and generally tried to stay out of the trouble with Gaveston.

At the parliament of February and March 1310 the king was forced to accept the election of twenty one Lords Ordainers to govern the country. In June the king began a campaign in Scotland in which Percy fought, although many barons senior to Percy declined to take part. Robert Bruce continued to fight a guerilla war, refusing to give battle, so little was achieved, while relations between the king and his earls further deteriorated. In May 1311 Gaveston ordered Percy to hold Perth for the summer with two hundred knights and no infantry, a dangerous task at a time when the king's army was withdrawing to England. Surviving this Percy was back in London in October.

The barons now forced the king to send Gaveston into exile in Flanders, but he was soon recalled and was in York with his heavily pregnant wife in January 1312, with his lands restored. Percy was ordered out of Scarborough Castle and Gaveston took it over. Violence was now inevitable. In April the king and Gaveston were chased out of Newcastle by the sudden arrival of an army under Lancaster, Percy and Clifford, fleeing to Scarborough. In their haste they left behind Gaveston's wife and baby daughter and a great hoard of treasure, which it took Lancaster, Percy and Clifford four days to catalogue. Lancaster held onto this for future bargaining with the king. Gaveston was soon besieged at Scarborough Castle by Percy, Clifford, and the earls of Warenne and Pembroke, surrendering after a month. Percy remained in York when Gaveston was taken south to Warwick and then executed.

== Imprisonment ==
The king, seeking revenge for the death of his favourite, stopped short of civil war with the rebel earls but made an example of the less powerful Baron Percy by confiscating his lands on 28 July 1312, and having him imprisoned by the Sheriff of Yorkshire. The earls made Percy's release a priority in their difficult negotiations with the king and he was freed in January 1313. and was formally pardoned in October. Gaveston's treasure was returned to the king soon after.

== The final year ==
King Edward now prepared for a campaign in Scotland in 1314, culminating in his total defeat at the Battle of Bannockburn. Percy, along with five of the earls and many other nobles, refused summonses to this campaign because it had not been sanctioned by parliament, as required by the Ordinances. There are no contemporary records of Percy being at Bannockburn and it seems that he remained at Alnwick, defending his land against Scottish raiders. His friend and comrade Robert Clifford did go, and was killed in the battle. Within days of the battle Percy was summoned to Newcastle to prepare an emergency defence of northern England against an invasion. Instead of an all-out invasion, Robert Bruce sent raiding parties to extort money from the northern counties. Only a few months later in the first half of October 1314 Henry Percy died, aged 41, of unknown causes.

Peerage of England
New creation	Baron Percy; 1299–1314	Succeeded by Alan de Percy
