= Isabel le Despenser, Countess of Arundel =

Countess of Arundel

Isabel le Despenser
- Countess of Arundel; Countess of Surrey
- Born: c. 1312
- Died: living 1356, and died by 1374/5
- Spouse: Richard FitzAlan, 10th Earl of Arundel (m. 1321; ann. 1344)
- Issue: Sir Edmund FitzAlan, Knt.
- Father: Hugh le Despenser the Younger
- Mother: Eleanor de Clare

Isabel le Despenser (born c. 1312 – living 1356, and died by 1374/5) was an English noblewoman who was married as a child to Richard FitzAlan, 10th Earl of Arundel. The marriage ended in annulment. Her father is famous for being the favourite of Edward II; he was executed as a result of his position and actions. Through her mother, Isabel was a great granddaughter of King Edward I of England.

== Early life ==
Isabel was born c. 1312. She was the eldest daughter of Hugh le Despenser, 2nd Baron le Despenser and Eleanor de Clare, suo jure 6th Lady of Glamorgan. Her mother was the eldest daughter of Joan of Acre, Princess of England, making Isabel a great-granddaughter of King Edward I by his first consort, Eleanor of Castile. She was named after her paternal grandmother, Isabella de Beauchamp, Baroness Despenser.

Isabel's betrothal was contracted to cement an alliance between her father and Edmund FitzAlan, 2nd Earl of Arundel, a loyal supported the King since the 1320s. It must have seemed to be politically prudent to Edmund to marry his heir Richard to the eldest daughter of the King's closest friend and adviser, Hugh le Despenser. For Hugh's part, a large incentive for him must have been that he could expect his daughter Isabel would one day become Countess of Arundel.

== Marriage ==
On 9 February 1321 at the royal manor Havering-atte-Bower, Middlesex, Isabel married Richard FitzAlan, heir to the earldom of Arundel. Isabel was only eight at the time, while Richard was seven. Their respective ages would come up later when Richard would try to seek an annulment.

After their father was executed for treason on 24 November 1326, Isabel and her youngest sister Elizabeth were the only daughters of Hugh the Younger to escape being confined in nunneries; Isabel because she was already married and Elizabeth because of her youth. Elizabeth married Maurice de Berkeley, 4th Baron Berkeley, who was ironically a grandson of Roger Mortimer, 1st Earl of March, the man largely responsible for the execution of Isabel and Elizabeth's father Hugh.

In 1331 Isabel's husband became Earl of Arundel.

== Annulment ==
On 4 December 1344, Richard FitzAlan petitioned the pope for an annulment of his marriage to Isabel. King Edward III supported the petition, which was on the grounds that they had never freely consented to marry, that they both had renounced their vows at puberty, but they had been "forced by blows to cohabit, so that a son was born". The annulment was granted by Pope Clement VI.

After the annulment, Isabel retired to five manors in Essex that were given to her by her ex-husband. Richard, following receiving a papal dispensation, married Isabel's first cousin Eleanor of Lancaster, with whom he had apparently been having an affair. Richard and Eleanor had five children who survived into adulthood.

== Issue ==
Richard and Isabel had one son, Edmund FitzAlan, born about 1327 or 1329; Martyn John Lawrence claims that he had two sisters called Phillipa and Isabel, while a study also adds one more daughter to them named Laura/Lora, who had an illegitimate daughter by Fernando Afonso de Albuquerque. Richard and Isabel's son Edmund was the heir to the earldom of Arundel until he was declared illegitimate by the annulment of his parents' marriage.

== Ancestry ==
Ancestors of Isabel le Despenser, Countess of Arundel

16. Hugh le Despenser
8. Hugh le Despencer, 1st Baron le Despencer
17. Mary de Quincy
4. Hugh le Despenser, 1st Earl of Winchester
18. Philip Basset
9. Aline Bassett
19. Hawise de Gray
2. Hugh Despenser the Younger
20. William de Beauchamp
10. William de Beauchamp, 9th Earl of Warwick
21. Isabel de Mauduit
5. Isabella de Beauchamp
22. John Fitzgeoffrey
11. Maud FitzJohn
23. Isabel Bigod
1. Isabel le Despenser
24. Gilbert de Clare, 4th Earl of Hertford
12. Richard de Clare, 5th Earl of Hertford
25. Isabel Marshal
6. Gilbert de Clare, 6th Earl of Hertford
26. John de Lacy, 1st Earl of Lincoln
13. Maud de Lacy
27. Margaret de Quincy, Countess of Lincoln
3. Eleanor de Clare
28. Henry III of England
14. Edward I of England
29. Eleanor of Provence
7. Joan of Acre
30. Ferdinand III of Castile
15. Eleanor of Castile
31. Joan, Countess of Ponthieu
