= Eleanor of Lancaster =

English noblewoman (1318–1372)

- Lady Beaumont; Countess of Arundel
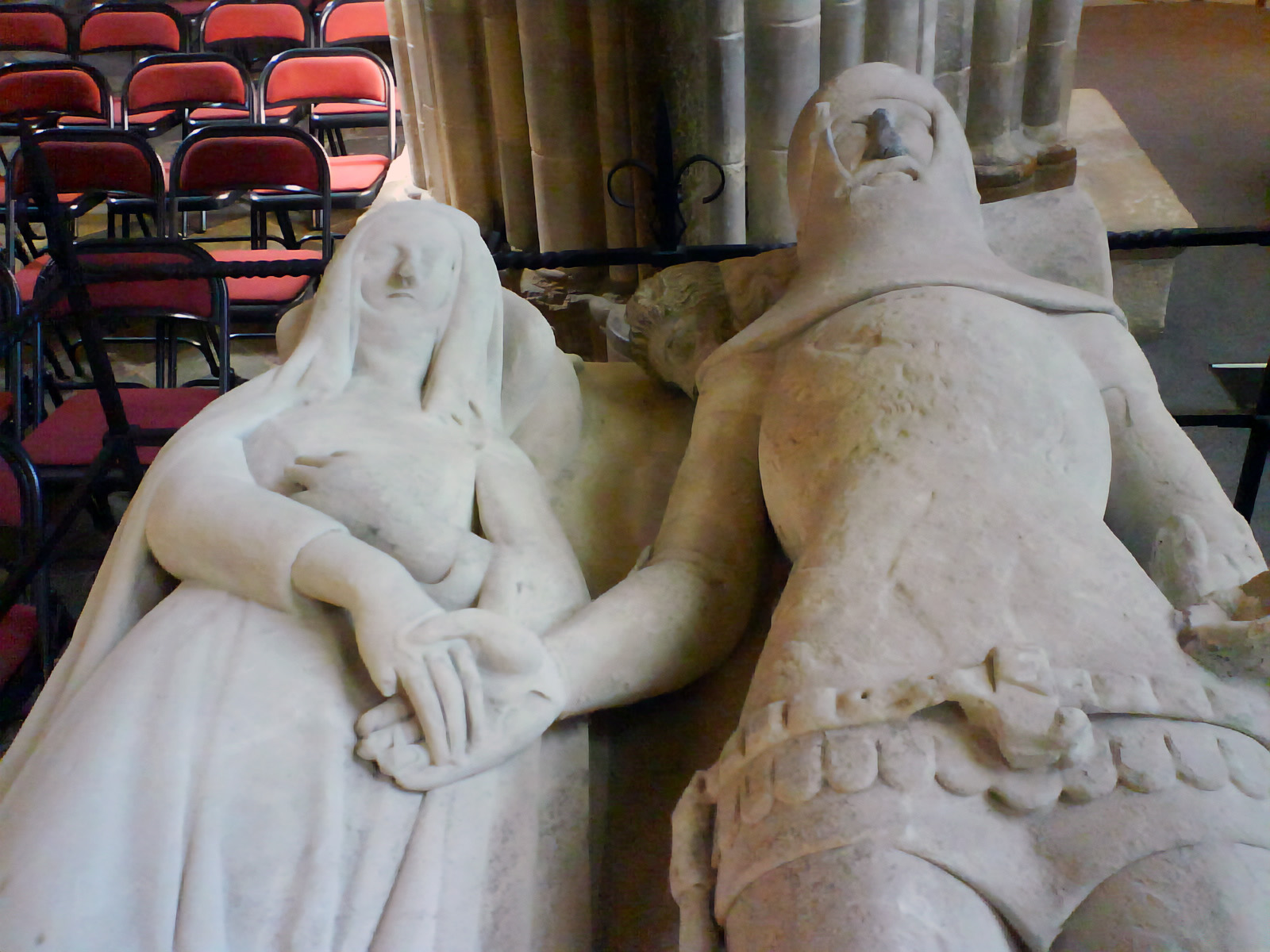
- The memorial effigy of Eleanor and Richard Fitzalan in Chichester Cathedral
- Born: 11 September 1318
- Died: 11 January 1372 (aged 53); Arundel, West Sussex
- Buried: Lewes Priory, Lewes, West Sussex
- Noble family: Lancaster
- Spouses: John de Beaumont, 2nd Baron Beaumont (m. 1330; died 1342) Richard Fitzalan, 3rd Earl of Arundel (m. 1344)
- Issue: Henry Beaumont, 3rd Baron Beaumont; Richard Fitzalan, 4th Earl of Arundel; John FitzAlan, 1st Baron Arundel; Thomas Arundel, Archbishop of Canterbury; Joan Fitzalan, Countess of Hereford; Alice Fitzalan, Countess of Kent; Mary Fitzalan, Lady Strange of Blackmere; Eleanor Fitzalan
- Father: Henry, 3rd Earl of Lancaster
- Mother: Maud Chaworth

Eleanor of Lancaster, Countess of Arundel (sometimes called Eleanor Plantagenet; 11 September 1318 – 11 January 1372) was the fifth daughter of Henry, 3rd Earl of Lancaster and Maud Chaworth.

== First marriage and issue ==
Eleanor married, first, on 6 November 1330 John de Beaumont, 2nd Baron Beaumont (d. 1342). He was the son of Henry Beaumont, 4th Earl of Buchan, 1st Baron Beaumont (c. 1288 – 1340) by his wife Alice Comyn (1289 – 3 July 1349). John died in a tournament on 14 April 1342. They had one son, born to Eleanor in Ghent whilst serving as lady-in-waiting to Queen Philippa of Hainault:

- Henry Beaumont, 3rd Baron Beaumont (4 April 1340 – 25 July 1369), the first husband of Lady Margaret de Vere (d. 15 June 1398), the daughter of John de Vere, 7th Earl of Oxford by his wife Maud de Badlesmere. Henry and Margaret had one son, John Beaumont, 4th Baron Beaumont KG (1361–1396).

In 1341, Eleanor was granted £100 yearly for life by the Exchequer, in recognition of her service to Queen Philippa. In 1344 she went on pilgrimage to Santiago de Compostela, nominating attorneys in England to manage her estates.

== Second marriage ==
On 5 February 1345 at Ditton Church, Stoke Poges, Buckinghamshire, she married Richard Fitzalan, 3rd Earl of Arundel. The wedding was attended by King Edward III. Richard's previous marriage, to Isabel le Despenser, daughter of Hugh le Despenser, had taken place when they were children. It was annulled by papal mandate as she, since her father's attainder and execution, had ceased to be of any importance to him. Pope Clement VI obligingly annulled the marriage, bastardized their son Edmund FitzAlan, and provided a dispensation for FitzAlan's second marriage to Eleanor, with whom he had been living in adultery. The dispensation, dated 4 March 1345, was required because his first and second wives were first cousins.

The children of Eleanor's second marriage were:

1. Richard Fitzalan (1346–1397), who succeeded as 4th Earl of Arundel. He married firstly Elizabeth de Bohun, by whom he had issue, and secondly Philippa Mortimer, and they had no children.
2. John Fitzalan (bef. 1349 – 1379), married Eleanor Maltravers, by whom he had issue.
3. Thomas Arundel, Archbishop of Canterbury (c. 1353 – 19 February 1413).
4. Lady Joan Fitzalan (1347/1348 – 7 April 1419), married Humphrey de Bohun, 7th Earl of Hereford, by whom she had issue.
5. Lady Alice Fitzalan (1350 – 17 March 1416), married Thomas Holland, 2nd Earl of Kent by whom she had issue.
6. Lady Mary FitzAlan (died 29 August 1396), married John Le Strange, 4th Lord Strange of Blackmere, by whom she had issue.
7. Lady Eleanor FitzAlan (1348 – 29 August 1396) married Sir Anthony Browne.

== Later life ==
Eleanor died at Arundel in Jan 1371/2 and was buried at Lewes Priory in Lewes, East Sussex, England.

Her husband survived her by four years, and was buried beside her; in his will Richard requests to be buried "near to the tomb of Eleanor de Lancaster, my wife; and I desire that my tomb be no higher than hers, that no men at arms, horses, hearse, or other pomp, be used at my funeral, but only five torches...as was about the corpse of my wife, be allowed."

The memorial effigies raised to Eleanor and her husband Richard Fitzalan, 10th Earl of Arundel, now in Chichester Cathedral, are the subject of the celebrated Philip Larkin poem "An Arundel Tomb."

== Ancestry ==
Ancestors of Eleanor of Lancaster

8. Henry III of England
4. Edmund Crouchback, 1st Earl of Lancaster
9. Eleanor of Provence
2. Henry, 3rd Earl of Lancaster
10. Robert I, Count of Artois
5. Blanche of Artois
11. Matilda of Brabant
1. Eleanor of Lancaster
12. Sir Patrick Chaworth
6. Sir Patrick Chaworth
13. Hawise de Londres
3. Maud Chaworth
14. William Beauchamp, 9th Earl of Warwick
7. Isabella Beauchamp
15. Maud FitzJohn

== Sources ==
- Fowler, Kenneth. The King's Lieutenant, 1969
- Nicolas, Nicholas Harris. Testamenta Vetusta, 1826.
- Weis, Frederick Lewis. Ancestral Roots of Certain American Colonists Who Came to America Before 1700, Lines: 17–30, 21–30, 28–33, 97–33, 114–31
