= John Fitzalan (1246–1272) =

English baron

John FitzAlan
- Born: 14 September 1246
- Died: 18 March 1272 (aged 25)
- Noble family: FitzAlan
- Spouse: Isabella Mortimer
- Issue: 3, including Richard FitzAlan, Earl of Arundel
- Father: John Fitzalan II, Earl of Arundel
- Mother: Maud de Verdun

John III FitzAlan (14 September 1246 – 18 March 1272), was an English nobleman. He was also Lord and Baron of Clun and Oswestry in the Welsh Marches.

== Family ==
He was the son of John II FitzAlan, Earl of Arundel (1223–1267), and Maud de Verdun, daughter of Theobald le Botiller (or Boteler) and Rohese (or Rohesia) de Verdun. His paternal grandparents were John FitzAlan, Lord of Oswestry and Isabel d'Aubigny.

== Marriage ==
Lord FitzAlan married Isabella Mortimer (died 1292), daughter of Roger Mortimer, 1st Baron Mortimer and Maud de Braose in 1260. They had one son:

- Richard FitzAlan, 1st Earl of Arundel.

They had at least one daughter:

- Matilda (Maud) FitzAlan married firstly, Philip Burnell (died 1294); married secondly, Robert de Brus, Lord of Annandale and Earl of Carrick; married thirdly, Simon de Cricketot.

Preceded by John FitzAlan II	John III FitzAlan, 7th Earl of Arundel, Lord of Clun; 1267–1272	Succeeded by Richard FitzAlan
