= Isabella Mortimer, lady of Clun and Oswestry =

Marcher noblewoman

Isabella Mortimer
- Lady of Clun and Oswestry
- Born: After 1247; Wigmore Castle, Herefordshire
- Died: Before 1 April 1292
- Noble family: Mortimer
- Spouses: John Fitzalan; Robert de Hastang
- Issue: Richard Fitzalan, 1st Earl of Arundel; Maud Fitzalan, Lady Burnell
- Father: Roger Mortimer, 1st Baron Mortimer
- Mother: Maud de Braose

Isabella Mortimer, Lady of Clun and Oswestry (after 1247 – before 1 April 1292) was a noblewoman and a member of an important and powerful Welsh Marcher family. Although often overshadowed in modern historiography by her better-known parents, she is now known to have played an important part in her family's struggles against Llywelyn ap Gruffudd and to have helped to secure the frontline at Shropshire in the run-up to English conquest of Wales. She was the wife and widow of John III FitzAlan, baron of Clun and Oswestry and de jure earl of Arundel. After a lengthy widowhood, she married for a second time (to Robert, Knight de Hastang, b. Staffordshire to Sir Robert de Hastang & Joane de Curli) and largely disappeared from the records.

== Family ==
Isabella was born some time after 1247, possibly at Wigmore Castle, Herefordshire, the daughter of Roger Mortimer, 1st Baron Mortimer and Maud de Braose. Her father was a celebrated soldier and Marcher baron; and her mother was a staunch royalist during the Second Barons' War who devised the plan for the escape of Prince Edward, the future King Edward I of England, from the custody of Simon de Montfort, 6th Earl of Leicester. She had one sister and five brothers, including Ralph, would-be heir to the family estates, who predeceased his parents, and Edmund Mortimer, 2nd Baron Mortimer.

== Marriages and issue ==
Before 14 May 1260, Isabella married her first husband, John III FitzAlan, the son and heir of John II FitzAlan, baron of Clun and Oswestry and de jure earl of Arundel, and Maud de Verdun. In due course John the younger would succeed to the baronies of Clun and Oswestry, but as long as the dowager countess of Arundel remained alive the FitzAlans did not possess the complete earldom or its title. Consequently, Isabella Mortimer never held the title of countess of Arundel, which remained until 1282 with Isabella de Warenne, the childless widow of Hugh d'Aubigny (d.1243).

Together Isabella Mortimer and John III FitzAlan had at least two children:

- Richard Fitzalan, Earl of Arundel (3 February 1267 – 9 March 1302), married Alice of Saluzzo, by whom he had issue.
- Maud Fitzalan (died after October 1298), married Sir Philip Burnell of Condover, Holgate, Acton Burnell, and Little Rissington, by whom she had issue.

Isabella's husband died, aged around 25, in the spring of 1272, leaving underage children. The couple's son Richard FitzAlan was a boy of about five at the time of his father's death and was committed to the wardship of his maternal grandfather, Roger Mortimer of Wigmore. Serious errors in our nineteenth-century sources have led to the enduring misconception that Isabella Mortimer married Ralph d' Ardern soon after the death of John FitzAlan and had three husbands in all. In fact, she remained a widow for over twelve years and was a prominent and active contributor to Marcher society during that time.

On 2 September 1285, in a private ceremony at Poling, Sussex, she married, as his second wife, Robert de Hastang. She was initially heavily penalized for having married without royal licence, before it was discovered that her late father had purchased her marriage rights many years earlier from King Henry III, and that she and her new husband had absolved themselves of any wrongdoing under the terms of this agreement, by paying a fine to the executors of father's will. She does not appear to have had any children from her second marriage.

== Widowhood and the Welsh Frontier ==
It was during her protracted widowhood that Isabella Mortimer's contributions to Marcher society and Anglo-Welsh relations became clear. With dower and other rights, including royal appointments, in several border strongholds, she developed something of a working partnership alongside her father. Together they were responsible for the security of much of the frontier from the lower edge of Cheshire to southern Herefordshire. Among other things, Isabella was charged with victualing Oswestry Castle for the incoming garrison at the start of the Anglo-Welsh war of 1282 and, several years earlier, with overseeing much needed repairs to the same castle.

In late 1282, as a second war with Llywelyn ap Gruffudd got under way, Isabella was replaced by her younger brother Edmund in most of her custodial interests, including the frontier fortresses. Although their father was as yet still alive, Edmund was now emerging as the new head of the Mortimer family of Wigmore and the natural leader of the family's war effort.

Isabella died before 1 April 1292, on which date her husband was released by the Crown from paying outstanding sums relating to her own economic activities. She is buried with her son in the church at Haughmond Abbey.
