= Fernando Afonso de Albuquerque =

Portuguese nobleman

- Lord
- Born: 1327; Kingdom of Portugal
- Died: 1387 (aged 59–60); Kingdom of Portugal
- Noble family: House of Burgundy
- Father: João Afonso de Albuquerque, 6th Lord of Albuquerque
- Mother: Maria Rodrigues Barba

Fernando Afonso de Albuquerque (1327-1387) was a Portuguese nobleman, alcaide da guarda, and ambassador to England.

== Biography ==
Born in Portugal. Fernando was the son of João Afonso de Albuquerque, 6th Lord of Albuquerque and Maria Rodrigues Barba. His grandparents were Afonso Sanches and Teresa Martínez de Meneses. Fernando Alonso was never married, but had several children with a lady born in England named Lady Laura FitzAlan daughter of the 2nd count of Arundel. Her daughter Joana Albuquerque, was member of the court of Philippa of Lancaster.
