= Richard Fitzalan, 1st Earl of Arundel =

English nobleman and soldier

Richard FitzAlan
- Born: 3 February 1267
- Died: 9 March 1302 (aged 35)
- Buried: Haughmond Abbey, Shropshire
- Noble family: FitzAlan
- Spouse: Alice of Saluzzo
- Issue: Edmund FitzAlan; John FitzAlan; Alice FitzAlan; Margaret FitzAlan; Eleanor FitzAlan
- Father: John FitzAlan III
- Mother: Isabella Mortimer

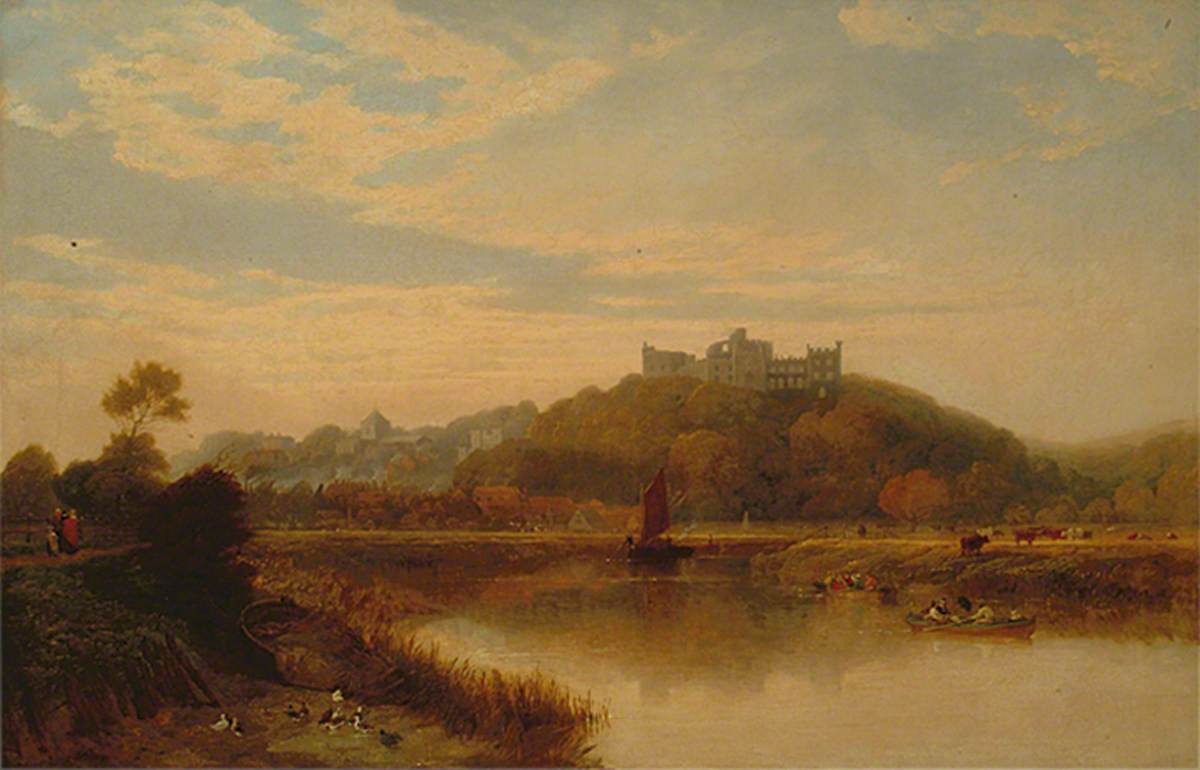
Arundel Castle, seat of the Earl of Arundel

Richard FitzAlan, 1st Earl of Arundel (Note: The Earls of Arundel have been numbered differently depending on whether the claims of the first seven to have been Earls by tenancy are accepted. Richard FitzAlan was the first member of the FitzAlan family to be definitely styled Earl of Arundel. He is therefore counted variously as the 1st, 6th or 8th Earl.) (3 February 1267 – 9 March 1302) was an English nobleman and soldier who fought in the Welsh wars of 1288 to 1294.

== Lineage ==
Arms of d'Aubigny, Earls of Arundel, as blazoned in Charles's Roll of Arms (13th century), for Hugh d'Aubigny, 5th Earl of Arundel (d.1243): Gules, a lion rampant or. These arms were adopted by the family of Fitzalan, successors in the Earldom of Arundel; They were recorded as the arms of Richard FitzAlan, 8th Earl of Arundel (1266–1302) in the Falkirk Roll, Glover's Roll and in the Caerlaverock Poem (1300) and are shown on his seal on the Barons' Letter, 1301. They are today shown in the 4th quarter of the arms of the Duke of Norfolk, of the family of Fitz-Alan Howard, who holds the subsidiary title Earl of Arundel

He was the son of John Fitzalan III and Isabella Mortimer, daughter of Roger Mortimer, 1st Baron Wigmore and Maud de Braose. His paternal grandparents were John Fitzalan II and Maud le Botiller. Their family seat was Arundel Castle.

Richard was feudal Lord of Clun and Oswestry in the Welsh Marches. In 1289 he was created Earl of Arundel.

He was knighted by King Edward I of England in 1289.

== Fighting in Wales, Gascony and Scotland ==
He fought in the Welsh wars, 1288 to 1294, when the Welsh castle of Castell y Bere (near modern-day Towyn) was besieged by Madog ap Llywelyn. He commanded the force sent to relieve the siege and he also took part in many other campaigns in Wales; also in Gascony in 1295-97; and furthermore in the Scottish wars of 1298-1300.

== Marriage and children ==
He married sometime before 1285, Alice of Saluzzo (also known as Alesia di Saluzzo), daughter of Thomas I of Saluzzo in Italy. Their issue:

1. Edmund Fitzalan, 2nd Earl of Arundel.
2. John, a priest.
3. Alice Fitzalan, married Stephen de Segrave, 3rd Lord Segrave.
4. Margaret Fitzalan, married William le Botiller (or Butler), great-grandson of the Welsh prince Gruffydd II ap Madog, Lord of Dinas Bran Castle.
5. Eleanor FitzAlan, married Henry de Percy, 1st Baron Percy. (Note: Standard accounts of the Percy family identify Eleanor as the daughter of the "Earl of Arundel". Arrangements for Eleanor's marriage to Lord Percy are found in the recognizance made in 1300 by Eleanor's father, Richard, Earl of Arundel, for a debt of 2,000 marks which he owed Sir Henry Percy. Eleanor was styled as a "kinswoman" of Edward II; once in 1318 and again in 1322 presumably by her descent from Amadeus IV, Count of Savoy who was the brother of Edward II's great-grandmother, Beatrice of Savoy. Eleanor's brothers, Edmund and John were also styled as "kinsmen" of the king. Eleanor's identity is further indicated by the presence of the old and new arms of FitzAlan (or Arundel) at her tomb.)

== Burial ==
Richard and his mother are buried together in the sanctuary of Haughmond Abbey, long closely associated with the FitzAlan family.

== Sources ==
- Cokayne, G.E. & Gibbs, Vicary, eds. (1910). "Arundel". The Complete Peerage. Vol. 1 (2nd ed.). London: St. Catherine Press.
- Coke, Karen (2016). "Lambert Barnard, Bishop Shirborn's 'Paynter'". In Dimmock, Matthew; Hadfield, Andrew; Quinn, Paul (eds.). Art, Literature and Religion in Early Modern Sussex. Routledge.
- Fryde, E. B. (1961). Handbook of British Chronology (Second ed.). London: Royal Historical Society.
- Tout, Thomas Frederick (1889). "Fitzalan, Richard I, Earl of Arundel (1267–1302)" . In Stephen, Leslie (ed.). Dictionary of National Biography. Vol. 19. London: Smith, Elder & Co. pp. 95–96.
- Tout, T.F. & Saul, Nigel (2004). "Fitzalan, Richard, first earl of Arundel (1267–1302), magnate and soldier". In Saul, Nigel (ed.). Oxford Dictionary of National Biography (online) (online ed.). Oxford University Press. doi:10.1093/ref:odnb/9533. (Subscription, Wikipedia Library access or UK public library membership required.)
- Weis, Frederick Lewis. Ancestral Roots of Certain American Colonists Who Came to America Before 1700.

Peerage of England
Vacant Title last held by Hugh d'Aubigny	Earl of Arundel; 1289–1302	Succeeded by Edmund Fitzalan
