= Clan Stewart =

Scottish clan

- Stiùbhart
- Crest: Due to a lack of a chief, members sometimes use the badge belonging to the Earl of Galloway: A pelican Argent, winged Or, in her nest feeding her young, Proper.
- Motto: Virescit vulnere virtus (Courage grows strong at a wound)

Profile
- Region: Lowlands and Highlands
- District: Renfrewshire, Teviotdale and Lauderdale.
- Plant badge: Thistle
- Pipe music: Bratach Bhàn nan Stiùbhartach (The white banner of the Stewarts)
- Clan Stewart no longer has a chief, and is an armigerous clan
- Commander: The Earl of Galloway is considered to be the senior cadet, but is not chief.
Septs of Clan Stewart
Stewart: Boyd, Denniston, France, Francis, Lennox, Lisle, Lombard, Lyday, Lyle, Mentieth, Moodie, Stuart, Young.
Stewart of Atholl: Conacher, Crookshank(s), Cruickshank(s), Duilach, Garrow, Gray, Larnach, MacGarrow, MacGlashan
Stewart of Appin: Carmichael, Clay, Combich, Combie, Conlay, Donlevy, Leay, Levac, Livingston(e), Lorne, MacColl, MacCombe, McCombich, MacDonLeavy, MacLeay, MacLew, MacMichael, MacNairn, MacNucator, MacRob, Mitchell, Mitchelson, Robb, Walker
Stuart of Bute: Bannatyne, Caw, Fullerton, Glass, Hunter, Jamieson/Jamison/Jameson/Jimerson, Lewis, Loy, MacCamie, MacCaw, MacCloy, MacKirdie/McCurdie/McCurdy/McKirdie/McKirdy, MacElheran, MacKerron, MacLewis, MacLoy, MacMunn, MacMurtrie, MacCook, Malloy, Milloy, Munn, Neilson, Sharpe, Sharp
Stewart of Galloway: Carmichael, MacMichael
Clan branches
House of Stuart (historic chiefs)
Stewart of Galloway (senior line)
Stewart of Appin
Stewart of Atholl
Stuart of Bute
Stewart of Balquhidder
Stuart of Moray
Stewart of Darnley
See also:
Stewart Baronets
Steuart Baronets
Stuart Baronets
Allied clans
Clan Boyd
Clan Cameron
Clan Erskine
Clan Graham
Clan Lindsay
Clan Donald (17th & 18th centuries)
Clan MacLellan
Clan Mackenzie
Clan Scott
Rival clans
Clan Douglas
Clan Campbell
Clan Donald (15th & 16th centuries)

Clan Stewart (Gaelic: Stiùbhart) is a Scottish Highland and Lowland clan. The clan is recognised by Court of the Lord Lyon; however, it does not have a clan chief recognised by the Lord Lyon King of Arms. Because the clan has no chief it can be considered an armigerous clan; however, the Earls of Galloway are now considered to be the principal branch of this clan, and the crest and motto of The Earls of Galloway's arms are used in the Clan Stewart crest badge. The Court of the Lord Lyon recognises two other Stewart/Stuart clans, Clan Stuart of Bute and Clan Stewart of Appin. Stuart of Bute is the only one of the three clans at present which has a recognised chief.

== History ==
=== Origins of the Clan ===
The Stewarts who became monarchs of Scotland were descended from a family who were seneschals (stewards) of Dol in Brittany, France. After the Norman Conquest of England, the Stewarts acquired estates in England as the FitzAlan family, also Earls of Arundel. Walter Flaad or Walter fitz Alan the steward came to Scotland when David I of Scotland claimed his throne. It is from their office as stewards that the surname Stewart came. Walter was created High Steward of Scotland and was granted large estates in Renfrewshire and East Lothian. Walter was one of the commanders of the royal army which defeated Somerled of the Isles (ancestor of Clan Donald) at the Battle of Renfrew in 1164. (See: Walter fitz Alan).

=== Scottish-Norwegian War ===
Alexander Stewart, 4th High Steward of Scotland, also known as Alexander of Dundonald Castle, commanded the Scottish army at the Battle of Largs in 1263 against Viking invaders.

=== Wars of Scottish Independence ===
During the Wars of Scottish Independence, James Stewart, 5th High Steward of Scotland swore fealty to Edward I of England. However, he later sided with Robert the Bruce and William Wallace in the struggle for Scottish independence.

=== Royal House of Stewart ===
Walter Stewart, 6th High Steward of Scotland married Marjory, daughter of king Robert the Bruce. When Robert's son, David II of Scotland died, he was succeeded by Walter Stewart's son, Robert II of Scotland. King Robert II had many sons; the eldest, John, succeeded to the throne of Scotland as Robert III of Scotland. The royal line of male Stewarts was uninterrupted until the reign of Mary, Queen of Scots. As a family the Stewarts (Stuarts) held the throne of Scotland and later England until the death of Anne, Queen of Great Britain in 1714.

==== Albany Stewarts ====
The Dukedom of Albany is a peerage title that was bestowed on some younger sons in the Scottish and later the British royal family, particularly in the House of Stuart. Robert II's third son was Robert Stewart, 1st Duke of Albany, who was Regent of Scotland during part of the reigns of his father, brother, and nephew James I of Scotland. Robert II's fourth son was Alexander Stewart, Earl of Buchan, who was famed as the Wolf of Badenoch and was responsible for the destruction of Elgin Cathedral.

When James I of Scotland came of age, he curbed the power of his cousins, the Albany Stewarts. He beheaded Murdoch Stewart, 2nd Duke of Albany, eldest son of the former regent Robert Stewart. Two of Murdoch's sons, Walter and Alexander (Alasdair), were both executed as well.

== Main branches of the clan ==
undiffered arms of stewart Stewart of Stewart	Arms of Stuart of Albany Stuart of Albany	Arms of Stuart of Buchan Stuart, Earl of Buchan
Arms of Stewart of Barclye Stewart of Barclye	Arms of Stewart of Garlies Stewart of Garlies	Arms of Stewart of Minto Stewart of Minto
Arms of Stewart of Physgill Stewart of Physgill	Arms of Stewart of Bute Stewart of Bute	Arms of Stuart of Bute Stuart of Bute
Arms of Stewart of Moray Stuart, Earl of Moray	Arms of Stewart of Atholl Stewart of Atholl	Arms of Stewart of Rothesay Stewart of Rothesay
Arms of Stewart of Carrick Stewart, Earl of Carrick	Arms of Stewart of Ross Stewart, Duke of Ross	Arms of Stewart of Strathearn Stewart, Earl of Strathearn
Arms of Stewart of Galloway Stewart, Earl of Galloway	Arms of Stuart of Darnley Stuart of Darnley	Arms of Stuart, Earl of Lennox Stuart of Lennox
Arms of Stewart of Ardvorlich Stewart of Ardvorlich	Arms of Stewart of Avandale Stuart, Lord Avandale	Arms of Stuart, Lord Ochiltree Stuart, Lord Ochiltree

As the Chief of the Stewarts was also the occupant of the throne, the relationship between the various branches or members of the family differed from the usual ties between clansmen and their Chief. The family did however have their own badge and tartan to distinguish them. Apart from the royal house of Stewart, the three main branches of the clan that settled in the Scottish Highlands during the 14th and 15th centuries were the Stewarts of Appin, Stewarts of Atholl and Stewarts of Balquhidder. Today the Earls of Galloway are considered the senior line of the Clan Stewart.

=== Stewarts of Appin ===
The Stewarts of Appin descend from Sir John Stewart of Bonkyll, son of Alexander Stewart, 4th High Steward of Scotland. Sir John's younger son, James Stewart, was killed in 1333 at the Battle of Halidon Hill. His grandson married the heiress of the Lord of Lorne (chief of Clan MacDougall). He was the first Stewart Lord of Lorne. The Stewarts of Appin supported the royalist cause during the Civil War of the 17th century and also supported the deposed Stuart monarchs during the Jacobite rising of 1715 and Jacobite rising of 1745.

=== Stewarts of Atholl ===
The Stewarts of Atholl are descended from a son of Alexander Stewart, Earl of Buchan, the "Wolf of Badenoch". James Stewart built a strong castle at Garth where he settled at the end of the 14th century. Queen Joanna, widow of James I of Scotland married the Black Knight of Lorne who was descended from the fourth High Steward. Their son was John Stewart of Balveny who was granted the Earldom of Atholl by his half-brother, James II of Scotland. He supported his brother, commanding the royal forces that opposed the rebellion by the Lord of the Isles. The fifth Stewart Earl of Atholl died with no male issue and his daughter married William Murray, second Earl of Tullibardine, who succeeded as Earl of Atholl. Many Stewarts continued to live in the Atholl area with many claiming descent from the Wolf of Badenoch. They were mainly transferred by allegiance to the Murray Earls of Atholl and were known as Athollmen. This is maintained today with the Atholl Highlanders, Europe's only legal private army. General David Stewart of Garth, an Athollman, was an officer in the Black Watch regiment and his book, Sketches of the Highlanders and Highland Regiments, popularized his homeland in Victorian England.

James Stewart of Sticks and Ballechin (d. 1523), illegitimate son of James II, King of Scotland, was the ancestor of several other Stewart families in Atholl, including the Stewarts of Arnagang, Ballechin, Innervack, Killichassie, the later Kynachins, Loch of Clunie, and Stewartfield.

=== Stewarts of Balquhidder ===
Stewarts came to Balqhidder in about 1490, when William Stewart, grandson of the only son of the Duke of Albany to escape the persecution of James I, was appointed ballie of the crown lands of Balquhidder.

=== Stuarts of Bute ===
The chiefs of the Clan Stuart of Bute are descended from Sir John Stewart, illegitimate son of Robert Stewart who reigned as Robert II of Scotland by Moira Leitch (according to tradition).

=== Earl Castle Stewart ===
Earl Castle Stewart, in the County Tyrone, is a title in the Peerage of Ireland. It was created in 1800 for Andrew Thomas Stewart, 9th Baron Castle Stuart.

The Earls Castle Stewart claim to be the head representatives in the pure male line of the Scottish Royal House of Stuart. They are directly descended from Sir Walter Stewart (died 1425), Keeper of Dumbarton Castle, younger son of Murdoch Stewart, 2nd Duke of Albany, son of Robert Stewart, 1st Duke of Albany, younger son of King Robert II of Scotland.

=== Stewarts of Moray ===
James Stewart, 2nd Earl of Moray the "Bonnie Earl o' Moray", who married Elizabeth, daughter and heiress of James Stewart, 1st Earl of Moray, (she died on 18 November 1591) whose father was James V of Scotland. Stewart was the eldest son of James Stewart, 1st Lord Doune, of Doune Castle, Perthshire, and Lady Margaret Campbell. He was a male-line descendant of Robert II of Scotland through his second son, the Duke of Albany, whose brother was the Earl of Buchan (the "Wolf of Badenoch". He soon after assumed, jure uxoris, the title of the Earl of Moray.

== Castles ==
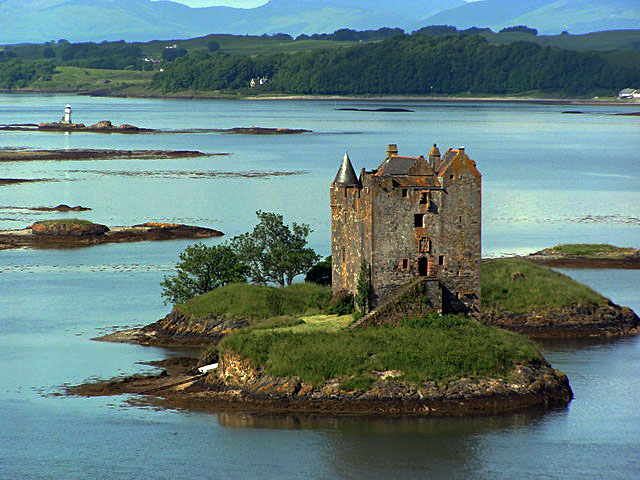
Castle Stalker, a seat of the Stewarts of Appin

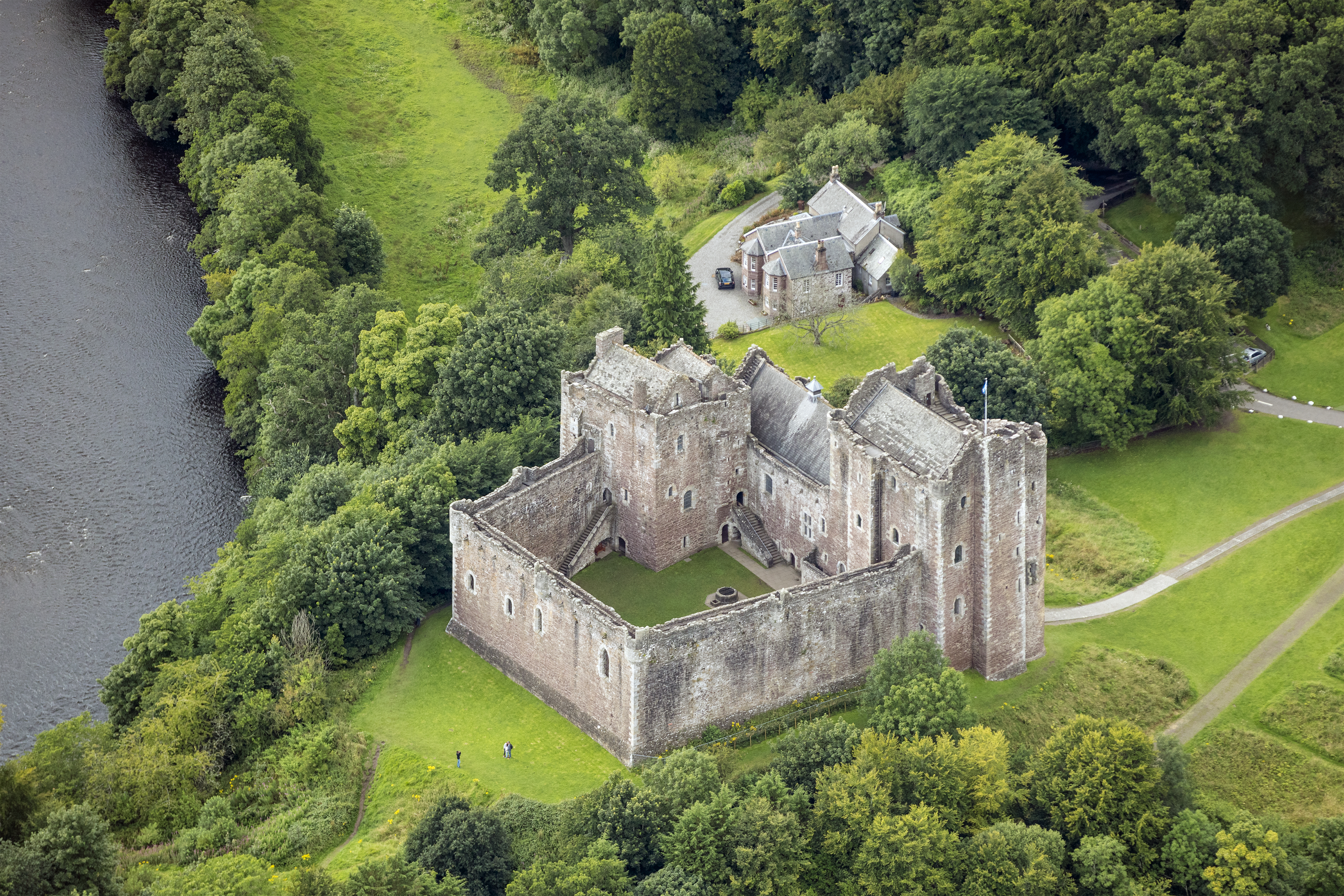
Doune Castle, seat of Robert Stewart, Duke of Albany

- Edinburgh Castle one of the most notable castles owned by the Stewarts as the royal family.
- Stirling Castle one of the most notable castles owned by the Stewarts as the royal family.
- Linlithgow Palace was one of the principal residences of the Stewart and Stuart monarchs of Scotland.
- Falkland Palace was acquired by the Stewart family in the 14th century and was owned by Robert Stewart, Duke of Albany. It was a royal palace of the Scottish kings.
- Castle Stuart was the home of the line of Stuarts who held the title Earl of Moray.
- Castle Stalker was a seat of the Stewarts of Appin.
- Lochranza Castle was granted to Walter Stewart, the Earl of Menteith in 1262 by Alexander III of Scotland.
- Dundonald Castle built in the 13th century by Alexander Stewart, 4th High Steward of Scotland. Used by the Stewart monarchs.
- Craigmillar Castle, Edinburgh, castle of the royal Stuarts.
- Doune Castle built in the 14th century by Robert Stewart, Duke of Albany.
- Earl's Palace, Kirkwall built by Robert Stewart, 1st Earl of Orkney.
- Bishop's Palace, Kirkwall originally a Norwegian fort, ownership later passed to Robert Stewart, 1st Earl of Orkney.
- Scalloway Castle built by Patrick Stewart, 2nd Earl of Orkney.
- Earl's Palace, Birsay built by Patrick Stewart, 2nd Earl of Orkney.
- Crookston Castle has been owned by various branches of the Clan Stewart.
- Rothesay Castle was built by the Stewarts at the beginning of the 13th century.
- Drumin Castle was the home of Alexander Stewart, Earl of Buchan (the Wolf of Badenoch).
- Ardvorlich Castle, stronghold of the Stuarts of Balquhidder
- Garth Castle, stronghold of the Clan Stewart.
- Grandtully Castle, stronghold of the Clan Stewart.
- Garlies Castle, stronghold of the Clan Stewart.
- Castle Campbell, originally called Castle Gloom, it passed by right of marriage to the Campbells who changed the name to Castle Campbell by an Act of Parliament in 1489.

== Tartans ==
The usual tartan for the Stewarts or Stuarts is a red coloured pattern known as the Royal Stewart tartan. According to historian Henry James Lee the effect of a large body of men crossing a hill in the red Stuart tartan, contrasting with the dark coloured heath has been described "as if the hill were on fire".

Tartan image	Notes
	Clan Stewart tartan, as published in 1842 in the dubious Vestiarium Scoticum.

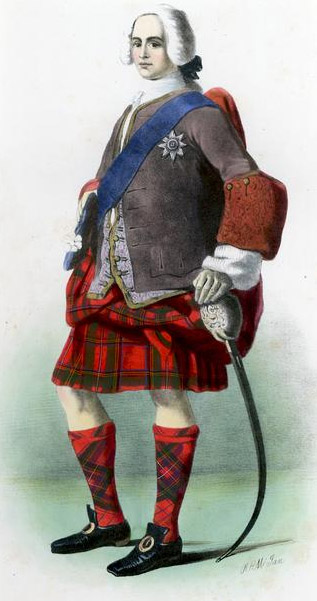
A Victorian era, romanticised depiction of a member of the clan by R. R. McIan, from The Clans of the Scottish Highlands, published in 1845.

== See also ==
- Armorial of the House of Stuart
- Scottish clan
- Armigerous clan
- High Steward of Scotland
- House of Stuart
- Marquess of Bute Crichton-Stuart of Bute
- Earl of Galloway Stewart of Galloway
- Earl of Moray Stuart of Moray
- Earl of Traquair Stewart of Traquair
- Earl of Wharncliffe
- Earl Castle Stewart Stewart in County Tyrone
- Viscount Stuart of Findhorn
- Lord Ochiltree
- Lord Avondale
- Lord Methven
- Lord Blantyre
- Baron Stuart de Decies
- Baron Stuart de Rothesay
- Baron Stuart of Wortley
- Duke of Albany
- Duke of Monmouth James Scott, eldest illegitimate son of Charles II, attainted
- Duke of Buccleuch and Duke of Queensberry Descendants of James Scott, the Duke of Monmouth
- Duke of Cleveland and Duke of Southampton Descendants of Charles FitzRoy, an illegitimate son of Charles II, extinct
- Duke of Grafton Descendants of Henry FitzRoy, an illegitimate son of Charles II
- Duke of St Albans Descendants of Charles Beauclerk, an illegitimate son of Charles II
- Duke of Richmond, Duke of Lennox and Duke of Gordon Descendants of Charles Lennox, an illegitimate son of Charles II
- Duke of Berwick Descendants of James FitzJames, the illegitimate son of James II, attainted, almost extinct
- Duke of Fitz-James Descendants of James FitzJames, the illegitimate son of James II, extinct
