= Clan Glen =

- Motto: Alta Pete (Aim high)

Profile
- Country: Scotland
- Region: Renfrewshire
- District: The Lennox
- Clan Glen no longer has a chief, and is an armigerous clan

Clan Glen (sometimes “Glenn”) is a small, armigerous clan first that has been documented as early as 1292. The name “Glen” refers to a topographical feature. Distinct families appear to have arisen independently in Peebles, Renfrewshire, and England. This discussion focuses on Clan Glen in Renfrewshire, including branches of Bar, Glenlora, then in Ulster and America.

According to Thomas Allen Glenn, the lordship of Glen (consisting of Bar, Gaytflat, Lynthills, Brigend, and other lands) was originally granted by King David I to Walter the Steward. Glenn supposes that Richard, lord of the Glen, or his predecessors must have received the lordship of Glen by marriage with a woman from the Stewart family. The Glen surname stems from the lordship of the Glen, Renfrewshire.

The Glen Coat of Arms bears three martlets. According to heraldry expert William Newton, the martlet, a mythical bird, was a symbol of a knight-errant.

The limited published Y DNA data about the Glens indicates the Glens of Bar ancient origin may be Anglo Norman in nature. This is consistent with Thomas Allen Glenn’s hypothesis that the Glen family were originally called de Ness and traveled with Walter fitz Alan from Ness, Shrewsbury, England. Glenn believed they were granted the lands in the lordship of the Glen by the Stewarts. Roger de Ness witnessed a charter of Walter fitz Alan to Paisley Priory around 1173. Henry de Ness appeared in multiple charters of Alan Stewart, son of Walter fitz Alan related to the lands of Paisley. The Glens continued to possess lands rented from Paisley Abbey into the 16th century.

Many books have been written about the Glens, but few remain in print or are available in digital format.

== Early historic records ==
The name “Glen” first appears on record in 1292 when King Edward I confirmed a charter to the lands of Gaytflat by Richard, lord of the Glen, in favor of his son John. A man named Robert Nase (Richard Ness) previously held possession of these lands under Richard’s predecessors. Richard, lord of Glen, may be the first recorded Glen from the Lennox.

The prior charter must have been recorded after Richard’s death because two days later the late Richard de Glen’s lands were held in wardship until the marriage of his heirs.

"Nov. 14. 1292. Grant by the king, overlord of Scotland, to Richard Freser, for a fine of 100 marks, whereof he will pay 25 marks a year, of the wardship of the lands late of Richard de Glen, tenant in chief of the royal dignity of Scotland, until the full age of the heirs with the marriage of the same."

The lands must not have been restored upon the marriage of any heir of Richard de Glen, because the lands were forfeit in 1298, perhaps due to the actions of a son of Richard de Glen.

The surname next appears in 1296 in a petition by various widows “whose husbands had died in the army against the king.” Sarah, widow of Duncan of the Glen (d. 1292), swore the oath of fealty to King Edward I and begged the king for the restoration of her husband’s lands.

Sarah, who was the wife of Duncan of the Glen, who has remained a widow for four years, petitions for her inheritance which is seised in the hand of Earl Patrick, by reason of the war.

As discussed below, Duncan of Glen may be the first recorded Glen of Peebleshire.

== Glen of the Lennox ==
In 1304, Sir David of Glen was taken prisoner defending Stirling Castle. He came into the king’s peace in 1304. Thereafter, he was paid an allowance while being held in an English prison at Newcastle-on-Tyne through 1313.

In 1319, John of Glen, was described as King Robert the Bruce’s seargand when the King granted him John rights to a pond at Balmuto. Presumably John was John, the son or grandson of Richard, lord of Glen.

John’s son, Robert, married Margaret, the daughter of King Robert the Bruce. Margaret and her husband received a grant of Nether Pitedye as “the king’s sister” from King David II. Some commentators claim she was an illegitimate daughter, while others suggest she was the daughter of the King’s second wife, Elizabeth de Burgh.

== Glen of Bar ==
Robert of Glen was succeeded by William of Glen (d.1373). Paul of Glen, son and heir of William, conveyed lands in Kilmun to Sir Archibald Campbell of Lochow. Paul’s son and heir, John of Bar, entered into the service of Robert Stewart of Lorne. John may have had multiple sons including William and Alan. Rental records from the lands of Paisley Abbey contain several references to Alan Glen, who was the son of John, lord of Glen. He was likely the brother of William of Glen who witnessed donation of the fishing of Crockat Shot by Robert Lord Lyll to Monks of Paisley in 1452. William of Glen was succeeded by Robert Glen. Robert was dead by 1506. He was succeeded by James Glen of Bar, I.

James Glen was the captain of 102 footmen at Flodden. Around 1525, “James Glen of ye Bar” is mentioned in the Paisley Abbey rental records. He was in an assize in 1543 and died a year later.

He was succeeded by his son, also known as James Glen of Bar. He appears in various legal instruments, including witnessing a charter in 1560 and a letter of reversion in 1566. The latter had a longstanding dispute with John Semple of Fullwood in 1562. In 1564, upon a petition by James Glen of Bar, Robert Sempill, third Lord Sempill, was stripped of his Commission of the Judiciary by the Privy Counsel for abusing Glen. James Glen of Bar was married to Catherine Hamilton. From a 1568 instrument, we learn James had sons William (his heir) and James.

William Glen of Bar succeeded his father. He died in 1608, possibly without issue. William was succeeded by his younger brother, Alexander Glen of Bar around 1610. In turn, Alexander was succeeded by his son Archibald Glen around 1629. Thereafter, Bar Castle passed to the Hamiltons.

== Glens of Glenlora and Ulster ==
Archibald Glen appears to have had sons Thomas and David. David held the lands of Glenlora which neighbored Bar by 1598. In 1606, his sons John and James migrated to Ulster. These men are believed to be the progenitors of most of the Glens who lived in Ulster.

Rev. Patrick Hamilton granted lands in East Hollywood, Down. John Glen moved from down to Lifford, Donegal. His eldest son, John, was a merchant in Londerry. He died in 1686. He was succeeded by his son John, who in turn had sons Ninian and John. Ninian was succeeded by James Glen who lived in Tyrone, then migrated to Pennsylvania.

== Glen of Peebleshire ==
In 1324, King Robert the Bruce granted Colban the lands of Cults, in Peebles. Colban was married to Annabel Douglas, and likely received the lands as tocher (dowry). Colban’s parentage is uncertain. Like Duncan of Glen, he bore a Celtic name. The limited published Y DNA data that has been published indicates that the Glens of Peebles are of proto-Celtic origins and independent of the Glens of the Lennox (Bar, Balmuto, etc.).

== Glens in North America ==
In addition to James Glen in Tyrone who moved to Pennsylvania, other Glens are known to have settled in Pennsylvania and South Carolina.

John Glenn who married Mary Seawright and ultimately moved to Leacock Township, Lancaster County, Pennsylvania. Their children included Thomas, John, Mary and Jean. John Glenn may have been a son of Thomas Glen of Tircullen, Aghanloo. John Glenn was the progenitor of a line that extended from Pennsylvania, to Indiana, and beyond.

The Glens of South Carolina descend from Alexander Glen from Linlithgow. He died by 1722. His sons included Andrew Glen, James Glen, governor of South Carolina, and Dr. Thomas Glen (who married Isabella Wright, the widow of James Graham former Chief Justice of South Carolina), and Dr. John Glen.

=== James Glen ===
James Glen (1701 – July 18, 1777) was born in Linlithgow in 1701 to Alexander Glen and his wife Marion Graham. He was appointed Royal Governor of South Carolina in 1738 but did not arrive in the province until December 17, 1743. He served as governor until June 1, 1756. On June 21, 1761, Glen returned to Europe and died in London. However, his siblings appear to be the progenitors of the Glens in the Carolinas and Georgia.

=== John Glenn ===
The most famous descendant of the Scottish family of Glens is American astronaut and U.S. Senator John Glenn.
