= Paisley Abbey =

Church in Paisley, Scotland

Coordinates: 55°50′42″N 4°25′14″W

- Paisley Abbey and grounds
- Paisley Abbey
- Location: Abbey Close; Paisley, Renfrewshire
- Country: Scotland
- Denomination: Church of Scotland
- Previous denomination: Roman Catholic
- Website: www.paisleyabbey.org.uk

History
- Status: Parish kirk

Architecture
- Functional status: Active
- Heritage designation: Category A
- Designated: 1971
- Architectural type: Church
- Style: Gothic; Gothic revival
- Years built: 14th century 19th century
- Groundbreaking: 1163

Paisley Abbey is a parish church of the Church of Scotland on the east bank of the White Cart Water in the centre of the town of Paisley, Renfrewshire, about 7 miles (11 kilometres) west of Glasgow, in Scotland. Replacing a church of the 8th century, the abbey church was founded as a Cluniac priory in 1163, with the present Gothic building dating from the 14th and 19th centuries. Following the Reformation in the 16th century, it became a Church of Scotland parish kirk.

== History ==
=== Saint Mirren ===
It is believed that Saint Mirin (or Saint Mirren) founded a community on this site in 7th century. Sometime after his death a shrine to the Saint was established, becoming a popular site of pilgrimage and veneration. The name Paisley may derive from the Brythonic (Cumbric) Passeleg, 'basilica' (derived from the Greek), i.e. 'major church', recalling an early, though undocumented, ecclesiastical importance.

=== Priory ===
In 1163, Walter fitz Alan, the first High Steward of Scotland issued a legitimate charter for a priory to be set up on land owned by him in Paisley. It was dedicated to SS. Mary, James, Mirin and Milburga. Around 13 monks came from the Cluniac priory at Much Wenlock in Shropshire to found the community. Shortly before he died in 1204, Alan fitz Walter, the second High Steward, gifted the custody and revenues of the parish of Kingarth, which covered all of the Isle of Bute, to the priory. Walter Stewart, the third High Steward, made a grant of timber from the forest of Sanquhar for the building of the priory in around 1213. Gille Chriosd, lord of Tarbet, granted unrestricted access to his woods on Loch Lomondside for the extraction of other construction timbers.

Monks from Paisley founded Crossraguel Abbey in Carrick, Ayrshire, in 1244.

=== Abbey ===
Under the patronage of the Stewarts and with the backing of the powerful founding Abbey of Cluny in Burgundy, Paisley grew rapidly. It was raised to the status of abbey in 1245.

In 1307, Edward I of England had the abbey burned down. It was rebuilt later in the 14th century. William Wallace, born in nearby Elderslie, is believed to have been educated in the abbey for some time when he was a boy.

In 1316, Marjorie Bruce, daughter of Robert I of Scotland and wife of Walter Stewart, the sixth High Steward of Scotland, was out riding near the abbey. During the ride, she fell from her horse and as she was heavily pregnant at the time, she was taken to Paisley Abbey for medical care. There, King Robert II was born by caesarean section, in a time when anaesthesia would not have been available. She was later buried at the abbey. A cairn, at the junction of Dundonald Road and Renfrew Road, approximately 1 mile (2 kilometres) to the north of the Abbey, marks the spot where she reputedly fell from her horse.

In 1491, absolution was granted by Abbot George Shaw, representing the Pope and in the presence of the relics, to James IV of Scotland and others implicated in the death of James III at the Battle of Sauchieburn. By 1499 Shaw had had built a new, larger pilgrims' chapel and added the sculptured stone frieze which can still be seen today, showing scenes from the life of St Miren. It was originally brightly painted and may have been part of a rear panel of an altar before being put up as a frieze on the wall.

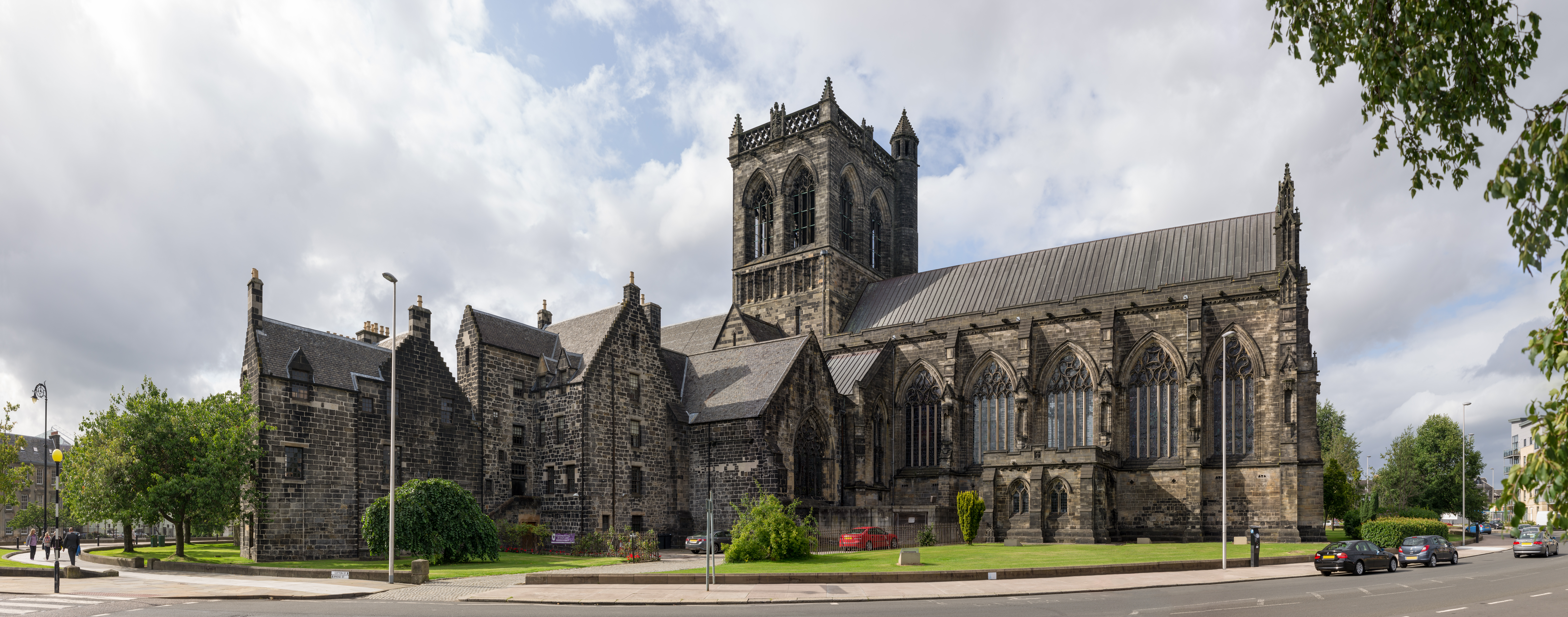
Paisley Abbey from the south east

A succession of fires and the collapse of the tower in the 15th and 16th centuries left the building in a partially ruined state. Although the western section was still used for worship, the eastern section was widely plundered for its stone. From 1858 to 1928 the north porch and the eastern choir were reconstructed on the remains of the ruined walls by the architect Macgregor Chalmers. After his death, work on the choir was completed by Sir Robert Lorimer.

== Points of interest ==
Paisley Abbey is the burial place of all six High Stewards of Scotland, Marjorie Bruce who was the mother of Robert II, and the wives of Robert II. The Celtic Barochan Cross, once sited near the village of Houston, Renfrewshire, is now inside the abbey itself. The cross is thought to date from the 10th century. In the abbey's nave, the Wallace Memorial Window, which depicts the image of Samson, was donated in 1873.

=== Paisley Abbey Drain ===
The earliest written record of a tunnel around Paisley Abbey dates from 1829, when workmen digging in the garden of one John Crawford in Ellis Lane, fell through into a tunnel. Early maps show Ellis Lane being in the region of the modern manhole leading to the drain. As the significance of this discovery was not realised at the time, access to the hole was quickly covered, and soon forgotten about. That was until 1879, when The Glasgow Herald mentioned the discovery of the subterranean passage. This was also forgotten about, and not ‘re-discovered’ until 1990, when a 90 metre stretch of tunnel was found running from the abbey to the White Cart. The drain is thought to date from AD 1350-1400 and is up to 2m wide and up to 2.2m high. The drain contains stonemasons marks on the walls, and marks where gates used to be. Before accessing the drain, water has to be pumped out. Paisley Abbey Drain is designated by Historic Environment Scotland as a Scheduled Ancient Monument and has similarities to other monastery drains, such as Fountains Abbey, Dundrennan Abbey and Melrose Abbey. A virtual tour of the drain is available on YouTube.

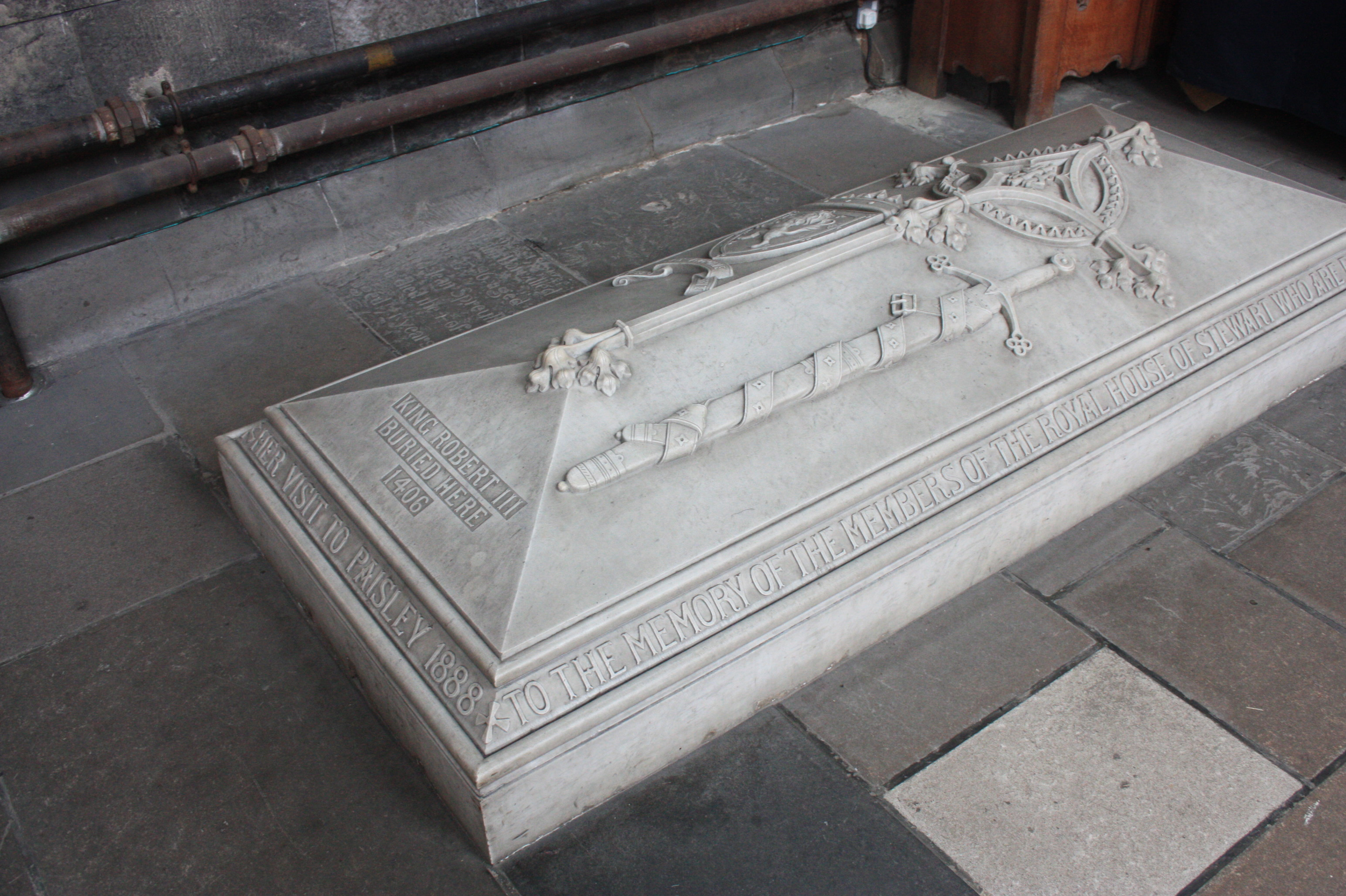
The grave of Robert III, Paisley Abbey

Archaeological investigations and excavations took place in 1996, 2009, 2011, 2013, 2015, 2017 and 2019 and many items discovered. Some of these are now on display in the abbey.

These include:

- a slate with music marked on it - which is believed to be the oldest example of polyphonic music found in Scotland
- imported cloth seals
- chamber pots from c.1500
- tweezers
- carved bone handles
- pottery fragments
- slate fragments
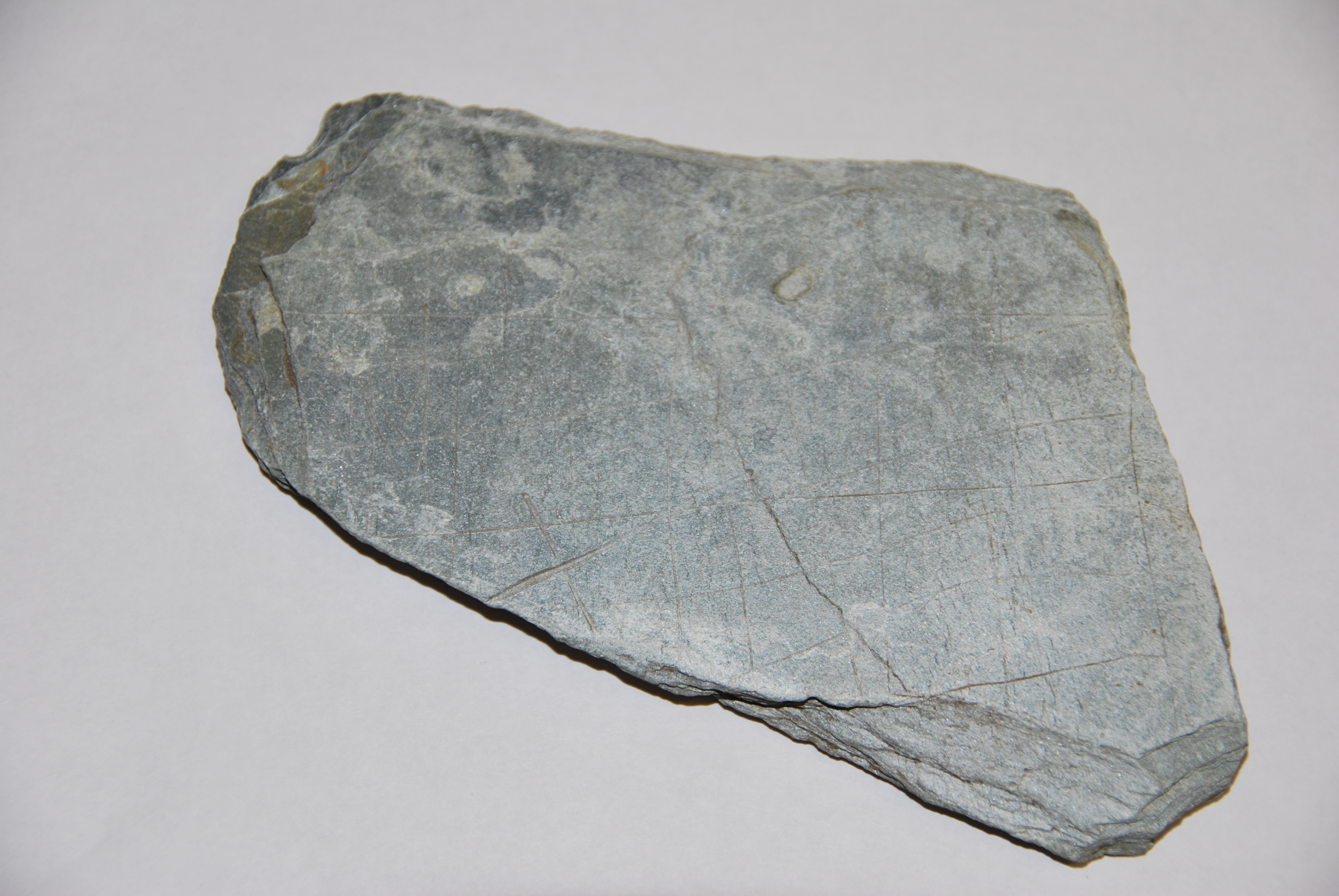

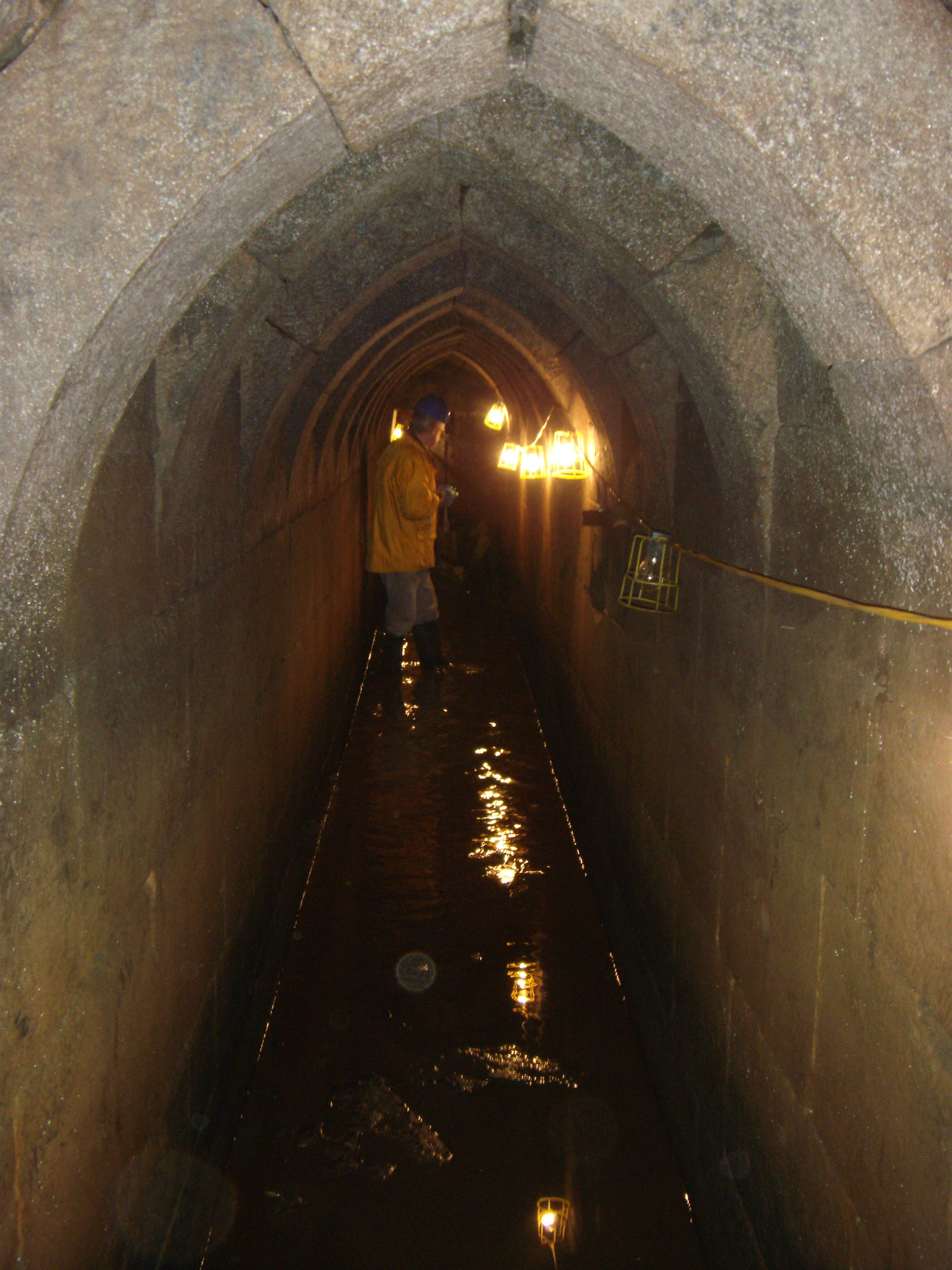

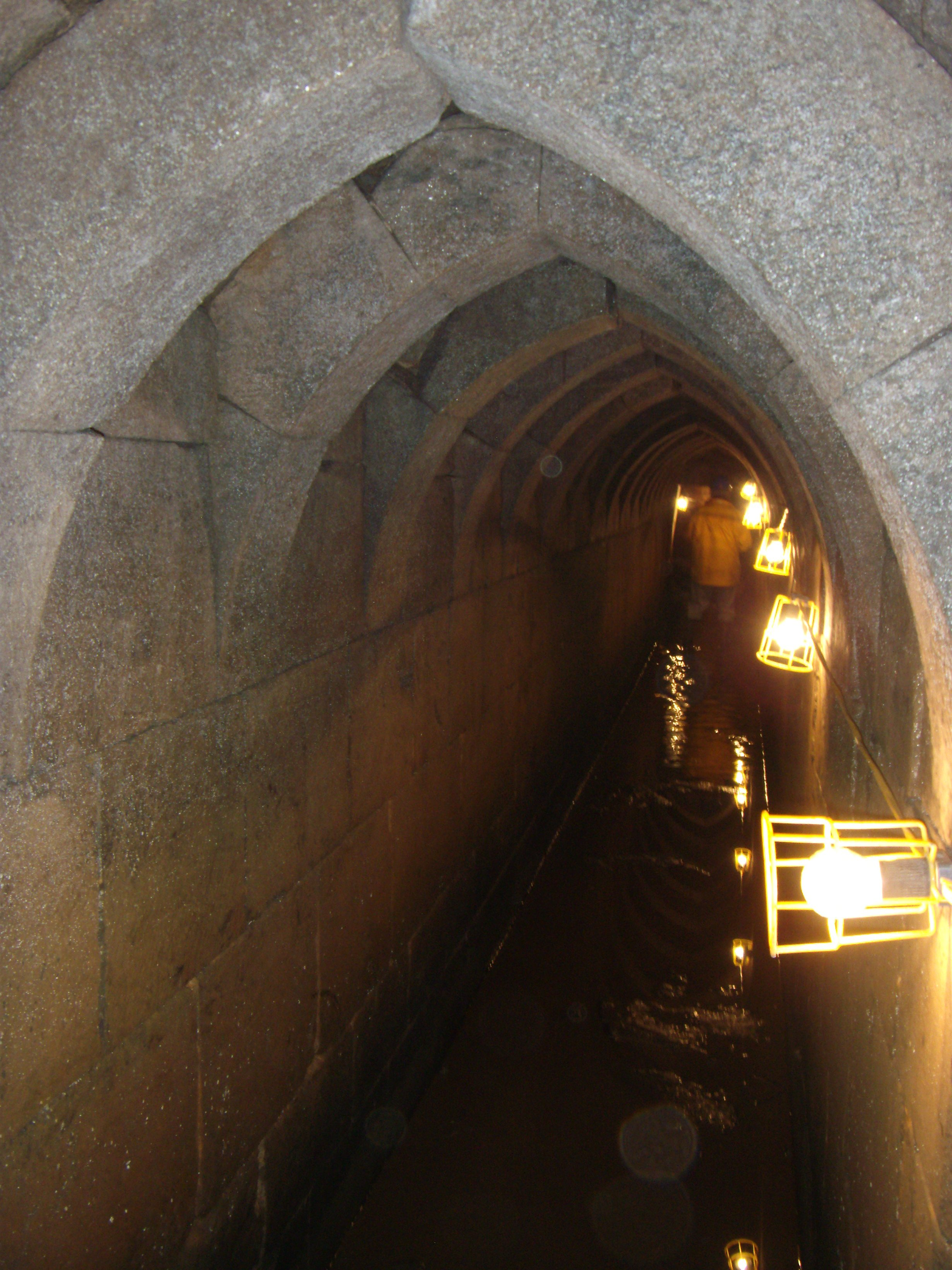

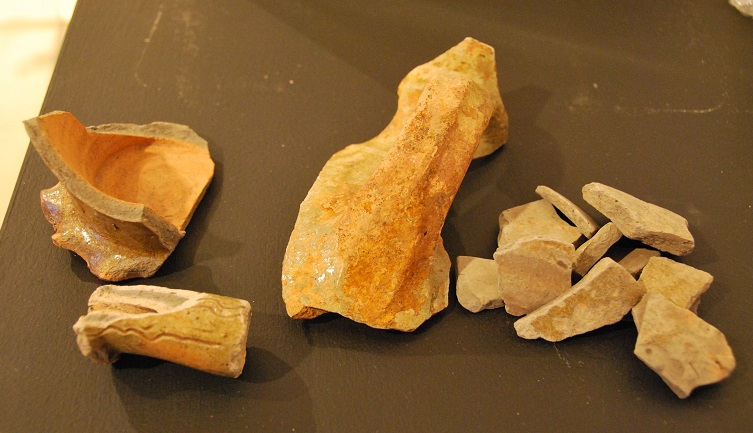

Events to involve the public in the archaeological investigation of the drain have been held, with the Renfrewshire Local History Forum.

=== Tombs ===
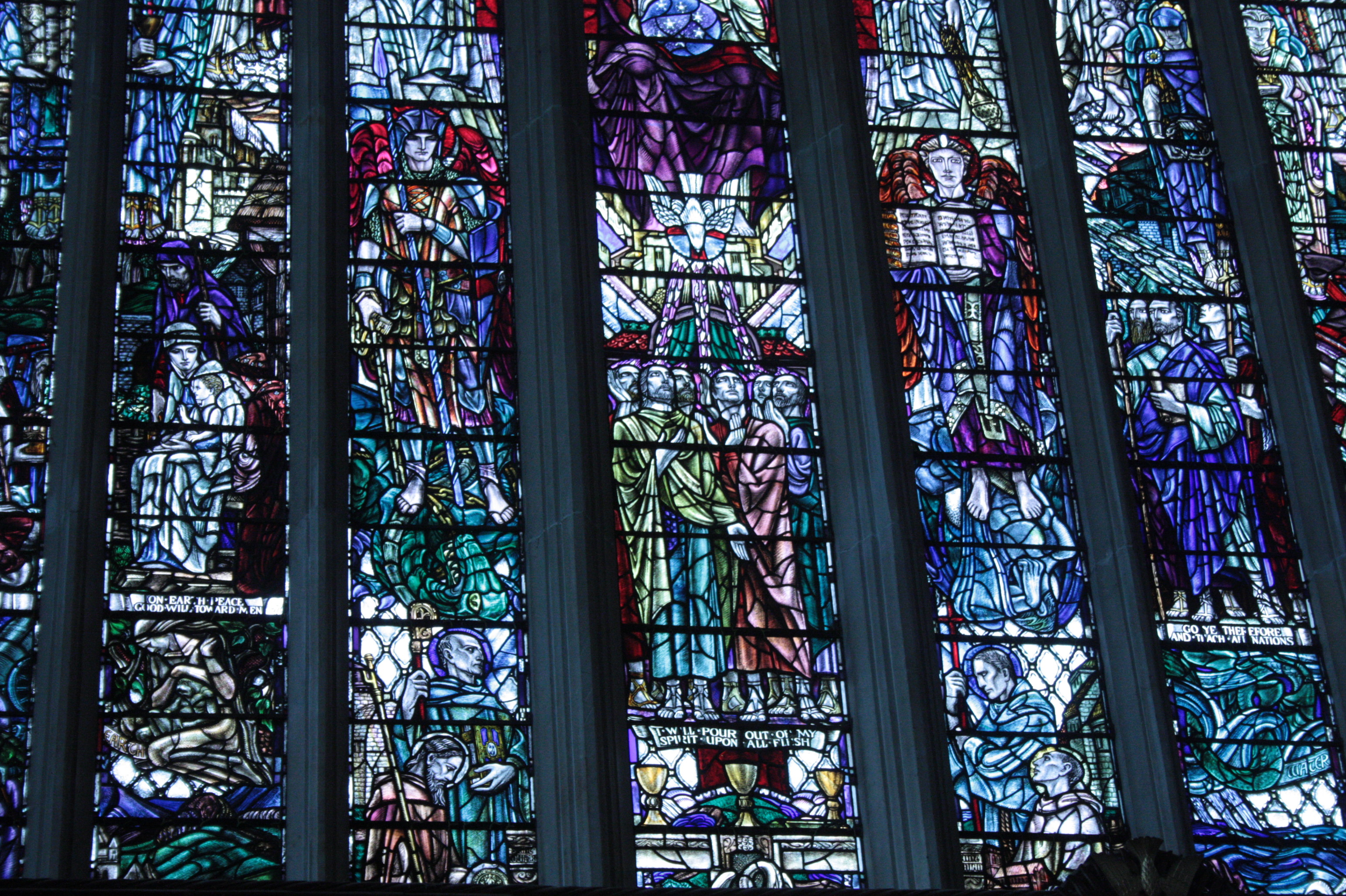
The main east window of Paisley Abbey by Douglas Strachan (detail)

A tomb in the choir incorporating a much-restored female effigy is widely believed to be that of Marjorie Bruce. Although there is no evidence that she is buried at exactly that location, her remains are thought to be within the abbey. The tomb is reconstructed from fragments of different origin – the base is likely to have originally formed part of the pulpitum of the Abbey (a stone screen separating nave and choir), such as survives at Glasgow Cathedral.

Opposite Marjorie Bruce lie the tombs of Robert III of Scotland and Simon fitz Alan. A Latin inscription commemorates the three children of Margaret Seton and Claud Hamilton, 1st Lord Paisley who died as infants; Margaret (1577), Henry (1585), and Alexander (1587).

=== Stained glass ===
Stained glass (removed in the Reformation) began to be replaced in the 1870s. Major works include a window by Edward Burne-Jones and the huge east window by Douglas Strachan.

The dramatic memorial window to James D. D. Shaw dates from 1989 and is by John Clark.

=== Abbey organ ===
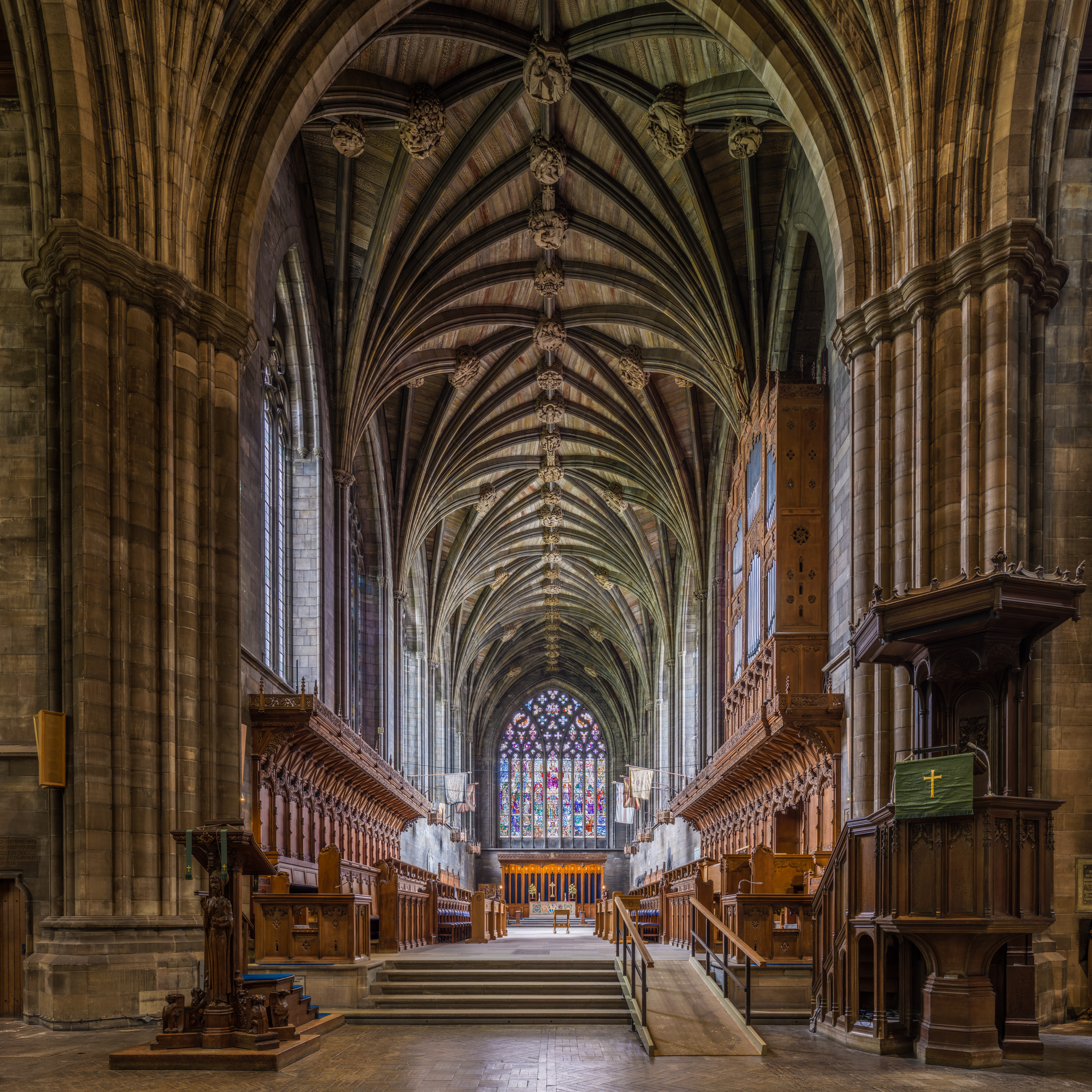
The choir, organ, and great East Window

The Abbey organ is reputedly one of the finest in Scotland, and was originally built by the most distinguished of all 19th-century organ builders, Cavaillé-Coll of Paris in 1874. This is one of only six in the UK. Since 1874 it has been rebuilt and extended four times. The organ as rebuilt by Walker in 1968 has 4 manuals, 65 stops and 5448 pipes.(National Pipe Organ Register; "The Organ at Paisley Abbey", booklet pub. Paisley Abbey) In 2009 the instrument underwent a major restoration by Harrison and Harrison of Durham. The work included major cleaning and servicing, the provision of a new wind system and the addition of a 32 ft contre bombarde. The latter was part of the 1968 scheme by Ralph Downes but not included in the work actually undertaken.

=== Internal architectural details ===
The twelve angel corbels and stone communion table are by Pilkington Jackson, sculptor of the iconic Robert the Bruce statue at Bannockburn. The ceiling bosses are designed by Sir Robert Lorimer and carved by James A Young. The choir stalls, with their wealth of carved animals are by William and Alexander Clow.

=== External architectural details ===
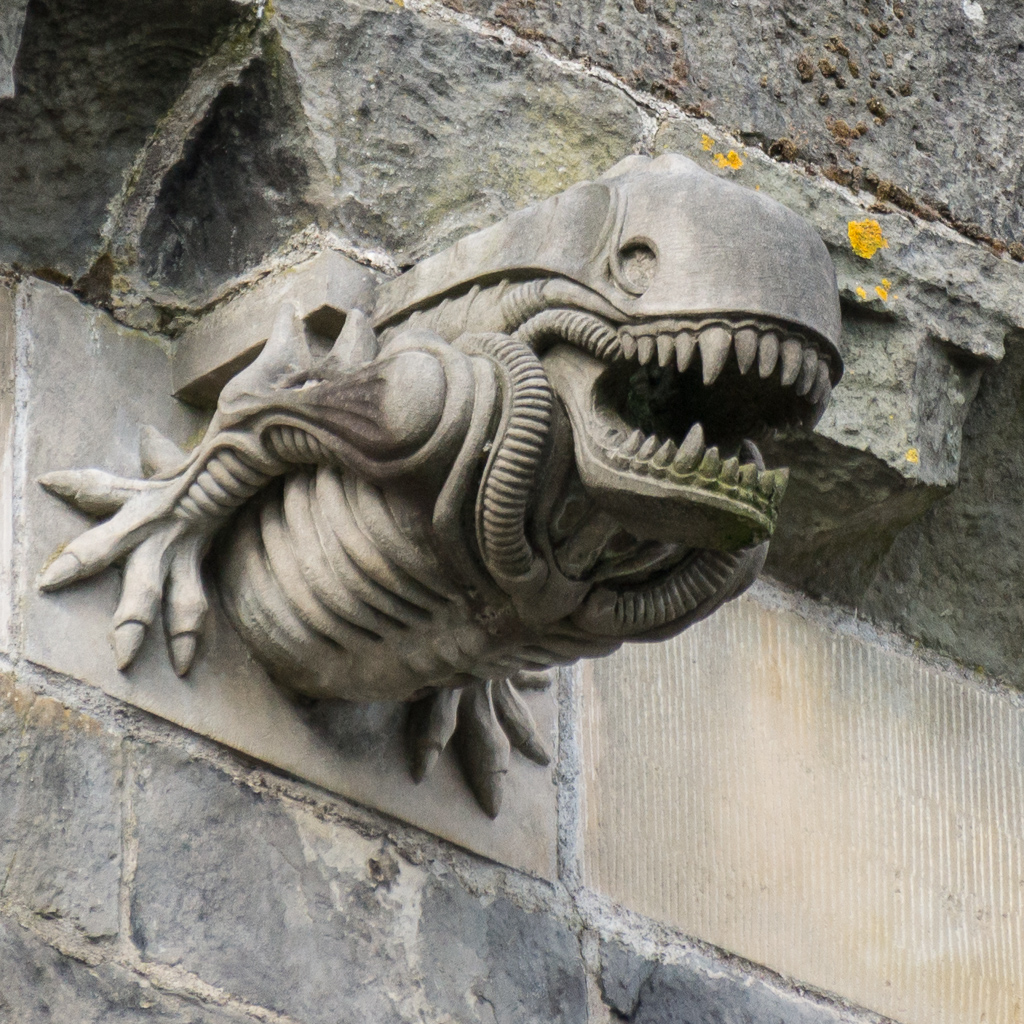
One of the abbey's dozens of gargoyles, famous for its resemblance to the xenomorph creature from the 1979 film Alien. Erected in the 1990s.

Paisley Abbey has been rebuilt and its original design modified as a result of the building being destroyed in 1307, its tower's collapse in the 16th century, and general disrepair that occurred as the result of time and weather. During a restoration project that took place in the 1990s, a stonemason from Edinburgh hired to replace twelve crumbling stone gargoyles erected one bearing a strong resemblance to the space creature from the 1979 science fiction film Alien. A picture of the gargoyle went viral in 2013, though a photograph of the statue first surfaced on the internet in 1997. In 2002, it was confirmed the abbey would be subject to a 10-year-long restoration project.

== Current congregation ==
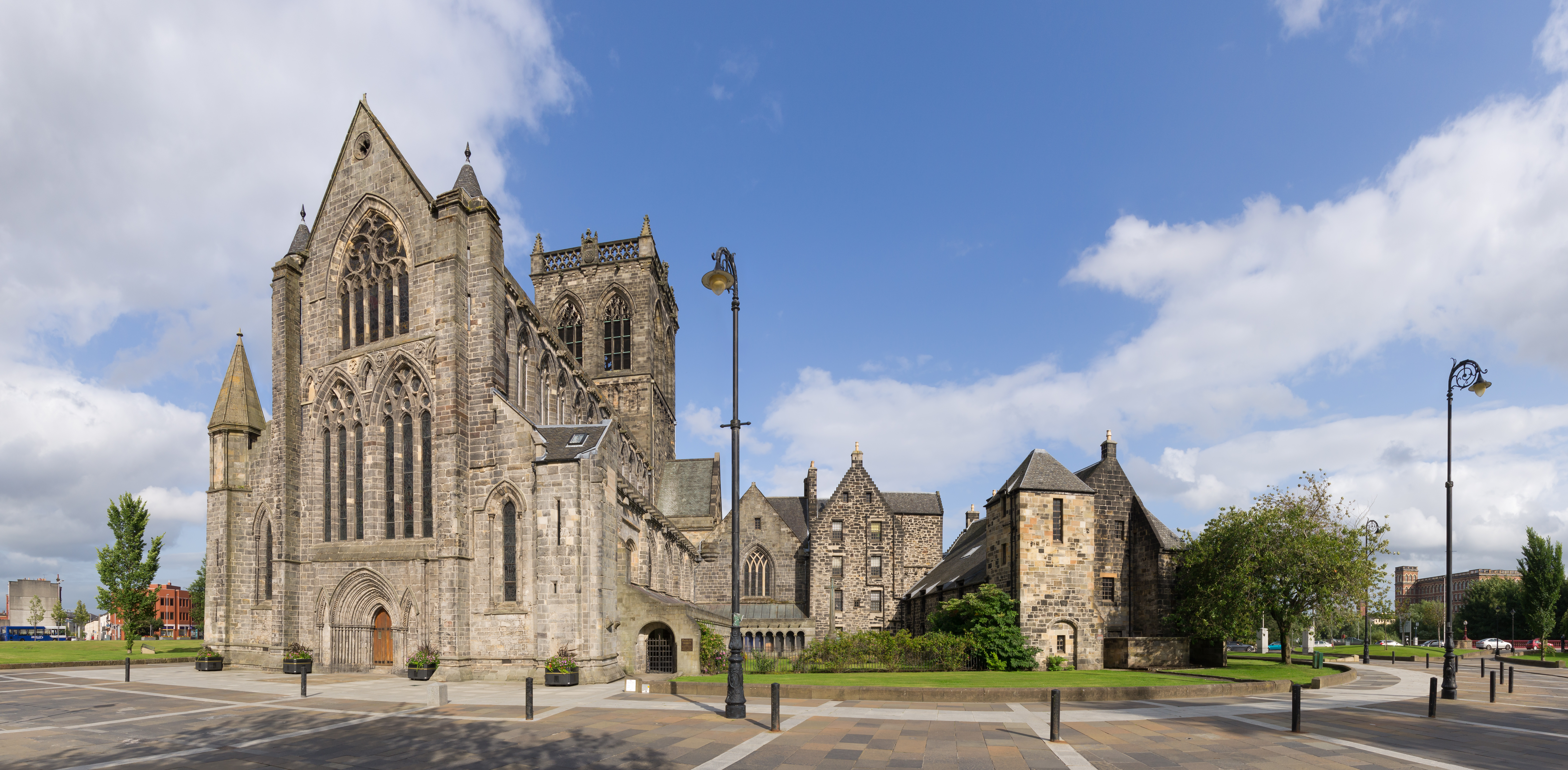
Paisley Abbey from the west, including St Mirin's chapel and the Place of Paisley. On the distant right is the Anchor Mills building.

Paisley Abbey is used for worship services every Sunday. Since the Reformation the Abbey has served as a parish church in the Church of Scotland. In 2002 the congregation had 823 members. The minister (since December 2022) is the Reverend Jim Gibson.

== Burials ==
- Walter fitz Alan, 1st High Steward of Scotland (1177)
- Alan fitz Walter, 2nd High Steward of Scotland (1204)
- Walter Stewart, 3rd High Steward of Scotland (1246)
- Beatrix nic Gille Crist-Stewart, Countess of Angus (1252)
- Alexander Stewart, 4th High Steward of Scotland (1282)
- Isabella of Mar, first wife of Robert the Bruce (1296)
- James Stewart, 5th High Steward of Scotland (1309)
- Marjorie Bruce, daughter of Robert the Bruce (1316 or 1317)
- Walter Stewart, 6th High Steward of Scotland (1327)
- Elizabeth Mure, first wife of Robert II (1355)
- Euphemia de Ross, second wife of Robert II (1386)
- Robert III, King of Scots (1406)
- James Stewart of Cardonald (1584)
- James Hamilton, 1st Earl of Abercorn (1618)
- Claud Hamilton, 1st Lord Paisley (1621)
- James Hamilton, 8th Earl of Abercorn (1789)
- William Cathcart, 1st Earl Cathcart (1843)

== See also ==
- Abbey Bridge
- Abbot of Paisley, for list of priors, abbots and commendators
- Crossraguel Abbey, founded by monks from Paisley
- List of Category A listed buildings in Renfrewshire
- List of listed buildings in Paisley, Renfrewshire

== Sources ==
- Malden, John. (Edr), (2000). The Monastery & Abbey of Paisley: Lectures from the Renfrewshire Local History Forum's Conference 11 / 12 September 1999, with additional papers. Renfrewshire: Renfrewshire Local History Forum. ISBN 0-9529195-7-5.
