= Clan Stuart of Bute =

Highland Scottish clan

- Motto: Nobilis Est Ira Leonis (The Lion's Anger is Noble)

Profile
- Region: Highland
- District: Argyll
- Plant badge: Unknown

Chief
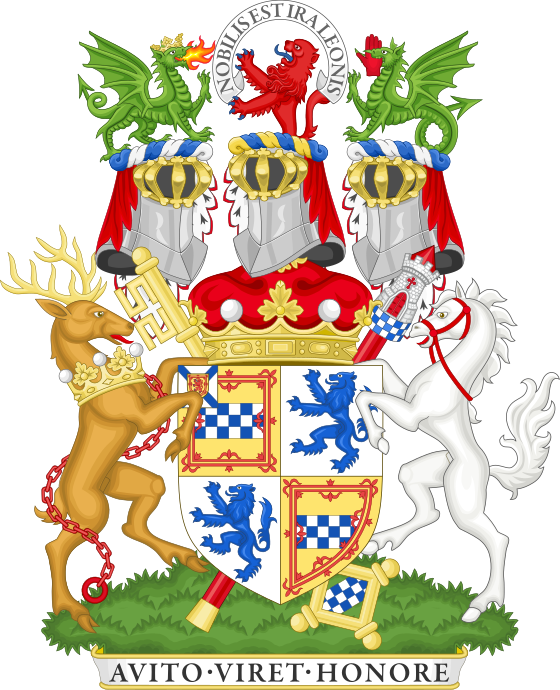
- John Bryson Crichton-Stuart
- 8th Marquess of Bute
- Seat: Mount Stuart House
- Historic seat: Rothesay, Argyll and Bute

Clan Stuart of Bute is a Highland Scottish Clan and is a branch of the larger Clan Stewart.

== History ==
=== Origins of the Clan ===
The Stewards or Seneschals of Dol in Brittany came to Scotland through Normandy and England when David I of Scotland returned in 1124 to claim his throne. In Scotland they rose to a high rank, becoming High Stewards of Scotland.

Through a marriage to Marjorie Bruce, daughter of king Robert the Bruce, the Stewarts acquired the throne of Scotland when David II of Scotland, only son of Robert the Bruce died. Robert Stewart, who reigned as Robert II of Scotland gave to his illegitimate son by Moira Leitch (according to tradition), Sir John Stewart (1360–1445), the Isle of Bute, the Isle of Arran and the Isle of Cumbrae. The king conferred these lands into a County and made his son the Sheriff. This was confirmed in a charter by Robert III of Scotland in 1400.

=== 15th century ===
John Stewart ( 1360-1445) was 1st Sheriff of Bute between 1445 and 1449. He was succeeded by his son, James Stewart, who was 2nd Sheriff of Bute. His son Stewart 3rd Sheriff of Bute was the father of Ninian Stewart who was confirmed in the office of Sheriff of Bute as well as the lands of Ardmaleish, Greenan, the Mill of Kilcatten and also Corrigillis. Ninian Stewart was created Hereditary Captain and Keeper of Rothesay Castle on Bute in 1498 by James IV of Scotland, an honour still held by the family today, and shown in their coat of arms.

=== 16th century ===
Ninian Stewart married three times. In 1539 he was succeeded by his son James Stewart. James suffered during the feud between the Earl of Arran who was regent of Scotland and the Earl of Lennox. James Stewart was succeeded by his son, John Stewart, who attended the Parliament in Edinburgh as the Commissioner for Bute. The family favoured the French spelling of the name as Stuart, which was introduced by Mary, Queen of Scots, and is still used by the present Chiefs.

=== 17th century and Civil War ===
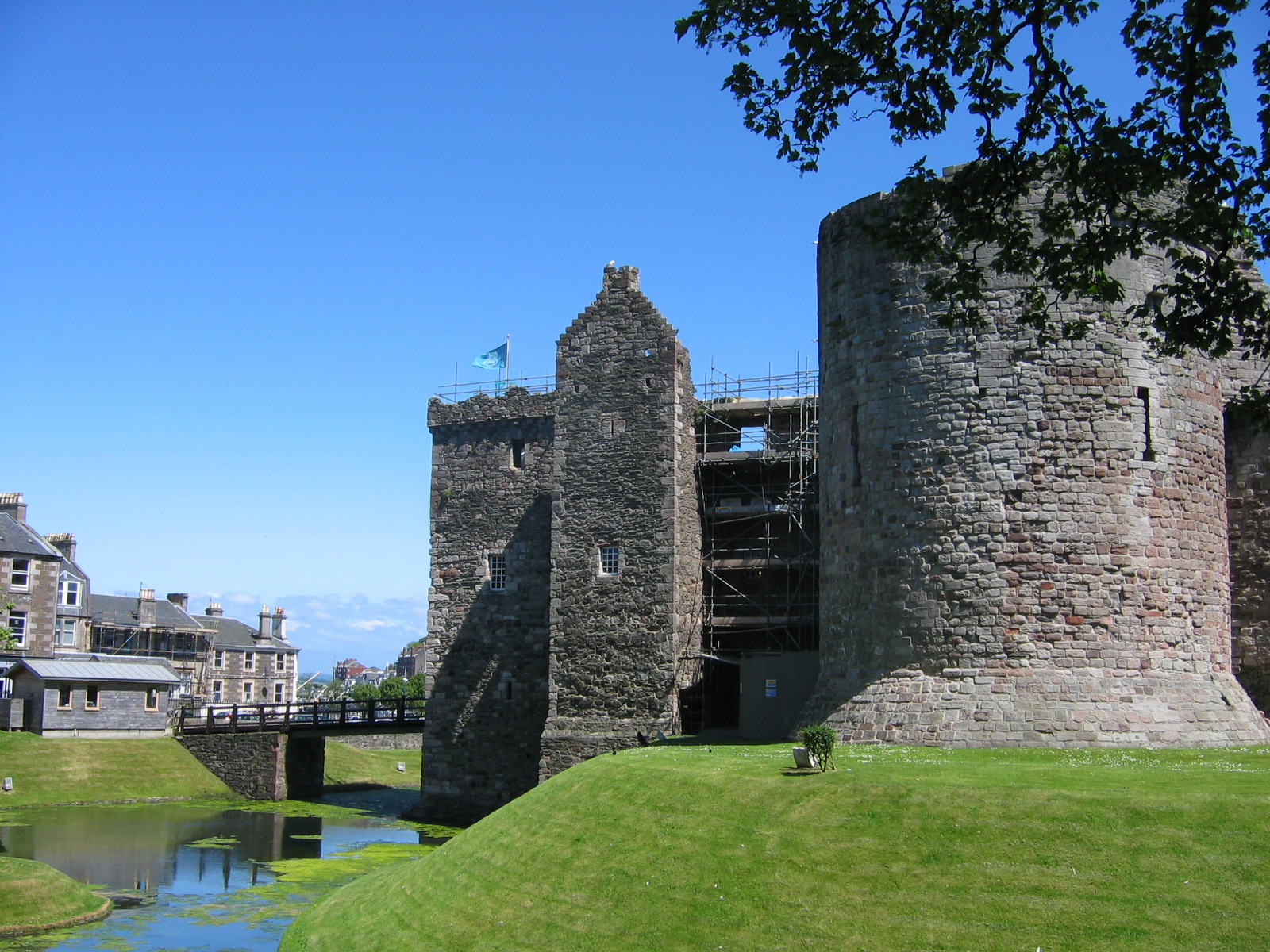
Rothesay Castle was held by the Chiefs of Clan Stuart of Bute in the 15th century and during the Scottish Civil War of the 17th century.

On 28 March 1627 Sir James Stuart of Bute was created 1st Stuart Baronet, of Bute in the Baronetage of Nova Scotia by Charles I of England. During the early part of the Scottish Civil War he garrisoned Rothesay Castle and raised soldiers for the king at his own expense. Stuart was appointed royal lieutenant for the west of Scotland. He decided to take possession of Dumbarton Castle but two frigates that were sent to assist fell foul of stormy weather, with one being completely wrecked. As a result, Sir James Stuart was forced to flee to Ireland. When Oliver Cromwell was victorious Sir James Stuart was forced to pay a substantial fine to redeem his estates that had been sequestrated.

Sir James Stuart's grandson was another James Stuart, who upon the forfeiture of the Earl of Argyll in 1681, was appointed as Colonel of the local Militia. This James Stuart supported the accession of William of Orange and his wife, Queen Mary Stuart.

=== 18th century and Jacobite Risings ===
During the reign of Anne, Queen of Great Britain, James Stuart was made a Privy Councillor and a Commissioner for the negotiation of Treaty of Union. He was created 1st Earl of Bute on 14 April 1703, as well as 1st Viscount Kingarth and 1st Lord Mount Stuart, Cumra and Inchmarnock, all in the Peerage of Scotland. However, by 1706, the Earl was convinced that a union with England would not work and withdrew his support when he realised that Parliament would vote in favour of the alliance. Stuart married the eldest daughter of Sir George Mackenzie of Rosehaugh.

After the succession of George I of Great Britain, James Stuart, 2nd Earl of Bute, was appointed as Commissioner for Trade and Police in Scotland, Lord Lieutenant of Bute and also a Gentleman of the Bedchamber from 1721 to 1723. During the Jacobite Rising of 1715 he commanded the Bute and Argyll Militia and kept that part of the country peaceful.

John Stuart, 3rd Earl of Bute, was a tutor to Prince George and when the prince became king George III, the 3rd Earl of Bute was made Groom of the Stool between 1760 and 1761, a Privy Councillor, First Lord of the Treasury and eventually Prime Minister of Great Britain and Ireland in 1762. He concluded a treaty with France in 1763 which brought to an end the Seven Years' War. He was succeeded by his son, John Stewart, Lord Mount Stuart, Cumra and Inchmarnock, who married Lady Elizabeth Penelope McDouall-Crichton, the only daughter, child and heiress of Patrick McDouall-Crichton, 6th Earl of Dumfries, etc., in the Peerage of Scotland, and wife Margaret Crauford. In 1796 his rank as 3rd Earl of Bute was advanced to 1st Marquess of Bute in the Peerage of Great Britain.

=== 19th century ===
John Crichton-Stuart, 2nd Marquess of Bute, was a noted Member of Parliament in the House of Commons and industrialist who is largely responsible for developing the docks in Cardiff to rival those in Liverpool. By the time of his successor's death in 1900, Cardiff had become the greatest coal port in the World. John Patrick Crichton-Stuart, 3rd Marquess of Bute, industrial magnate, antiquarian, scholar, philanthropist, and architectural patron, rebuilt Castell Coch and Cardiff Castle as tributes to the high art of the Middle Ages and was created a Knight-Companion of the Most Ancient and Most Noble Order of the Thistle.

=== 20th century ===
John Crichton-Stuart, 4th Marquess of Bute, was a passionate in Architecture who was also created a Knight-Companion of the Most Ancient and Most Noble Order of the Thistle, while his son John Crichton-Stuart, 5th Marquess of Bute, a maternal descendant of William IV of the United Kingdom by Dorothea Bland, was an expert in Ornithology. He was succeeded by his son, John Crichton-Stuart, 6th Marquess of Bute, who had a passion for Scottish heritage and received a Knight-Commander degree of the Most Excellent Order of the British Empire for his efforts before he died in 1993.

== Clan Chief ==
The present Chief of Clan Stuart of Bute is John Bryson Crichton-Stuart, 8th Marquess of Bute.

== Clan castles ==
- Brodick Castle
- Rothesay Castle

== See also ==
- Scottish Clan
- Marquess of Bute
- Clan Stewart, a Scottish Clan, recognised by the Lord Lyon King of Arms, though without a recognised Chief
- Clan Stewart of Appin, a Scottish Clan, recognised by the Lord Lyon King of Arms, though without a recognised Chief
- Clan Stewart of Balquhidder, another branch of the Clan Stewart
