= John Stewart of Ralston =

- Arms of Stewart of Ralston: Or, a fess chequy azure and argent, in chief a lion passant gules, armed and tongued azure.
- Born: c. 1324; Scotland
- Died: 1416 (aged c. 92); Scotland
- Spouse: Alicia de Mure
- Children: John Stewart Walter Stewart Marjorie Stewart Ergadia Stewart Margaret Stewart Isabel Stewart
- Parent: Walter Stewart Isabel Graham
- Family: House of Stewart

John Stewart of Ralston (c. 1324 - 1416) was a Scottish nobleman. The second son of Walter Stewart, High Steward of Scotland, he was a half-brother of Robert II of Scotland.

== Life ==
John Stewart was born in c. 1324. He was the eldest son of Walter Stewart, 6th High Steward of Scotland, and his second wife, Isabel Graham. Stewart's father died in 1327, after which he inherited the lands of Ralston in Cunninghame.

Stewart may have begun his political career as early as 1344, as the recipient of a charter from David II of Scotland. He has been confused with his contemporary, John Stewart of Dalswinton, who was captured at the Battle of Neville's Cross in 1346. Stewart was associated with his elder half-brother, Robert the Steward, amid tensions over David II's captivity in England during 1352. He joined his half-brother at Perth in 1364, when the latter performed penance for failing to fulfill an agreement with the Church to legitimate his children.

After becoming King of Scots in 1371, Robert II appointed Stewart as seneschal of the Scottish royal household. Stewart held this office until 1377. His half-brother granted him an annual pension of £20 in 1380, which he received consistently for the rest of his life.

Stewart died in 1416, aged c. 92.

== Marriage and issue ==
John married Alicia, daughter of Reginald de Mure and Sybilla de Graham, they are known to have had the following issue:

- John Stewart, died without issue.
- Walter Stewart, died without issue.
- Marjorie Stewart, married firstly Alexander Lindsay of Glenesk and secondly William Douglas of Lugton, had issue.
- Ergadia Stewart, married Patrick de Graham of Kincardine and Dundaff, had issue.
- Margaret Stewart, married John Hay of Tullbody, had issue.
- Isabel Stewart
