= James of Scotland =

James of Scotland may refer to:

- James I of Scotland (1394–1437), King of Scots
- James II of Scotland (1430–1460), King of Scots
- James III of Scotland (c. 1451–1488), King of Scots
- James IV of Scotland (1473–1513), King of Scots
- James V of Scotland (1512–1542), King of Scots
- James VI of Scotland (1566–1625), King of Scots
- James VII of Scotland (1633–1701), King of Scots

== See also ==
- James Stewart, 5th High Steward of Scotland (1243–1309), Guardian of Scotland
