= John Lindsay of Wauchope =

13th-14th century Scottish noble

John Lindsay, Lord of Wauchope and Staplegorton (died c.1310), was a Scottish noble.

His parentage is currently unknown. John was appointed as Lord Chamberlain of Scotland in 1278. He received the lands of Wauchope in Dumfries and Galloway in 1285, from Alexander III of Scotland.

John swore fealty and homage to King Edward I of England on 28 July 1296 at Berwick. He is recorded as providing security for the release of Alexander, son of Alexander de Baliol, who was a prisoner in 1310 in England.

== Marriage and issue ==
John is known to have had the following known issue:

- Philip Lindsay of Staplegorton (died 1317), married Beatrice le Chamberlain. John de Lindsay, canon of Glasgow was Philip's son and heir.
- Simon Lindsay of Wauchope, married Isabella, had issue.
