= John de Roxburgh =

14th-century Scottish noble

John de Roxburgh Lord Chamberlain of Scotland

John de Roxburgh (died 1346) was a Scottish clerk and soldier who was Lord Chamberlain of Scotland, fought and was killed in the Battle of Neville's Cross in 1346.

He was clerk to both Robert Peebles and Reginald de Mure, prior Lord Chamberlains of Scotland. Appointed as Lord Chamberlain of Scotland by David II, in 1343, he died in the Battle of Neville's Cross on 17 October 1346, during the rout of the Scottish army. King David II was captured and a large number of the nobility of Scotland were killed or captured.
