= Bathgate Castle =

Former castle near Bathgate, West Lothian, Scotland

- Bathgate, West Lothian, Scotland

Site information
- Condition: Ruined

Location
- Location in West Lothian, Scotland
- Location within West Lothian
- Coordinates: 55.8948°N 3.6314°W

Site history
- Built: c. 12th century
- Materials: Earthwork and timber

Garrison information
- Designations: Scheduled monument (1961)

Bathgate Castle was a motte-and-bailey castle near Bathgate, West Lothian. It served as the caput (administrative centre) of the barony of Bathgate. Today, only the motte and some earthworks survive, and the site lies within the grounds of a modern golf course.

== History ==
The castle was likely constructed in the 12th century and functioned as a fortified residence for the local barony. In 1314, the castle became part of the dowry of Marjorie Bruce, daughter of King Robert the Bruce, upon her marriage to Walter Stewart, 6th High Steward of Scotland. Walter died at the castle in 1327, after which it appears to have been abandoned.

Bathgate Castle was strategically located near the main routes connecting Linlithgow and the surrounding West Lothian settlements, allowing the barony to monitor trade and movement in the region. Archaeological surveys indicate that the site may have included timber buildings and a defensive palisade atop the motte.

== Modern Significance ==
The remaining earthworks were designated a scheduled monument by Historic Environment Scotland in 1961, recognizing the castle’s historical importance. While no significant stone structures remain, the site continues to attract interest from historians and local heritage enthusiasts. Its location within a golf course provides a unique example of how historic sites are preserved within modern recreational landscape.
