= Rothesay Castle =

Castle in Argyll and Bute, Scotland

- Rothesay, Isle of Bute, Scotland
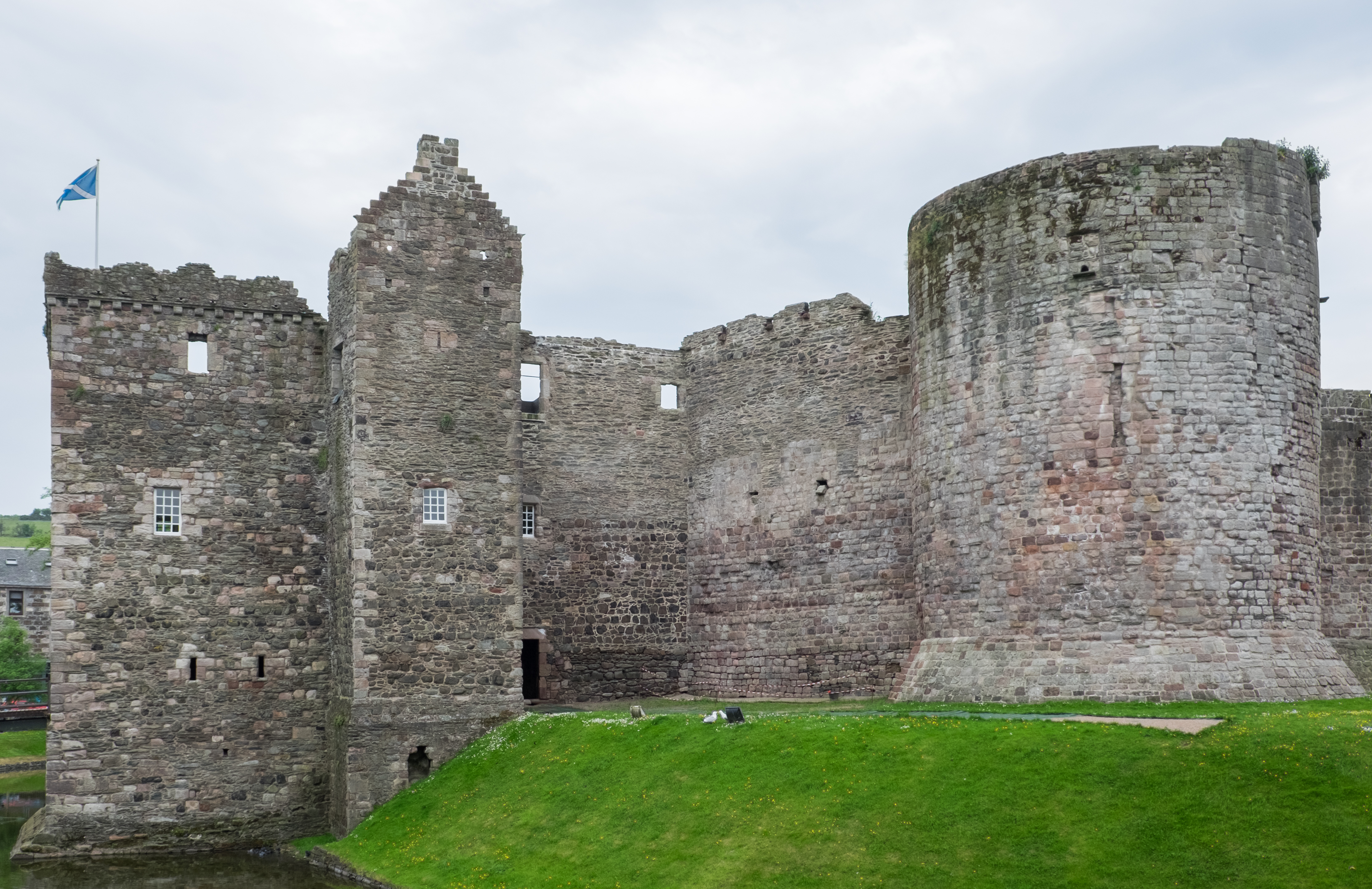
- Rothesay Castle, with the 16th century forework in the centre, and the 13th century "Pigeon Tower" on the right

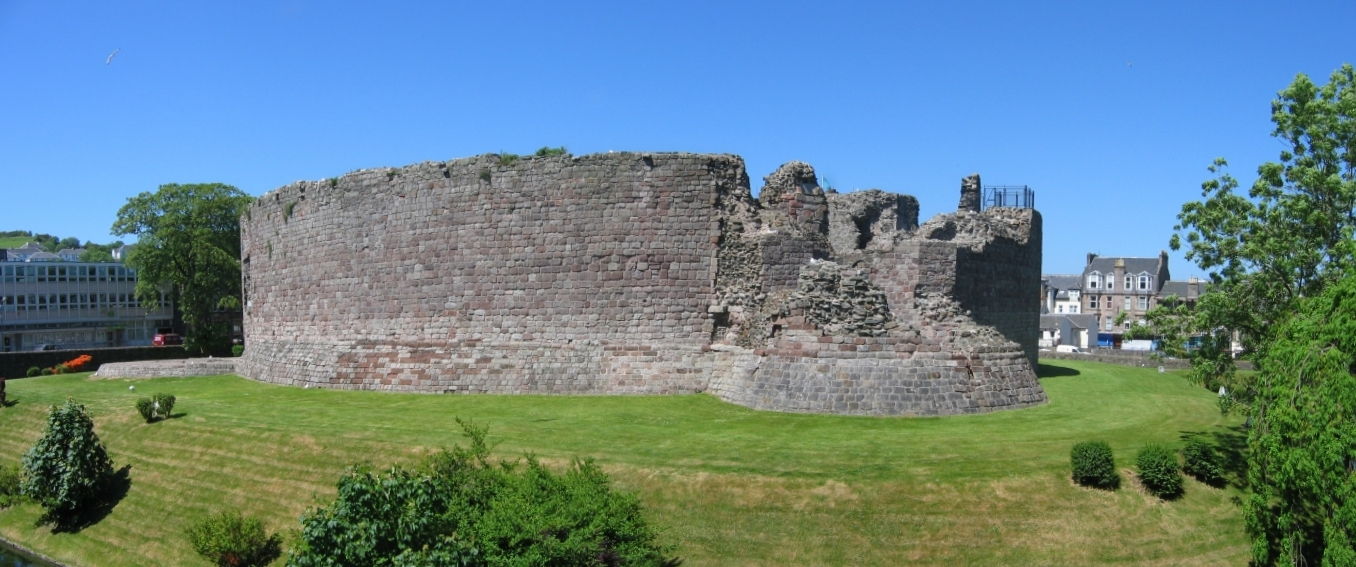
- The 13th century curtain wall seen from the south-east, across the moat. The bases of the south-east and south-west towers can be seen.

Site information
- Type: Curtain Wall and Moat
- Owner: Historic Environment Scotland
- Controlled by: House of Stuart
- Open to the public: Yes
- Condition: Ruined

Location
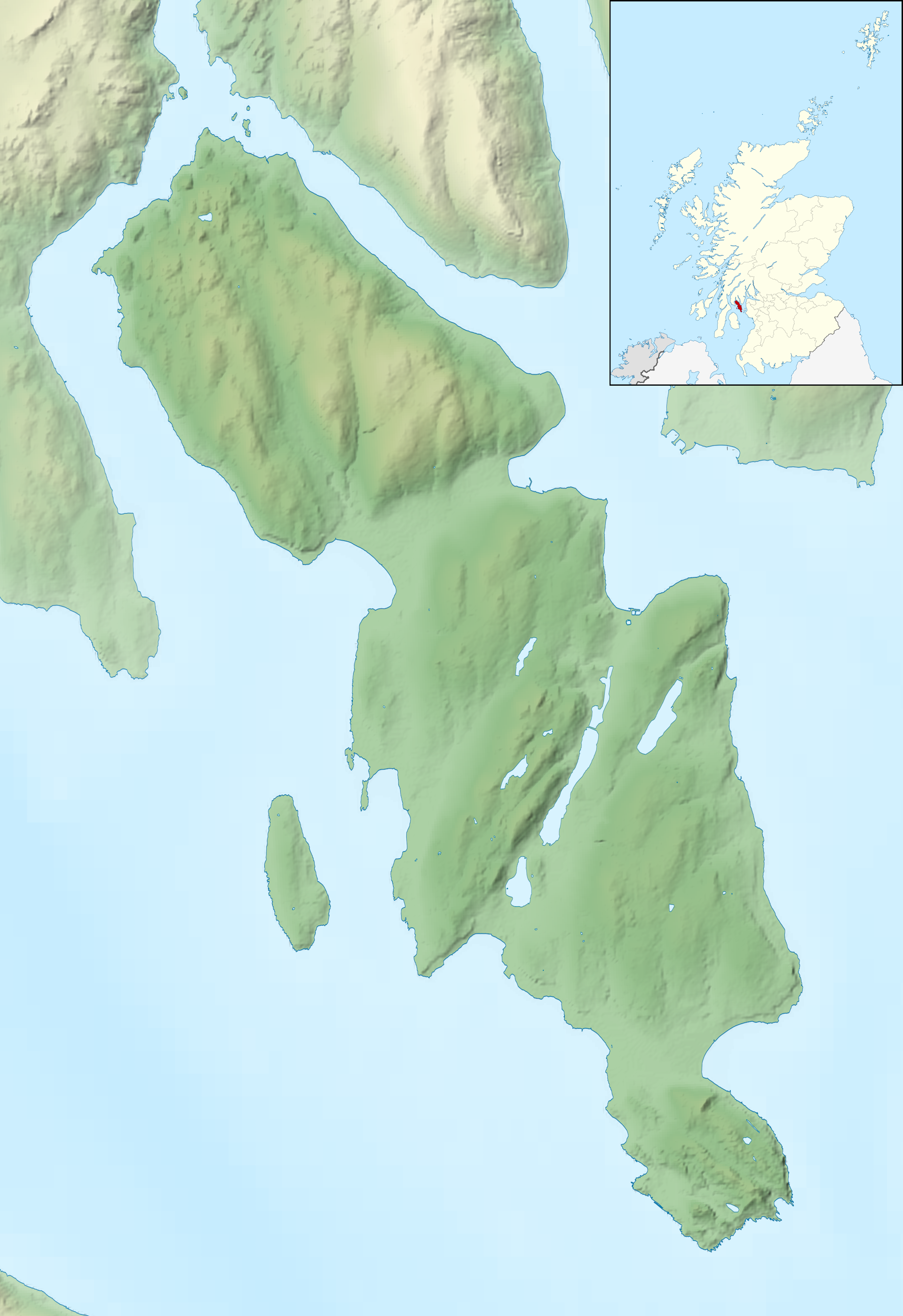
- Shown on Bute
- Coordinates: 55.836461°N 5.055041°W

Site history
- Built: 13thC
- Built by: Alan, High Steward of Scotland or Walter Stewart
- In use: Until 1660
- Materials: Stone

Rothesay Castle is a ruined castle in Rothesay, the principal town on the Isle of Bute, in western Scotland. Located at NS086646, the castle has been described as "one of the most remarkable in Scotland", for its long history dating back to the beginning of the 13th century, and its unusual circular plan.

The castle comprises a huge curtain wall, strengthened by four round towers, together with a 16th-century forework, the whole surrounded by a broad moat. Built by the Stewart family, it survived Norse attacks to become a royal residence. Though falling into ruin after the 17th century, the castle was repaired by the Marquess of Bute before passing into state care in the 20th century.

A paddle steamer named after the castle was constructed in 1816.

== The early castle ==
The castle was built either by Alan fitz Walter, Steward of Scotland (died 1204), or by his succeeding son Walter (died 1246). During Alan's tenure, the family added the Isle of Bute to their lordship. A wooden castle was constructed first, but the stone circular curtain wall was in place by the 1230s, when the castle was attacked and taken by the Norwegian-backed fleet of Óspakr-Hákon, King of the Isles (died 1230). According to Hákonar saga Hákonarsonar, Óspakr's forces fought for three days to take the castle, breaking down part of the eastern wall by hewing the stone with their axes. This saga is the earliest recorded account of an assault on a Scottish castle. In 1263, Rothesay was taken again by the Norwegian forces under Hákon Hákonarson, King of Norway (died 1263) before the Battle of Largs. Although the Battle of Largs is called indecisive, Hákon's campaign was a failure, the Norse retreated, and it effectively ended Norwegian authority in western Scotland.

The early castle comprised only the roughly circular curtain wall, 2.7 m (9 ft) thick, 7.9 m (26 ft) high and around 42 m (138 ft) in diameter, built on a low mound, with a battlement on top accessed by open stairs. The moat was connected to the sea, the shoreline then being closer to the north-east of the Castle than it is today. The broad crenellations can be made out within the walls, which were later raised. Holes in the upper wall would have supported a timber bretasche, a projecting structure serving as an extended battlement. This curtain wall was built of coursed ashlar, and had only two openings in its length. The main gate was an arched opening with a simple timber door. The second opening was a small postern gate in the west wall, later blocked.

In the later part of the 13th century, the castle was strengthened by the addition of four round towers, of which only the north-west survives intact. These three-storey towers had strong splayed bases, with arrow slits below the crenellated parapet. A portcullis was added to the main gate.

== Wars of independence and the rise of the Stewarts ==
During the Wars of Scottish Independence, Rothesay was held by the English, but was taken by Robert the Bruce in 1311. It then returned to English hands in 1334, before being taken again by the Scots. Following the accession of the Stewarts to the throne of Scotland in 1371, the castle became a favourite residence of kings Robert II and Robert III, who died here in 1406. Robert II granted the hereditary keepership of the castle to his son John, ancestor of the Earls and Marquesses of Bute. Robert III made his eldest son David Duke of Rothesay in 1401, beginning a tradition of honouring the heir to the throne of Scotland with this title. In 1462 the castle survived a siege by the forces of John of Islay, Earl of Ross and the last Lord of the Isles.

== 16th and 17th centuries ==
In the early 16th century Rothesay Castle was strengthened again. Construction of a gatehouse keep, extending from the north of the curtain wall, began around the turn of the century, to provide more modern accommodation for James IV. The curtain wall itself was raised up to ten metres in height, the works continuing into the reign of James V. In 1527 the castle withstood another siege by the Master of Ruthven, which destroyed much of the burgh of Rothesay. In 1544, the castle fell to the Earl of Lennox, acting for the English during the so-called "Rough Wooing".

The forework is an L-plan structure, which jutted into the moat and was accessed by a drawbridge. The lower floor comprised a vaulted entrance tunnel running into the older castle courtyard. Above, the four-storey tower contained royal lodgings, and still bears the royal coat of arms above the door. Also in the early 16th century, a chapel was constructed inside the old castle. Simple in form, the chapel measured around 7 m (23 ft) by 14 m (45 ft), and is now the only surviving structure within the curtain wall. The north-west tower was converted into a doocot, and is known as the "Pigeon Tower", due to the nest boxes built into the outside wall.

Esmé Stewart, 1st Duke of Lennox, a favourite of James VI was compelled by the Ruthven Regime to leave Scotland. He went first to Dumbarton Castle, then stayed at Rothesay Castle in October 1582.

Rothesay was garrisoned for the occupying forces of Oliver Cromwell, who invaded Scotland with his New Model Army in the early 1650s. On their departure in 1660, the troops partially dismantled the structure. What was left was burned by the supporters of Archibald Campbell, 9th Earl of Argyll during his rising of 1685, in support of the Monmouth Rebellion against James VII.

== Repair and restoration ==
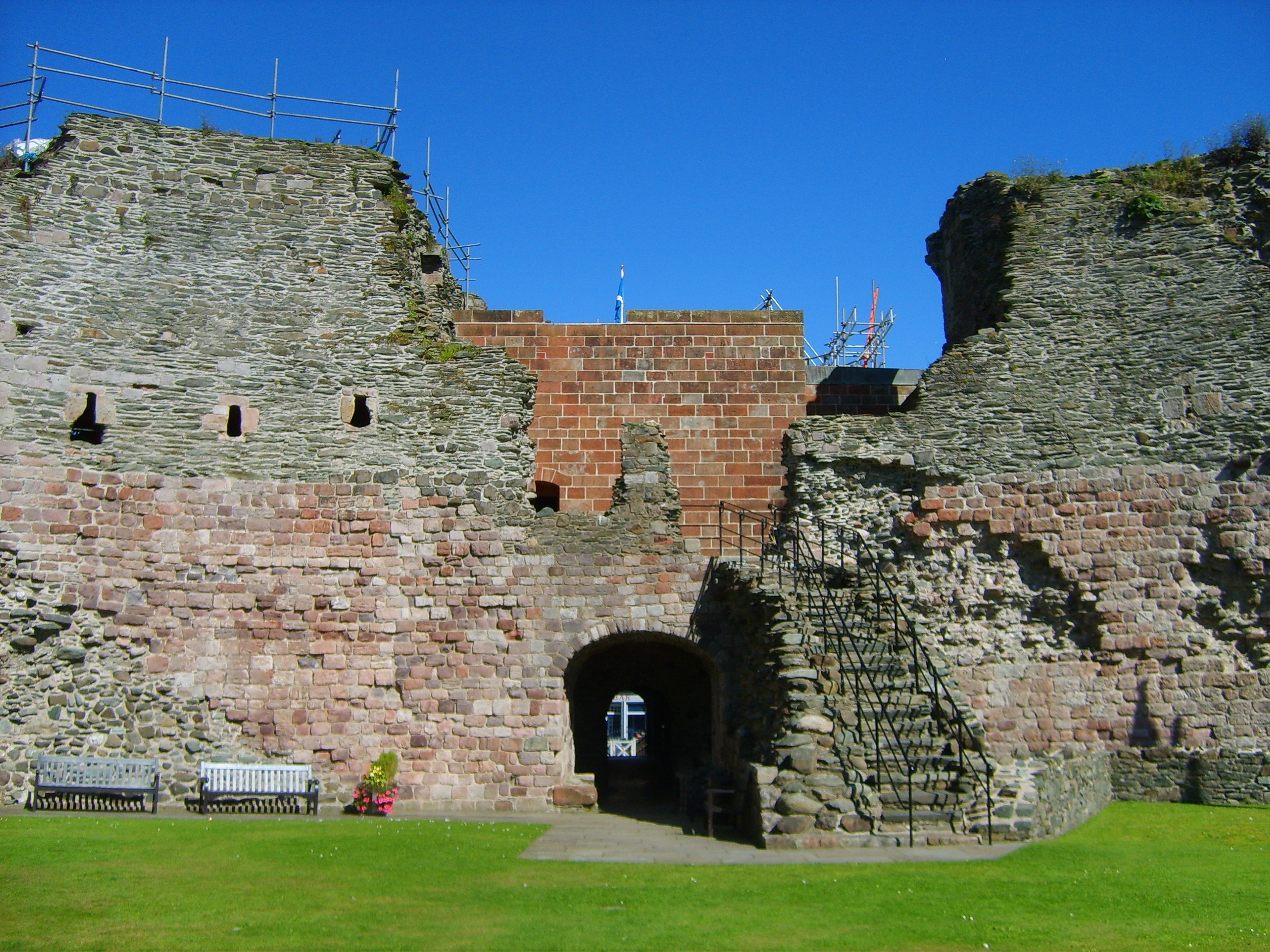
The vaulted entrance tunnel.

Following a long period of neglect, the 2nd Marquess of Bute employed 70 men to excavate the ruins, clearing large amounts of rubbish from the castle in 1816–17. But it was not until the 1871 that work resumed and the ruins were stabilised. The 3rd Marquess, a keen restorer of historic buildings, embarked upon a series of repairs and restorations, following surveys and advice from his regular architect William Burges. His "restorations" continued until 1900, and include the clearing and shaping of the moat, as well as the red sandstone additions to the forework, which reinstated the hall roof while significantly altering the character of the building.

In 1961 Rothesay Castle was given to the state, and is now a Scheduled Ancient Monument, in the care of Historic Environment Scotland.

The castle is open to visitors year round. Fine views can be seen from the top of the walls over the town and back towards the mainland.

== Other sources ==
- Scott, Nicki (2018). Rothesay Castle. Edinburgh: Historic Scotland. ISBN 978-1-84917-138-0.
