= Lord High Chamberlain of Scotland =

Political office in Scotland

Holders of the office of Lord Chamberlain of Scotland are known from about 1124. It was ranked by King Malcolm as the third great Officer of State, called Camerarius Domini Regis, and had a salary of £200 per annum allotted to him. He anciently collected the revenues of the Crown, at least before Scotland had a Treasurer, of which office there is no vestige until the restoration of King James I when he disbursed the money necessary for the maintenance of the King's Household.

The Great Chamberlain had jurisdiction for judging of all crimes committed within burgh, and of the crime of forestalling; and was in effect Justice-General over the burghs, and held Chamberlain-ayrs every year for that purpose; the form whereof is set down in Iter Camerarii, the Chamberlain-ayr. He was a supreme judge and his Decrees could not be questioned by any inferior judicatory. His sentences were to be put into execution by the baillies of burghs. He also settled the prices of provisions within burghs, and the fees of the workmen in the Mint.

The Chamberlain lost his financial functions after 1425 to the Treasurer. The position was vacant from 1558 to 1565 and again from 1569. It was occupied in 1580 for the cousin of James I, Esmé Stewart, 1st Duke of Lennox, whose appearance as a Great Officer of State in 1581 is attributable to his personal standing with the king rather than his office. But following the Raid of Ruthven, 24 August 1582, the Great Chamberlain lost his supervision of the royal burghs.

Thereafter the office was held by successive Dukes of Lennox (heritably from 1603) until resigned to the Crown ad perpetuam remanentiam by the Duke of Richmond and Lennox in 1703, since which time no Great Chamberlain has been appointed. In 1711 a form of the office was revived in a Commission of Chamberlainry and Trade, which lapsed on the death of Queen Anne.

== Lord Chamberlains ==
David I of Scotland (r. 1124–1153)

- Edmund, witnessed a charter granting Annandale to Robert de Brus in 1124.
- 1130-1153: Herbert

Malcolm IV of Scotland (r. 1153–1165)

- 1153-1160: Herbert
- 1160-1165: Nicolaus, later Lord Chancellor

William the Lion (r. 1165–1214)

- 1165-1189: Walter de Berkeley of Redcastle
- 1205-14: Philip de Valognes

Alexander II of Scotland (r. 1214–1249)

- 1214-19: William de Valognes
- Hugo de Giffard, Lord of Yester and Morham
- John de Melville
- 1216: Henry de Balliol (d. 1246)
- 1228: David de Bernham (later Bishop of St Andrews)
- 1231-41: Sir John de Maccuswel (or Maxwell)

Alexander III of Scotland (r. 1249–1286)

- c.1250/1: Sir Robert de Meyners
- 1252-1255: William, Earl of Mar
- 1255-1257: David de Lindsay of Barnweill and Byres
- 1257-60: Aylmer de Maxwell lord of Caerlaverock, Sheriff of Dumfries, son of Sir John Maxwell.
- 1260: William, Earl of Mar, again
- 1267: Sir Reginald Cheyne
- 1269: Sir Thomas Randolph, father of Thomas Randolph, 1st Earl of Moray,
- 1278: John de Lindsay

Guardians of the Kingdom of Scotland (First Interregnum)(1286-1292)

- 1287-1292: Alexander de Baliol

John Balliol (r. 1292–1329)

- 1292-1296: Alexander de Baliol

Guardians of the Kingdom of Scotland (Second Interregnum) (1296-1306)

- 1297-1307: John Sandale

Robert the Bruce (r. 1306–1329)

- 1307: Eustace de Cotesbache
- 1319: William de Lindsay
- 1325: Alexander Fraser of Touchfraser and Cowie (who married Mary, the King's sister)

David II of Scotland (r. 1329–1371)

- 1329: John Baptista
- 1327-1329: Robert de Peebles
- 1329-1333: Reginald de Mure
- 1333: Sir Robert Lauder of Quarrelwood and The Bass (d. 1337) (also Justiciar of Scotia)
- 1334: William Bullock, under Edward Balliol
- 1334-1340: Reginald de Mure
- 1341-1342: William Bullock, again
- 1343-1346: John de Roxburgh
- c.1350-1357: Sir Robert de Erskine
- 1357-1358: Thomas Stewart, 2nd Earl of Angus
- 1358-1359: Thomas, Earl of Mar
- 1359-1363: Walter of Biggar
- c1363-1364: Sir Robert de Erskine, again
- 1364-1371: Walter of Biggar, again

Robert II of Scotland (r. 1371–1390)

- 1371-1376: Walter of Biggar, continues
- 1376: Michael de Monymusk, Bishop of Dunkeld
- 1377-1382: Sir John Lyon
- 1382: Robert Stewart, Earl of Fife

Robert III of Scotland (r. 1390–1406)
James I of Scotland (r. 1406–1437)

- 1424-1448: Sir John Forrester of Corstorphine, Knt.

James II of Scotland (r. 1437–1460)

- 1448-1450: James Livingston, 1st Lord Livingston
- 1450-1454: James Crichton, 2nd Lord Crichton and Earl of Moray
- 1454-1467: James Livingston, 1st Lord Livingston

James III of Scotland (r. 1460–1488)

- 1467: Robert Boyd, 1st Lord Boyd
- 1477: James Stewart, 1st Earl of Buchan
- 1483: David Lindsay, 5th Earl of Crawford

James IV of Scotland (r. 1488–1513)

- 1488: Alexander Home, 2nd Lord Home
- 1509: Alexander Home, 3rd Lord Home

James V of Scotland (r. 1513–1542)

- 1515: John Fleming, 2nd Lord Fleming (resigned 1 Aug 1524)
- 1524: Malcolm Fleming, 3rd Lord Fleming (d. 1547 at Battle of Pinkie)

Mary, Queen of Scots (r. 1542–1560)

- 1547: James Fleming, 4th Lord Fleming (d. 1558)

James VI of Scotland (r. 1560–1625)

- 1565: John Fleming, 5th Lord Fleming (d. 1572)
- 1581: Esmé Stewart, 1st Duke of Lennox
- 1594: Ludovick (or Louis) Stewart, Duke of Lennox (made heritable Chamberlains).
