= Kingarth =

Village on the Isle of Bute, Scotland

Coordinates: 55.763°N 5.036°W

Kingarth: Scottish Gaelic: Ceann a' Gharaidh
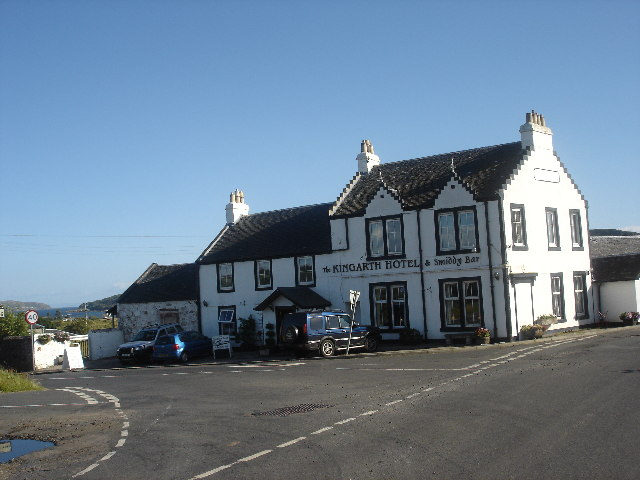
- Kingarth Hotel, Bute

- Location within Argyll and Bute
- OS grid reference: NS095563
- Civil parish: Kingarth
- Council area: Argyll and Bute
- Lieutenancy area: Argyll and Bute
- Country: Scotland
- Sovereign state: United Kingdom
- Post town: ISLE OF BUTE
- Postcode district: PA20
- Dialling code: 01700
- Police: Scotland
- Fire: Scottish
- Ambulance: Scottish
- UK Parliament: Argyll, Bute and South Lochaber
- Scottish Parliament: Argyll and Bute

Kingarth (Old Irish: Cenn Garad; Scottish Gaelic: Ceann a' Gharaidh) is a historic village and parish on the Isle of Bute, off the coast of south-western Scotland. The village is within the parish of its own name, and is situated at the junction of the A844 and B881. In the Early Middle Ages it was the site of a monastery and bishopric and the cult centre of Saints Cathan and Bláán (Anglicized: Blane).

== St Blane's Church and monastery ==
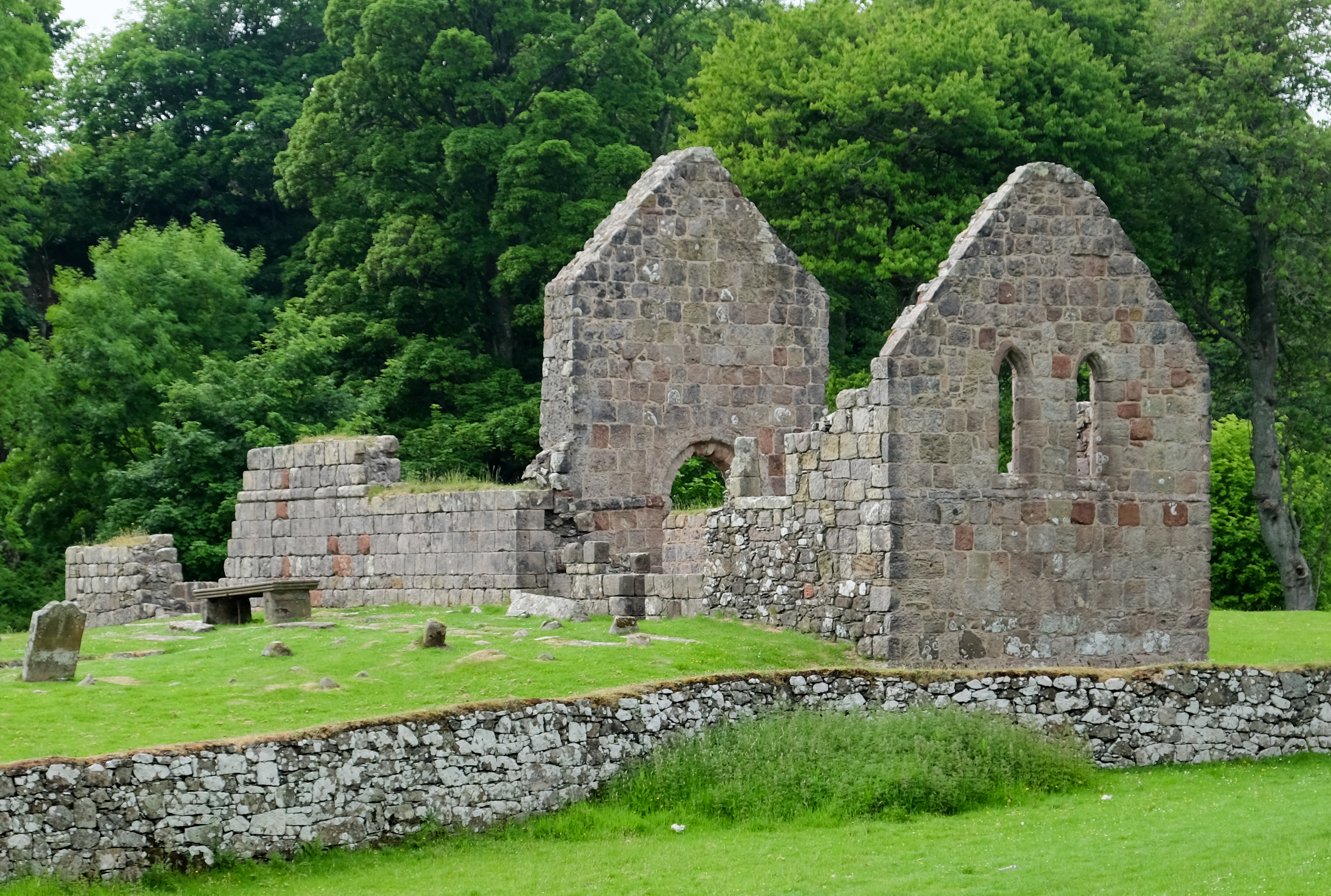
St Blane's Church 2016

Located to the north of Kilchattan Bay, Kingarth was the central religious site for the Cenél Comgaill kindred of Dál Riata (after which Cowal is named), just as Lismore was for the Cenél Loairn and Iona for the Cenél nGabráin. It is close to the southern tip of the Isle of Bute, less than 1 kilometre (0.62 mi) from the early historic hill-fort of "Little Dunagoil", which may have been the chief secular site of the kindred.

Much remains of the church ruins, located in a hollow below a south-facing slope. The remnants of the nave and the chancel are of the 12th century. In the 14th century, the building was extended, although the construction was less competent than the earlier work. The chancel arch is Romanesque in design. There are also a well and the base of a manse, which was still functioning in the 1700s.

There are two churchyards, the upper for the burial of men, and the lower for women. Some of the gravestones show fragments of decoration. In the lower churchyard are also the remains of a structure thought to have been a minor chapel. In the upper churchyard a hogback tombstone, dating to around 1000, is traditionally said to be the burial place of St Blane. It indicates that the Norsemen who inhabited the site after the abandonment of the monastery converted to Christianity. The upper churchyard also holds the grave of Sir William Macewen (1848-1924), a surgeon who lived in the area.

A structure known as the "Devil's Cauldron", with walls 2.5 metres (8 ft 2 in) thick and about 1.8 metres (5 ft 11 in) high, is thought to have been either a part of the original monastery or an older dun.

The centre for Saint Bláán's cult had probably moved to the mainland to Dunblane in Strathearn under the influence of Viking attacks in the 9th century, perhaps like the movement of the relics of Saint Cuthbert to the bishopric of Lindisfarne and those of Saint Columba to the bishopric of Dunkeld. Despite this, it survived as a religious site to become one of only two parish churches on the island, the other being Rothesay; it was part of the diocese of the Isles, though perhaps originally in the diocese of Argyll. Alan fitz Walter tried to grant the church to Paisley Abbey in 1204, but this grant does not appear to have been effective and it remained an independent parsonage until the 15th century. In 1463 it became a prebend for the newly created chapter of the diocese of the Isles, but in 1501 it was annexed to the Chapel Royal at Stirling, becoming in 1509 a prebend for the chancellorship of the Chapel Royal, the latter arrangement surviving beyond the Scottish Reformation.

== See also ==
- List of known bishops of Cenn Garad
