= Walter Stewart, 3rd High Steward of Scotland =

3rd hereditary High Steward of Scotland and Justiciar of Scotia (1198–1246)

Walter Stewart
- 3rd High Steward of Scotland
- Tenure: 1204–1246
- Predecessor: Alan fitz Walter
- Successor: Alexander Stewart
- Other names: Walter Steward of Dundonald
- Born: 1180
- Died: 1246 (aged 65–66)
- Offices: Justiciar of Scotia
- Spouse: Bethóc or Beatrix Mac Gille Críst of Angus
- Issue Detail: Alexander Stewart, 4th High Steward of Scotland; Walter Bailloch
- Father: Alan fitz Walter
- Mother: Alesta of Mar

Walter Steward of Dundonald (1180 - 1246) was 3rd hereditary High Steward of Scotland and Justiciar of Scotia.

== Life ==
He was the eldest son of Alan fitz Walter, 2nd High Steward of Scotland, by his second wife Alesta of Mar. He was the first member of the House of Stuart to use Stewart as a surname and was designated "of Dundonald".

He witnessed a charter by King Alexander II, under the designation of "Walterus filius Alani, Senescallus, Justiciar Scotiae" and it may be that seal which Nisbet described pertaining to Walter Hereditary High Steward of Scotland. Around the seal, it states "Sigill. Walteri filii Allani".

In around 1213, Walter Stewart made a grant of timber from the forest of Sanquhar for the construction of Paisley Priory.

== Family ==
Walter married Bethóc or Beatrix Mac Gille Críst of Angus, daughter of Gille Críst, Earl of Angus, by his wife, Marjorie of Huntingdon, youngest daughter of Henry of Scotland, 3rd Earl of Huntingdon, and his wife Ada de Warenne.

They were parents of:

- Alexander Stewart, 4th High Steward of Scotland, sometime Regent of Scotland.
- Sir Robert, of Tarbolten and Crookston, and Lord of Darnley.
- John, killed at Damietta in 1249, Egypt during the Seventh Crusade.
- Walter Bailloch ("the Freckled"), who married Mary de Menteith and became Earl of Menteith.
- William,
- Beatrix, married Maol Domhnaich, Earl of Lennox.
- Christian,
- Euphemia, married Adam Wallace, Laird of Riccarton.
- Margaret, married her cousin Niall, Earl of Carrick.
- Sybella, married Colin Fitzgerald, 1st Lord of Kintail.

== Bibliography ==
- Burke, Sir Bernard, Ulster King of Arms, Dormant, Abeyant, Forfeited, and Extinct Peerages, London, 1883, p. 606.
- Clay, John W., FSA., editor, The Visitation of Cambridge, 1575 and 1619 by Henery St.George, Richmond Herald, Harleian Society, London, 1897, pps: 7 - 11.
- Lauder-Frost, Gregory, F.S.A.Scot., "East Anglian Stewarts" in The Scottish Genealogist, Dec.2004, vol.LI, no.4., pps:151-161. ISSN 0300-337X
- Mackenzie, A. M., MA., D.Litt., The Rise of the Stewarts, London, 1935, pps.10-11.
- Miller, James, The History of Dunbar, Dunbar, 1830, p. 18.

Court offices
Preceded by Alan Fitzwalter	High Steward of Scotland; 1204–1246	Succeeded by Alexander Stewart
Legal offices
Preceded by William Comyn	Justiciar of Scotia; 1233–1241	Succeeded by Philip de Melville and Robert de Monte Alto
