= Walter Stewart, 6th High Steward of Scotland =

Scottish soldier (c. 1296 – 1327)

Walter Stewart
- 6th High Steward of Scotland
- Coat of arms of High Steward of Scotland
- Born: c. 1296
- Died: 9 April 1327; Bathgate Castle
- Noble family: House of Stewart
- Spouses: Marjorie Bruce (m. 1315; died 1316) Isabel de Graham
- Issue: King Robert II of Scotland
- Father: James Stewart, 5th High Steward of Scotland
- Mother: Giles de Burgh

Walter Stewart (c. 1296 – 9 April 1327) was the 6th Hereditary High Steward of Scotland and was the father of King Robert II of Scotland, the first Stewart monarch.

== Origins ==
The eldest son and heir of James Stewart, 5th High Steward of Scotland (c. 1260-1309) by his third wife Giles (Latinised to Egidia) de Burgh, a daughter of the Irish nobleman Walter de Burgh, 1st Earl of Ulster.

== Career ==
At the age of 21 Walter fought against the English at the Battle of Bannockburn in 1314 where according to some sources, together with Douglas he commanded the left wing of the Scots' army, but according to other sources was (due to his youth and inexperience) merely the nominal leader of one of the four (or three) Scottish schiltrons, the effective leader being his cousin James Douglas, Lord of Douglas.

For his services at Bannockburn, Walter was appointed Warden of the Western Marches and was rewarded with a grant of the lands of Largs, which had been forfeited by King John Balliol. In 1316 Stewart donated those lands to Paisley Abbey.

Following the liberation of King Robert the Bruce's wife, Elizabeth de Burgh, and daughter, Marjorie, from their long captivity in England in October 1314, Walter the High Steward was sent to receive them at the Anglo-Scottish Border and conduct them back to the Scottish royal court. Soon after, in 1315, he married Marjorie, receiving the Barony of Bathgate in Linlithgowshire as part of his wife's dowry.

During the absence of King Robert the Bruce in Ireland, Walter the High Steward and Sir James Douglas managed government affairs and spent much time defending the Scottish Borders. Upon the capture of Berwick-upon-Tweed from the English in 1318 he took command of the town which subsequently on 24 July 1319 was besieged by King Edward II of England. Several of the siege engines were destroyed by the Scots' garrison whereupon Walter the Steward suddenly rushed in force from the walled town to drive off the enemy. In 1322, with Douglas and Thomas Randolph, he made an attempt to surprise the English king at Byland Abbey, near Malton in Yorkshire, but Edward escaped, pursued towards York by Walter the Steward and 500 horsemen.

Around 1320/26, Walter, Steward of Scotland, granted by charter to John St. Clair, his valet, the lands of Maxton, Roxburghshire, one of the witnesses being Roberto de Lauwedir tunc justiciario Laudonie ("Robert de Lauder, then Justiciar of Lothian").

== Marriages and children ==
He married twice:

- Firstly in 1315 to Princess Marjorie, the only daughter of King Robert I of Scotland by his first wife Isabella of Mar. Marjorie died in March 1316 giving birth to their only child:
  - King Robert II of Scotland (born 1316-died 1390), the first monarch of the House of Stewart who reigned as King of Scotland from 1371 to his death in 1390.
- Secondly he married Isabel de Graham, believed to have been a daughter of Sir John Graham of Abercorn, by whom he had three further children:
  - John Stewart of Ralston.
  - Sir Andrew Stewart, knight.
  - Egidia Stewart, who married three times: firstly to Sir James Lindsay of Crawford Castle (had issue); secondly to Sir Hugh Eglinton (?); and thirdly to Sir James Douglas of Dalkeith (had issue).

== Death and burial ==
He died on 9 April 1327 at Bathgate Castle and was buried in the Abbey Church of Paisley, alongside his first wife, Marjorie Bruce, and his five High Steward ancestors. A memorial on the wall of the Abbey is inscribed as follows:

In everlasting memory of the High Stewards of Scotland. Here rest their bodies where stood the high altar of this Abbey Church of Paisley.

Court offices
Preceded by James Stewart	High Steward of Scotland; 1309–1327	Succeeded by Robert II of Scotland
