= Alexander de Baliol =

Scottish politician

- Coat of arms as Lord of Cavers; Argent, an orle gules

Chamberlain of Scotland
- In office 1287–1294
- Preceded by: John de Lindsay

Personal details
- Born: c.1246
- Died: c.1309

Alexander de Baliol (fl. 1246?–1309?), Baron Balliol, Lord of Cavers was an Anglo-Scottish noble. He served at one time as Chamberlain of Scotland.

== Life ==
Alexander was a member of the Baliol family, about whose pedigree confusion exists. Alexander de Baliol the Scottish chamberlain appears as Dominus de Cavers in the Scottish records in 1270. Seven years later he was commissioned, as lord of Cavers, to serve in Edward's Welsh wars.

As Alexandre de Balens, Balliol's arms appear in a roll of Scottish knights who took part in a grand tournament held for Louis IX of France at Compiègne.

He later participated in the Eighth Crusade along with Adam of Kilconquhar, then in the Lord Edward's crusade with his uncle Eustace de Balliol.

In 1284, under the same designation of Dominus de Cavers, he was one of the Scottish barons who bound themselves to receive Margaret, the Maid of Norway, as queen in the event of failure of male issue of Alexander III. In the same year he received a summons to attend Edward's army, so that he must still have retained English fiefs.

In 1287, he is for the first time mentioned in a writ by the guardians of Scotland as chamberlain of Scotland, an office in which he succeeded John Lindsay, Bishop of Glasgow. Two years later he took part in the negotiations which resulted in the Treaty of Salisbury, 6 November 1289, confirmed by the parliament at Birgham, 12 March 1290, by which Edward the Prince of Wales was to marry Margaret and Edward I solemnly recognised the independence of Scotland. Her death prevented the marriage, and Edward soon forgot or ignored his engagements.

On 5 June 1291, Baliol and his wife Isabella de Chilham, widow of David de Strathbogie, Earl of Atholl, received a letter of attorney and safe conduct from Edward permitting them to remain for a year in Scotland. He still continued to hold the office of chamberlain after the seisin of Scotland had been given to Edward I, as the condition of his determining the suit as to the succession of the crown of Scotland; but in the beginning of 1292 Robert Heron, rector of Ford, was associated with Baliol in this office. On 30 December 1292, certain of the records of Scotland which had been in the hands of Edward were redelivered to Alexander Baliol as chamberlain of Scotland.

Baliol is last mentioned as chamberlain on 16 May 1294; disputes between Edward and John Baliol may have led to his deprivation by the English king after, or perhaps even before, the campaign of 1296, when Edward forced John Baliol to resign the crown and carried him captive to England. In 1297, John de Sandale, an English baron, appears as chamberlain of Scotland. Alexander having been captured at the Battle of Dunbar on 27 April 1296 and was only released upon agreeing to serve Edward I in a campaign in Flanders.

From entries in the accounts of the expenses of John Baliol when a prisoner in England with reference to a horse of Alexander de Baliol, it would seem that he shared the captivity of his kinsman. On 13 January 1297, Edward made a presentation to the church of Cavers, upon the ground that the lands of Alexander de Baliol were in his hands. A few scanty notices between 1298 and 1301 indicate that he took part on the English side in the war with Scotland; and from one of these we learn that he had manors in Kent, the wood of which he received the king's licence to sell.

Alexander Baliol was amongst the barons present, under Edward I, at the siege of Caerlaverock in 1300. In 1303, he seems to have shown signs of again falling off from the English side, since his chattels in Kent, Hertfordshire, and Roxburghshire were in that year seized by John de Bretagne, Earl of Richmond, in the Scottish campaign. His estates in Kent, of which the chief was the castle and manor of Chilham, were held by him in right of his wife Isabella de Chilham, by whom he left three sons, Alexander, Thomas and William.

The date of his death is unknown, but as he was summoned to all the parliaments of Edward I between 1300 and 1307, and is not mentioned as summoned to any of Edward II, he probably died soon after the accession.

== Bibliography ==
- Hurlock, Kathryn (2012). Britain, Ireland and the Crusades, C.1000-1300. Macmillan International Higher Education. ISBN 9781137292735.
