= Reginald de Mure =

Reginald de Mure Lord Chamberlain of Scotland Lord of Cowdams, Cameskan and Abercorn
- Spouse: Sybilla Graham
- Children: William de Mure; Gilchrist de Mure; Alicia de Mure
- Family: de Mure

Reginald de Mure (died 1340) Lord of Cowdams, Cameskan and Abercorn was a Scottish noble. He was the Lord Chamberlain of Scotland between 1329 and 1333 and between 1334 and 1340.

Mure received the Abercorn estate upon his marriage to Sybilla de Graham. He was appointed as Chamberlain of Scotland to King David II of Scotland, serving from 1329 to 1333. Granted the lands of Tullibardine, after the forfeiture of Andrew Murray of Tullibardine in 1333, for supporting Edward Balliol, the lands appear to have been restored to the Murray family in 1341. He was again serving as Chamberlain of Scotland between 1334 and 1340. Mure was appointed as one of the commissioners to treat with the English, of a truce. He died in 1340.

== Issue ==
Reginald married Sybilla, daughter of John de Graham of Dalkeith, Abercorn & Eskdale and his wife Isabella, they are known to have had the following issue.

- William de Mure of Abercorn, died without male issue. His daughter Christina married John Lindsay of Byres, passing Abercorn into the Lindsay family.
- Gilchrist de Mure of Cowdams, had issue.
- Alicia de Mure, married firstly William de Herch and secondly John Stewart of Ralston, had issue.

== Citations ==
| Preceded by Robert de Peebles | Chamberlain of Scotland; 1329-1333 | Succeeded by Robert de Lawedre |
| Preceded by William Bullock | Chamberlain of Scotland; 1334-1340 | Succeeded by William Bullock |
