= Alan fitz Walter, 2nd High Steward of Scotland =

Hereditary High Steward of Scotland and crusader (1120-1204)

Alan fitz Walter
- 2nd High Steward of Scotland
- Alan's seal
- Tenure: 1177–1204
- Predecessor: Walter fitz Alan
- Successor: Walter Stewart, 3rd High Steward of Scotland
- Born: 1120
- Died: 1204 (aged 83–84)
- Spouses: Eva; Alesta of Mar
- Issue Detail: Walter Stewart, 3rd High Steward of Scotland
- Father: Walter fitz Alan
- Mother: Eschina de Londres

Alan fitz Walter (1120 – 1204) was hereditary High Steward of Scotland and a crusader.

== Life ==
Alan was the son and heir of Walter fitz Alan. From 1178, the time of his succession to his father, until he died in 1204, Alan served as Steward of Scotland (dapifer) to William the Lion, King of Scots. It was during Alan's lifetime that his family acquired the Isle of Bute. He was possibly responsible for the erection of Rothesay Castle on the island.

Alan allegedly accompanied Richard the Lionheart on the Third Crusade, from which he returned to Scotland in July 1191. None of the references, however, can be traced back to the period.

A Royal Grant to Kinloss Abbey, signed at Melrose Abbey was made between 1179 and 1183. Amongst the witnesses are the Abbot of Melrose, the Abbot of Newbottle, Richard de Morville, Constable of Scotland, 'Alan, son of Walter the Steward, and William de Lauder.

Alan became a patron of the Knights Templar and is responsible for expanding Templar influence in Scotland. There is no evidence, however, that he joined the Order before his death.

He appears as a witness to other charters of William The Lion.

Shortly before he died in 1204, Alan gifted the custody and revenues of the parish of Kingarth, which covered all of Bute, to Paisley Priory.

He is buried with his father in Paisley Abbey.

== Marriage and issue ==
He married firstly, Eva, who is usually named as the daughter of Sweyn Thor'sson, although some historians dispute Eva's parentage. They had no known issue.

By his second marriage to Alesta of Mar, daughter of Morggán, Earl of Mar, and Ada, he had:

- David, died without issue, before his father
- Walter Stewart, 3rd High Steward of Scotland, married Bethóc or Beatrix, daughter of Gille Críst, Earl of Angus, and his wife Marjorie of Huntingdon. He died in 1246.
- Leonard FitzAlan
- Avelina (FitzAlan) (Paisley, 1171-?), married Donnchadh, Earl of Carrick
- Eupheme Stewart

== Notes ==
Alan fitz Walter, 2nd High Steward of Scotland House of Stuart Born: 1140 Died: 1204
Court offices
Preceded by Walter Fitzalan	High Steward of Scotland c. 1177 – c. 1204	Succeeded by Walter Óg
