= Alexander Stewart, 4th High Steward of Scotland =

High Steward of Scotland

Alexander Stewart
- 4th High Steward of Scotland
- Coat of arms of Stewart, High Stewards of Scotland: Or, a fess chequy argent and azure. The fess is an allusion to the chequered tablecloth used by the High Steward in the Court of Exchequer for counting money.
- Tenure: 1246–1282
- Predecessor: Walter Stewart, 3rd High Steward of Scotland
- Successor: James Stewart, 5th High Steward of Scotland
- Born: c. 1214
- Died: 1283
- Issue Detail: James Stewart, 5th High Steward of Scotland
- Father: Walter Stewart, 3rd High Steward of Scotland
- Mother: Béthoc (Beatrix) Mac Gille Críst

Alexander Stewart (c. 1214 – 1283), known as Alexander of Dundonald, was a Scottish magnate who in 1241 succeeded his father as hereditary High Steward of Scotland.

== Origins ==
He was the son of Walter Stewart, 3rd High Steward of Scotland.

== Career ==
He fought on the Seventh Crusade under King Louis IX of France, during which his younger brother John was killed at Damietta in Egypt in 1249. He also seems to have made a pilgrimage to Santiago de Compostela in Spain and in honour of the saint baptised his eldest surviving son James, a name rare before then in Scotland. In 1255 he appears as one of the Regents of Scotland during the minority of King Alexander III. He commanded the Scottish army at Largs in October 1263, successfully defending Scotland against attempted invasion by King Haakon IV of Norway. It appears to have been in his time that the Stewarts acquired the lordship of the Cowal Peninsula, with their castle at Dunoon. He is recorded as playing a prominent part in affairs during the reign of Alexander, being referred to as senescallus Scotie (steward of Scotland) instead of the older dapifer regis Scotie (steward of the king of Scotland), so indicating that he held a major office of state that was significant nationally rather than just being a courtier in the royal household.

He died in 1283, and was succeeded by his son James.

== Family ==
His wife is said to have been named Jean, and they had four documented children:

- James Stewart, 5th High Steward of Scotland
- Sir John Stewart of Bonkyll
- Elizabeth Stewart, who married Sir William le Hardi, Lord of Douglas.
- Hawise Stewart, who married John de Soules

== Bibliography ==
- Lauder-Frost, Gregory, F.S.A.Scot., "East Anglian Stewarts" in The Scottish Genealogist, Dec.2004, vol.LI, no.4., pps:151-161. ISSN 0300-337X
- MacEwen, ABW (2011). "The Wives of Sir James the Steward (d.1309)". Foundations. 3 (5): 391–398.
- Sellar, WDH (2000). "Hebridean Sea Kings: The Successors of Somerled, 1164–1316". In Cowan, EJ; McDonald, RA (eds.). Alba: Celtic Scotland in the Middle Ages. East Linton: Tuckwell Press. pp. 187–218. ISBN 1-86232-151-5.
- Nisbet, Alexander, 1722. Vol.1, p. 48; and appendix, page 149.
- Burke, Messrs., John and John Bernard, The Royal Families of England, Scotland, and Wales, and Their Descendants &c., volume 2, London, 1851, p. xlii.
- Anderson, William, "The Scottish Nation", Edinburgh, 1867, vol.vii, p. 200.
- Mackenzie, A. M., MA., D.Litt., The Rise of the Stewarts, London, 1935, pp. 13–14.
- The Marquis de Ruvigny & Raineval, The Jacobite Peerage &c., London & Edinburgh (1904), 1974 reprint, p. 8n. Agnatic ancestor of British kings.

Alexander Stewart, 4th High Steward of Scotland House of Stewart Born: 1214 Died: 1283
Peerage of Scotland
Preceded by Walter Stewart	High Steward of Scotland; 1246–1283	Succeeded by James Stewart
