= Prince and Great Steward of Scotland =

British royal family title

Arms of the Duke of Rothesay, Earl of Carrick, Prince and Great Steward of Scotland, Lord of the Isles' as used in Scotland, based on "His Royal Highness's Scottish Banner", designed in 1974 by Sir Iain Moncreiffe, Albany Herald: Quarterly 1 & 4: Or, a fess chequy argent and azure (Great Steward of Scotland (arms of Clan Stewart)); 2 & 3: Argent, a galley sable (Lord of the Isles) overall an inescutcheon of the royal arms of Scotland with a label of three points azure (Duke of Rothesay, being the arms of the King of Scotland differenced for an eldest son).

Prince and Great Steward of Scotland (Scottish Gaelic: Prionnsa agus Mòr-stiùbhard na h-Alba; Scots: Prince an Great Stewart o Scotland) is one of the titles of the heir apparent to the British throne. The holder since 8 September 2022 is Prince William, who bears the other Scottish titles of Duke of Rothesay, Earl of Carrick, Lord of the Isles and Baron of Renfrew.

== Principality of Scotland ==
The Principality of Scotland originated in a time when Scotland was a separate kingdom prior to entering a political union with England in 1707. The title was held as an appanage by the heir apparent to the Scottish throne, and is still vested in the heir apparent to the British throne. In addition to being Prince and Great Steward of Scotland, the heir apparent is also Duke of Rothesay, Earl of Carrick, Baron of Renfrew, and Lord of the Isles.

In modern times, the prince remains paramount superior in these lands (whilst the Crown serves this role in the rest of Scotland). The Abolition of Feudal Tenure etc. (Scotland) Act 2000, however, abolished most remaining feudal duties and privileges attaching to the principality, leaving the prince's status as mainly titular. Before the 2000 Act, the principality was entirely feued out to tenants and brought in a small income. All title deeds in Ayrshire and Renfrewshire are required to be sealed with the prince's seal. Revenue gained from feudal dealings was counted as income for the Duchy of Cornwall, a more substantial estate also held by the monarch's eldest son, who is heir apparent.

== Great Steward ==
Arms of Stewart, Hereditary Grand Steward of Scotland: Or, a fess chequy argent and azure, adopted at the start of the age of heraldry, c.1200-1215. Part of the High Steward's role was managing the King's finances, the accounting for which was performed on a chequered cloth (as in the Exchequer in England) to help them count coins, hence the fess chequy

The Great Steward of Scotland, also known as the High Steward of Scotland, is an officer who controls the domestic affairs of a royal household. In the 12th century King David I of Scotland gave the title to Walter fitz Alan, a nobleman from Brittany, whose descendants adopted the surname "Steward", later "Stewart" and later founded the royal House of Stewart. A junior branch of the Stewart family descended from the younger son of Alexander Stewart, 4th High Steward of Scotland (d.1283), namely "Stewart of Darnley", paternal ancestors of King James I & VI, lived for several generations in France, when the name became spelt in the French manner "Stuart" and "Dernelé". In 1371 Robert Stewart, 7th High Steward of Scotland inherited the throne of Scotland via his mother and became King Robert II of Scotland, when the title or office of High Steward of Scotland merged into the crown. However it was re-granted by the monarch to his elder son and heir apparent, together with the titles Duke of Rothesay (created 1398), Baron of Renfrew (created 1404), Earl of Carrick (created 1186) and Lord of the Isles (created c. 875). Thus, currently, the Prince of Wales is Great Steward of Scotland, sometimes known as the Prince and Great Steward of Scotland.

== Use of titles ==
Since James VI also became the King of England and Ireland in 1603, the titles have fallen from habitual use; the holder from then on usually also being Duke of Cornwall, Prince of Wales and Duke of Rothesay, which were preferred, and is now seldom referred to, except as the last in the conventional list of the Prince of Wales's titles.

Similar to the process of Crown consent, Parliament shall not debate whether a bill affecting (directly or by implication) the personal property or interests of the Prince and Great Steward of Scotland be passed or approved unless such consent to those provisions has been signified at a meeting of the Parliament. In the Scottish Parliament, such consent is signified by a member of the Scottish Government.

== High Stewards of Scotland, c. 1150–present ==
- Walter Fitz-Alan, 1st High Steward of Scotland c. 1150–1177
- Alan Fitzwalter, 2nd High Steward of Scotland 1177–1204
- Walter Stewart, 3rd High Steward of Scotland 1204–1246
- Alexander Stewart, 4th High Steward of Scotland 1246–1283
- James Stewart, 5th High Steward of Scotland 1283–1309
- Walter Stewart, 6th High Steward of Scotland 1309–1327
- Robert Stewart, 7th High Steward of Scotland (Robert II of Scotland) 1327–1371
- John Stewart, 8th High Steward of Scotland (Robert III of Scotland) c. 1371–1390
- David Stewart, Duke of Rothesay 1398–1402
- James Stewart, Duke of Rothesay (James I of Scotland) 1402–1406
- Alexander Stewart, Duke of Rothesay 1430
- James Stewart, Duke of Rothesay (James II of Scotland) 1430–1437
- James Stewart, Duke of Rothesay (James III of Scotland) 1453–1460
- James Stewart, Duke of Rothesay (James IV of Scotland) 1473–1488
- James Stewart, Duke of Rothesay 1507–1508
- Arthur Stewart, Duke of Rothesay 1509–1510
- James Stewart, Duke of Rothesay (James V of Scotland) 1512–1513
- James Stewart, Duke of Rothesay 1540–1541
- James Stuart, Duke of Rothesay (James VI & I) 1566–1567
- Henry Frederick Stuart, Duke of Rothesay 1594–1612
- Charles Stuart, Duke of Rothesay (Charles I) 1612–1625
- Charles Stuart, Duke of Rothesay (Charles II) 1630–1649
- James Francis Edward Stuart, Duke of Rothesay 1688–1702
- George Augustus, Duke of Rothesay (George II) 1714–1727
- Frederick Louis, Duke of Rothesay 1727–1751
- George, Duke of Rothesay (George IV) 1762–1820
- Albert Edward, Duke of Rothesay (Edward VII) 1841–1901
- George, Duke of Rothesay (George V) 1901–1910
- Edward, Duke of Rothesay (Edward VIII) 1910–1936
- Charles, Duke of Rothesay (Charles III) 1952–2022
- William, Duke of Rothesay 2022–present
