= James Stewart, 5th High Steward of Scotland =

Guardian of Scotland during the First Interregnum (1260–1309)

James Stewart
- 5th High Steward of Scotland
- Coat of arms of the High Steward of Scotland: Or, a fess chequy argent and azure
- Born: c. 1260
- Died: 16 July 1309
- Noble family: Stewart
- Spouses: Cecilia of Dunbar; Muriel of Strathearn; Egidia de Burgh
- Issue Detail: Walter Stewart, 6th High Steward of Scotland
- Father: Alexander Stewart, 4th High Steward of Scotland

James Stewart (c. 1260 – 16 July 1309) was the 5th Hereditary High Steward of Scotland and a Guardian of Scotland during the First Interregnum (1286–1292).

== Origins ==
He was the eldest surviving son of Alexander Stewart, 4th High Steward of Scotland (d. 1283), by his wife of unknown identity. The date of his birth is not known and some sources have placed it, on no good evidence, as early as 1243. This is now thought to be unlikely, for the following reasons. Firstly, James's father is known to have planned a pilgrimage to the shrine of Saint James of Compostella in 1252 or after, so James would probably have been born after this, and named in honour of that saint. Secondly, James's Christian name was unusual, then uncommon in Scotland and not a traditional name in the Stewart family where Walter and Alan were favoured. It is therefore quite possible that he was not Alexander's eldest son, but the eldest surviving son. For these reasons, and also the fact of his son and successor Walter Stewart, 6th High Steward of Scotland being described in about 1314 as a "beardless lad" by John Barbour in his poem The Brus, it is proposed that James was born in about 1260.

== Career ==
In 1286, James was chosen as one of the six Guardians of Scotland. He subsequently submitted to King Edward I of England on 9 July 1297 and was one of the auditors for the competitor, Robert Bruce, 5th Lord of Annandale. However, during the Wars of Scottish Independence, he joined Sir William Wallace. After Wallace's defeat at the Battle of Falkirk in 1298, he gave his support to Robert Bruce, later King Robert I of Scotland, grandson of the competitor.

In 1302, with six other ambassadors including John Comyn II of Badenoch, he had been sent to solicit the aid of the French king against King Edward. After the victory of England against Scotland, Stewart would be compelled to swear fealty to King Edward again at Lanercost Priory on 23 October 1306. To render his oath inviolable, it was taken upon the two crosses of Scotland most esteemed for their sanctity, on the consecrated host, the holy gospels and on various relics of saints and he agreed to submit to instant excommunication if he should break his allegiance to Edward. However, convinced that his faith was primarily to his country despite all, he once again took up the Scottish patriotic cause and died in the service of Robert the Bruce in 1309.

== Marriages and issue ==
He married several times:

- Firstly to Cecilia, a daughter of Patrick III, Earl of Dunbar (died 1289);
- Secondly, apparently to Muriel (born 1244), a daughter of Malise II, Earl of Strathearn (died 1271);
- Thirdly to Egidia, a daughter of the Irish nobleman Walter de Burgh, 1st Earl of Ulster (died 1271), by whom he had issue:
  - Walter Stewart, 6th High Steward of Scotland (1296–1327), eldest surviving son and heir, who married Marjorie Bruce, daughter of King Robert I. His son was King Robert II of Scotland, the first Stewart monarch.
  - Egidia Stewart, who married Sir Alexander de Menzies, of Durisdeer.

His other issue, by wives uncertain, include:

  - Sir John Stewart, killed 14 October 1318 at the Battle of Dundalk;
  - Sir Andrew Stewart, a "younger son", who married the daughter of James Bethe (or Beith) and was decorated with a military sword-belt by King John II of France (1350–1364);
  - Sir James Stewart of Durisdeer, in 1327 the tutor to his nephew the future King Robert II of Scotland;

Peerage of Scotland
Preceded by Alexander Stewart	High Steward of Scotland; 1283–1309	Succeeded by Walter Stewart
