= Kilbride Castle =

Former castle in South Lanarkshire, Scotland

- East Kilbride, South Lanarkshire, Scotland
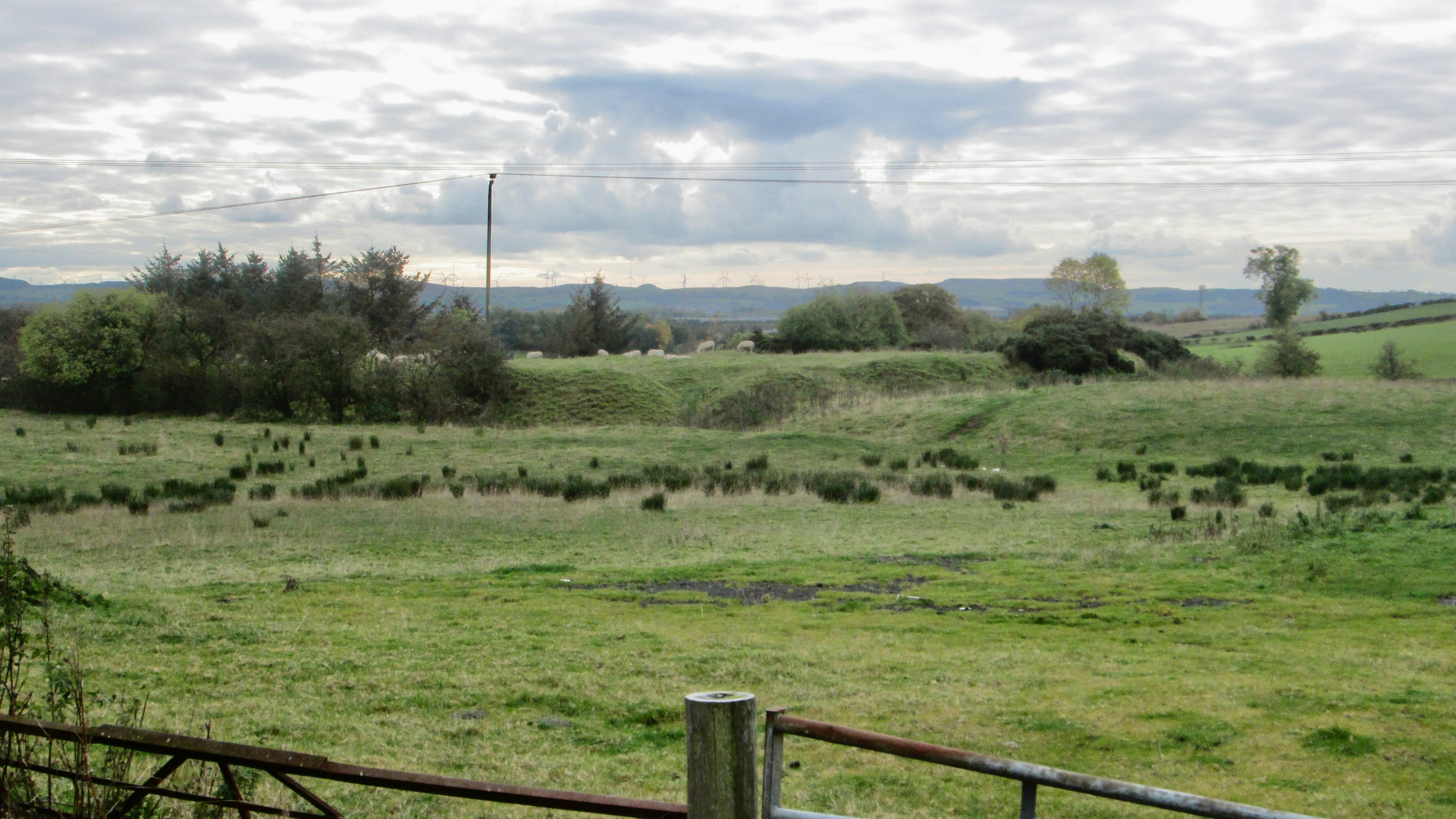
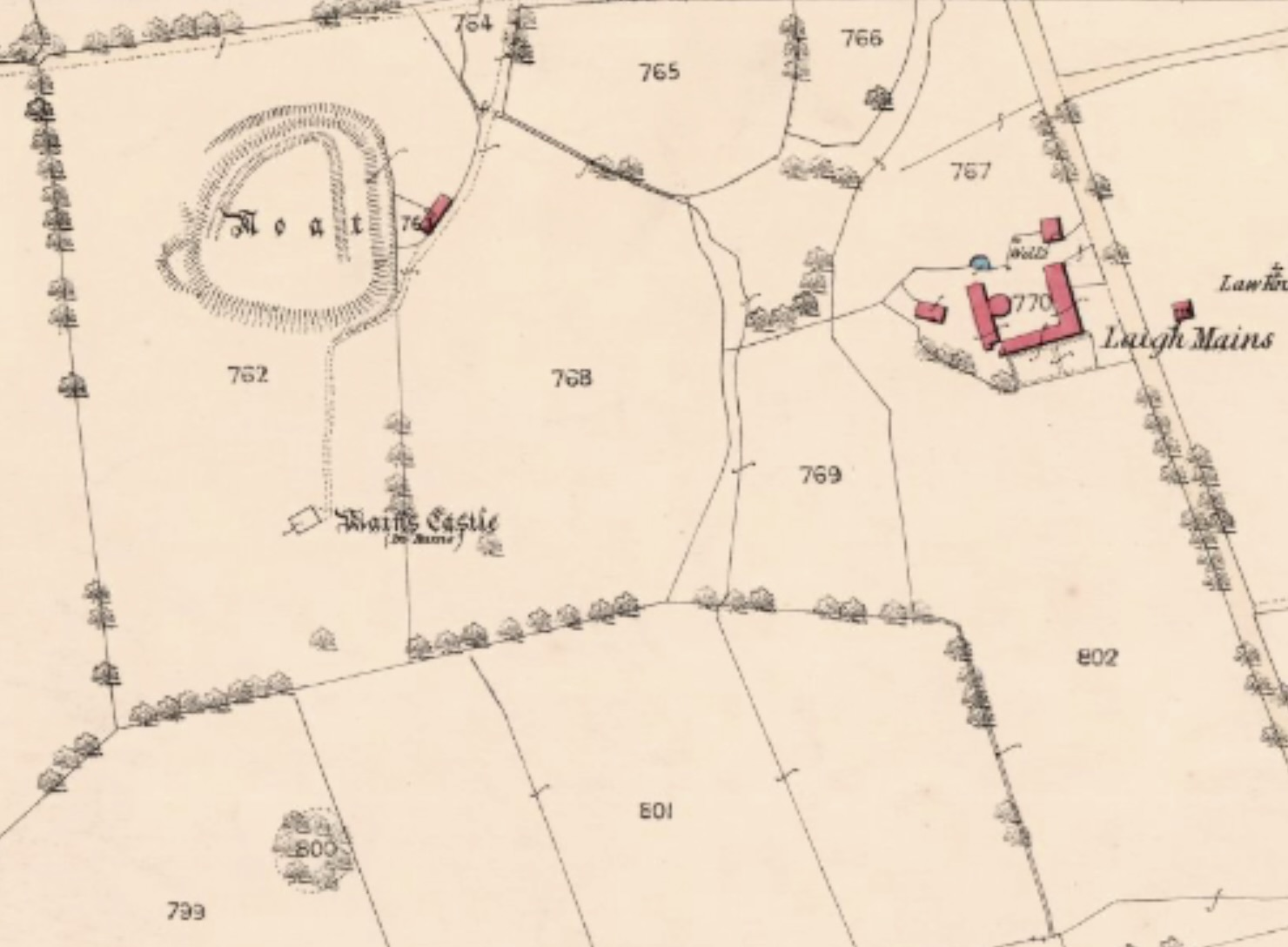
- Sheep on flat top of motte, seen from High Mains farm 1857 map; motte, Mains Castle, Laigh Mains farm.

Location
- Coordinates: 55°46′45″N 4°11′22″W

Site history
- Built: 12th century

Kilbride Castle was a Norman castle of the Lords of Kilbride held by the de Valognes family, which became a seat of the Comyn family and has also been called Comyn's Castle. Robert the Bruce awarded it to Walter Stewart, subsequently Robert II of Scotland granted it to the Lindsay family of Dunrod Castle, Inverkip.

In 1793, historian David Ure identified the castle's site as Laigh Mains motte, located just to the north of the later Mains Castle in the parish of East Kilbride, South Lanarkshire, Scotland.

== Laigh Mains Motte ==
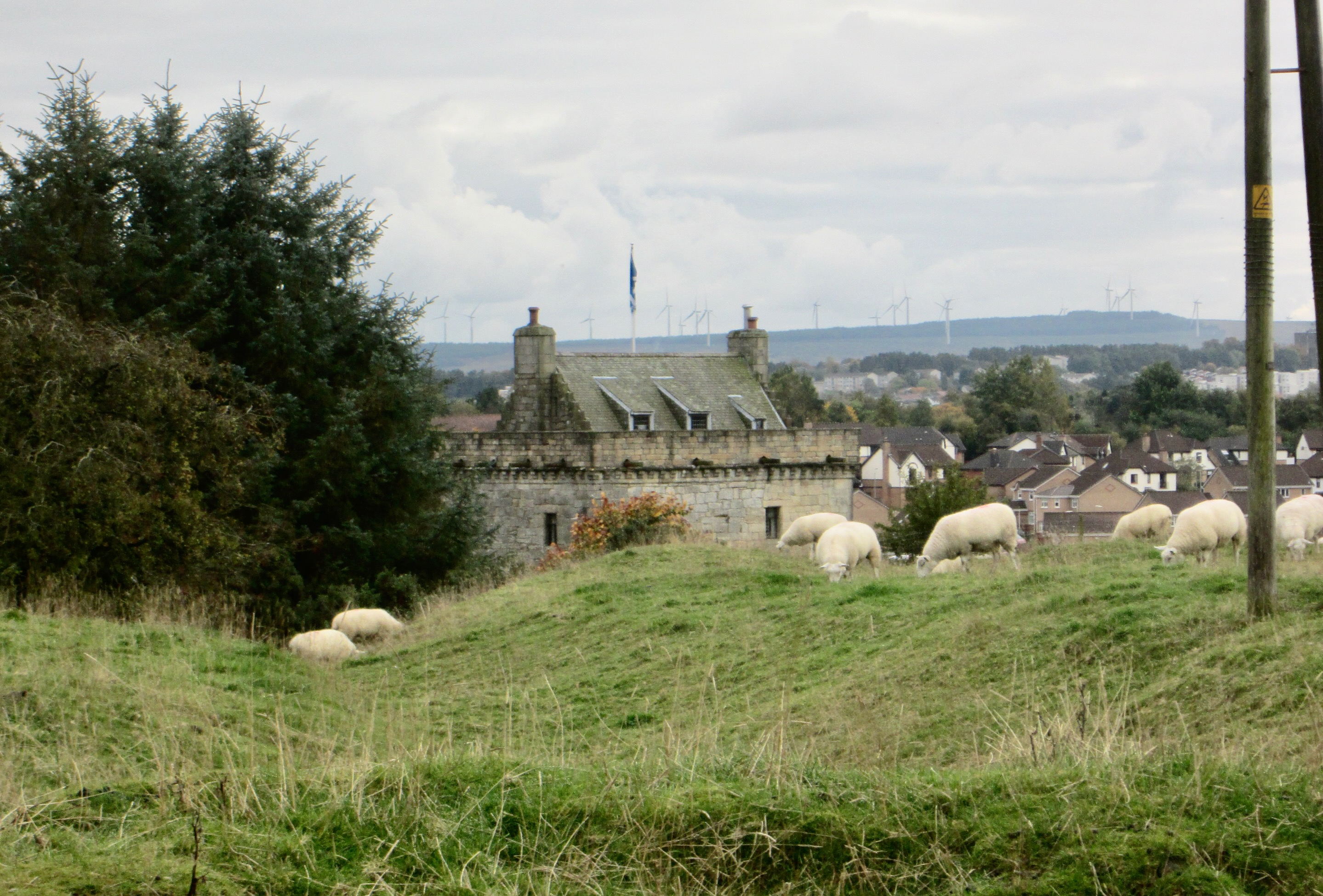
Laigh Mains Motte at south end of inner ditch, view over Mains Castle roof

The earthworks forming Laigh Mains Motte are in the grounds of Laigh Mains farm, on the west side of Markethill Road which leads north from East Kilbride. Access is by a lane which is the farm's northern boundary with High Mains farm. The motte forms a raised flattened area projecting at the brow of a south facing slope, giving defence against attackers on its south and east. A double ditch protected the east and north sides, but the outer north ditch has been filled in for farming activities.

== History ==
Kilbride was one of numerous early medieval settlements named for a cell or chapel dedicated to Saint Brigid of Kildare. The castle was sited 1.1 miles (1.8 km) north of the church. The form of the motte is atypical, it may predate the 11th or 12th century.

=== de Valognes (Valoniis) ===
Norman noble Peter de Valognes, a chief commander in William's 1066 conquest of England, was rewarded with numerous lordships spread across several counties. In 1072, William achieved peace with King Malcolm III of Scotland at the Treaty of Abernethy. The de Valognes family of Peter and his wife Albreda had six sons; Robert, Philip, Geoffrey, John, and Roger. The estates were inherited by Robert, whose daughter married Robert Fitzwalter; their daughter and heiress Christian married the 3rd Earl of Essex, becoming the countess of Essex.

The Davidian Revolution extended feudalism into Scotland, bringing in Anglo-Norman knights, at some time before the end of 1165 the brothers Philip de Valognes and Roger went there together. Their family name is shown in The Scots Peerage as Valoniis. With support from king William the Lion, Philip became the first hereditary Chamberlain of Scotland. He was granted the lands of Panmure and Benvie. These, and the position of Chamberlain, were passed on to his son William.

Roger de Valognes became the first Lord of Kilbride. His claim to the church and its land rights was disputed around 1180 by Bishop Jocelin of Glasgow. William the Lion's court accepted testimony that the church's rights dated from John Capellanus becoming the first Bishop of Glasgow. By 1189 Roger withdrew his claim, and Bishop Jocelin granted the family rights to a private chapel in Kilbride Castle. Farms to the north of High Mains farm are named East and West Rogerton after Roger de Valonis.

Roger married, his daughter Isabella was his sole heir. She also inherited a share of the estates of the countess of Essex, granddaughter of Roger's brother Robert.

=== Comyn ===
The Scoto-Norman Comyn family increased its power and influence during the 13th century, a grouping with Buchan and Badenoch branches. William Comyn, Lord of Badenoch and Earl of Buchan, had a younger son who married Isabel de Valoniis before 1215, and gained this important lordship as David Comyn, Lord of Kilbride, making the Comyns of Kilbride the third branch of the closely linked family. David was a signatory to the 1237 Treaty of York which established the Anglo-Scottish border. He died in 1247, his widow Isabel paid homage to Henry III of England who gave her seizin of her lands in Northumberland, Northampton, Norfolk, Suffolk, Essex, and Hertford.

The lands in both Scotland and England were inherited by their son William Comyn, Lord of Kilbride, who married Euphemia de Clavering, and had two sons. John, the eldest, inherited the lordship in 1283, but allegedly fled. In 1290 the younger son Edmund Comyn became Lord of Kilbride, as well as becoming Lord of the lands in England including Fakenham Magna in Suffolk.

Under Alexander III of Scotland, Comyn landholdings had increased, with castles at Kirkintilloch, Lenzie, and Dalswinton. They gained political dominance as sheriffs and Justiciars of Scotland. As establishment Guardians of Scotland they negotiated with Edward I of England, and the 1290 Treaty of Birgham affirmed "the rights, laws, liberties and customs of the realm of Scotland be preserved in every respect and in all time coming". Competition for the vacant throne of Scotland brought an outsider bid from Robert V de Brus. To avoid civil war, the Guardians asked Edward to arbitrate, under his direct rule between June 1291 and November 1292 Scottish castles were surrendered to him. John Balliol was made king of Scotland, but was ineffective. In 1295 a Council of leaders made a treaty with France. Edward massed forces on the border near Berwick, in March 1296 John Comyn, Earl of Buchan, other earls and John, the Red Comyn, attacked the English castle at Carlisle where Edward had made Robert VI de Brus Constable. The English invasion overwhelmingly won the Battle of Dunbar, and Scottish leaders including John and Edmund Comyn of Kilbride were imprisoned in England.

Edward granted liberty to imprisoned barons provided they served in his wars against France. The Scots in Edward's Flanders campaign were led by Edmund Comyn of Kilbride but in 1298, along with the Red Comyn, he deserted and asked the French king for help. They fought Edward's forces in the 1303 Battle of Roslin, together with Simon Fraser.

=== Stewart and Lindsay ===
Robert the Bruce was supported by the barons Roger de Kirkpatrick of Closeburn, and James de Lindsay of Dunrod, north of Inverkip. In 1306 Bruce went with them to the chapel of Greyfriars, Dumfries, leaving them outside during a quarrel in which he killed John, the Red Comyn. Bruce was made king, and confiscated the Comyn estates. He granted the castle and lands of Kilbride as dowry to his son in law, Walter Stewart, who married Bruce's daughter in 1315.

In 1382, King Robert II of Scotland granted John Lindsay of Dunrod (the successor to James) "the barony of Kilbryde, and the lands of Kittochsyde, Thorntoun, &e., extending to 'ane hundred merk land,' in Clydesdale, for his good and faithful services". The Lindsays of Dunrod kept their title and old property, but "preferring the Mains to Dunrode, their ancient family-seat, near Gourock, took up their residence in Kilbride."

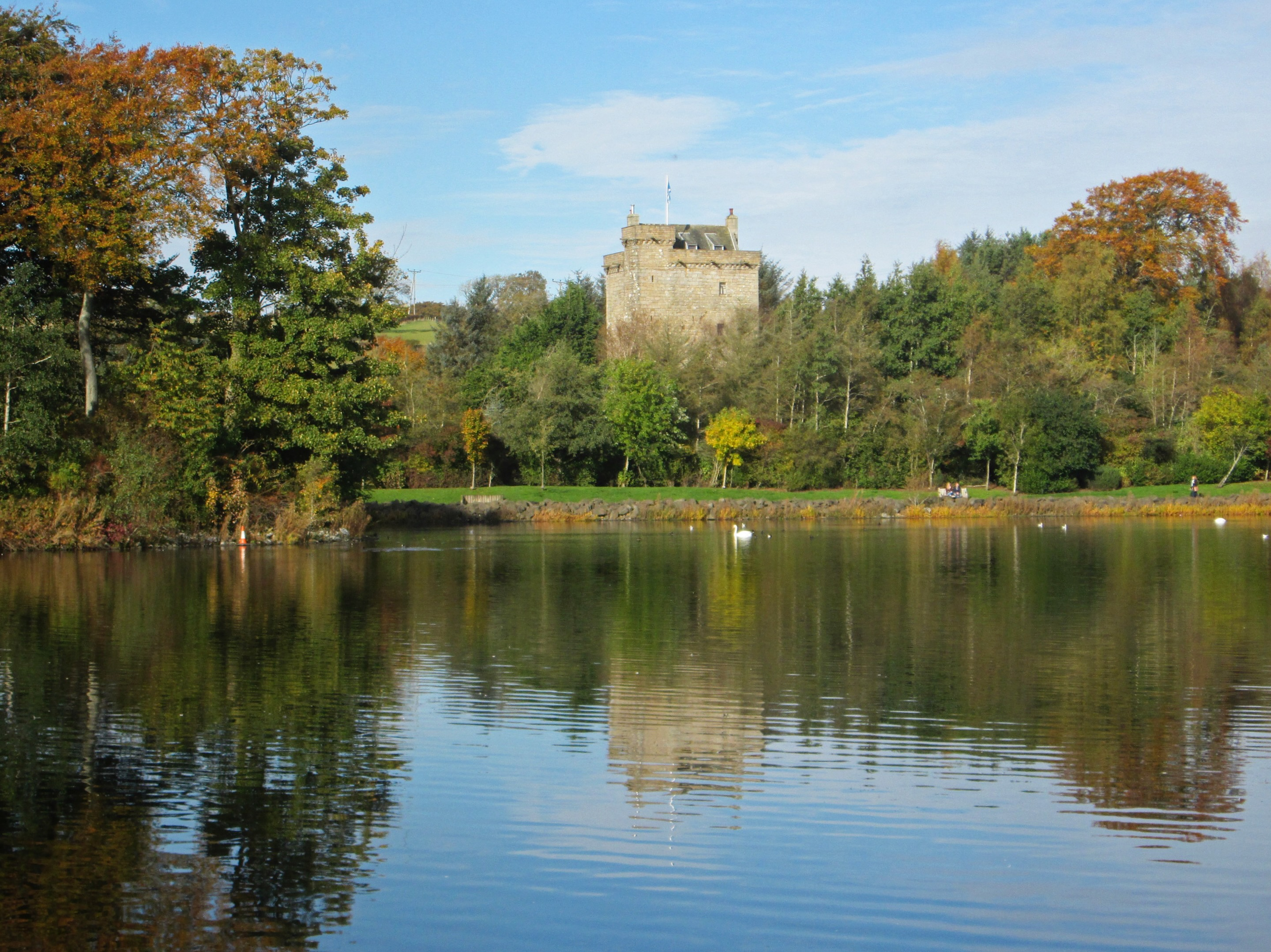
Laigh Mains earthworks on crest of hillside, above woodland behind Mains Castle at Mains Loch, James Hamilton Heritage Park.

The castle appears to have been completely destroyed about this time, and its stonework used to build Mains Castle down the slope from the motte.

After 1783, when David Ure was licensed to preach, he became resident assistant to the minister of East Kilbride parish, and researched its history and mineral strata. In 1793 he published The History of Rutherglen and East-Kilbride, one of the first attempts to deal with the geological features of a small district in a scientific manner. He described the Laigh Mains Motte behind Mains Castle is the "old, and probably the first, edifice of" the Castle of Kilbride.
