= Thomas Maule =

Thomas Maule may refer to:

- Sir Thomas Maule (died 1303), captain of Brechin Castle, Scotland during the First War of Scottish Independence
- Sir Thomas Maule of Panmure (died 1411), Baron of Panmure and Benvie, died at the Battle of Harlaw, 1411
- Thomas Maule of Panmure (died 1450), Baron of Panmure and Benvie and claimant to Brechin
- Thomas Maule (Quaker) (1645–1724), critic of the Salem Witch Trials, who was imprisoned for his public stance
