= Henry de Baliol =

Scottish noble

- Coat of arms as Lord of Cavers; Argent, an orle gules

Chamberlain of Scotland
- In office 1216–????

Personal details
- Died: 1246

Sir Henry de Baliol (died 1246) of Cavers was Chamberlain of Scotland.

== Life ==
Henry was a younger son of Eustace de Balliol and Petronilla FitzPiers. Although invited by King John of England to take his side shortly before the time of Magna Carta, it is probable that he, like his sovereign Alexander II, joined the party of the barons. He is mentioned in the Scottish records in the years between 1223 and 1244, and the appointment of Sir John Maxwell of Caerlaverock, who appears as Lord Chamberlain of Scotland in 1231, must either have been temporary, or Baliol must have retained the title after demitting the office, which George Crawfurd supposes him to have done in 1231. In 1234 he succeeded, in right of his wife as co-heiress, along with her sisters; Christina and brother-in-law Peter de Maule and Isabel, who married David Comyn, to the English fiefs of the Valognes family, vacant by the death of Christian, countess of Essex; it was a rich inheritance, situated in six shires.

In 1241 he attended Henry III of England to the Saintonge War. Dying in 1246, he was buried at Melrose Abbey.

== Marriage and issue ==
Henry married Lora de Valognes, daughter of William de Valognes, lord of Panmure and had the following known issue;

- Guy de Baliol, (died 4 August 1265) who was killed during the Battle of Evesham.
- Alexander de Baliol of Cavers (died 1311), who also served as Chamberlain of Scotland.
- William de Balliol, clerk.
- Ada de Balliol
- Lora de Balliol, married Gilbert de Gaunt, without issue.
