= William Maule =

William Maule may refer to:

- Sir William Maule, successor to the baronies of Panmure and Benvie in 1254
- William Maule of Panmure, successor to the baronies of Panmure and Benvie in 1348
- William Maule, 1st Earl Panmure (1700–1782), Scottish soldier and politician
- William Maule, 1st Baron Panmure (1771–1852), Scottish landowner and politician
- William Henry Maule (1788–1858), English lawyer, MP and judge
- William Maule (rower) (1824–1898), English clergyman and rower
