= Maul =

A maul may refer to any number of large hammers, including:

- War hammer, a medieval weapon
- Post maul, a type of sledgehammer
- Spike maul, railroad hand tool
- Splitting maul, heavy wood-splitting tool resembling both axe and hammer

== People ==
- Al Maul (1865–1958), American baseball player
- Günther Maul (1909–1997), German ichthyologist
- John Maul (1857–1931), English clergyman and cricketer

== Other uses ==
- Animal attack
- Darth Maul, Star Wars character

- Star Wars: Maul – Shadow Lord, animated series featuring the character

- MAUL, a semi-automatic shotgun
- Maul, a rugby term
- Maul, 2003 novel by Tricia Sullivan

== See also ==
- Maull, a surname
- Mauler (disambiguation)
- Maule (disambiguation)
