= Guy de Balliol (died 1265) =

Coat of arms of Lord of Cavers, Argent, an orle gules.

Guy de Balliol (died 4 August 1265) of Cavers in Scotland, Benington and Higham Balliol in England, was an Anglo-Scottish noble. He was the standard bearer of Simon de Montfort, Earl of Leicester at the Battle of Evesham and was killed during the battle.

Guy was the eldest son of Henry de Balliol and Lora de Valognes. He succeeded his father in 1246 and also held estates in England in the right of his mother as co-heiress of William de Valognes of Bennington and Panmure.

He was a follower of Simon de Montfort, Earl of Leicester, in the revolt against Henry III of England, known as the Second Barons' War. He was granted safe passage through England in 1265 as part of an envoy. Guy was the standard bearer of the Earl of Leicester at the battle of Evesham on 4 August 1265 and was killed during the battle. He was succeeded by his younger brother Alexander de Baliol.
