= Roger de Valognes =

12th-century Anglo-Norman nobleman

Roger de Valognes (died c. 1141–42) was an Anglo-Norman nobleman who held lands around Benington in Hertfordshire, a tenure that made Roger the feudal baron of Benington. In 1136 he was a supporter of King Stephen of England's seizure of the English throne from Matilda, the daughter of the previous king, Henry I. Roger built Benington Castle and gave lands to Binham Priory in the early part of Stephen's reign, but was dead by 1142. His barony passed to his first two sons in succession. Another son became a royal official in Scotland.

== Early life ==
Roger was the son of Peter de Valognes. Peter was a tenant-in-chief in Domesday Book with lands in East Anglia and was a Norman from Valognes. Roger had a brother William, and two sisters. A Walter de Valognes was related to Roger, as Roger called Walter a nepos in a charter. This usually means nephew, but it may indicate a grandson or more distant relative.

== During Stephen's reign ==
Roger succeeded to his father's estates near Bennington after 1109, and by holding these lands he is generally considered to be a feudal baron. He appears on documents connected with Stephen's first Easter court held in 1136, where Roger is listed along with the other barons supporting Stephen's succession to the throne. Roger built the stone Benington Castle with a keep at Benington, Hertfordshire in 1136, on a site where his father had erected a motte-and-bailey castle.

Roger issued a confirmation charter to Binham Priory, founded by his father, that is slightly unusual in that it mentions a "decree that where there is no son the daughters divide their father's land by the spindles, nor can the elder take from the younger half of the inheritance by violence or injury". This charter was discussed by William Stubbs, who dated the charter to shortly before 1141. Later historians have attempted to discover which king issued the decree, with general consensus deciding on King Henry I of England. The historian Pauline Stafford has related this decree to Henry's attempts to have his daughter Matilda succeed him on the throne of England, and sees this charter as recording this important step taken by the king towards that goal. A further unusual feature of this charter is that it mentions the negotiations that took place prior to the issuing of the charter, in this case, where Theobald of Bec persuaded Roger to be more generous than he had originally intended with the grant.

== Marriage and children ==
Roger married Agnes, a sister of Pain fitzJohn and daughter of John fitzRichard. They had five sons – Peter, Robert, Philip, Geoffrey, and John.They also had a daughter, Cecily, who married Henry of Essex. Agnes survived Roger and died after 1185. She never remarried.

== Death and legacy ==
Roger died around 1141 or 1142. His heir to his lands was first his eldest son Peter, who died without children in 1158. The lands then passed to Roger's second son Robert. The third son, Philip de Valognes, became the first hereditary chamberlain of Scotland, an office that remained in his family.
