= Folkingham Manor House =

Manor house in Lincolnshire

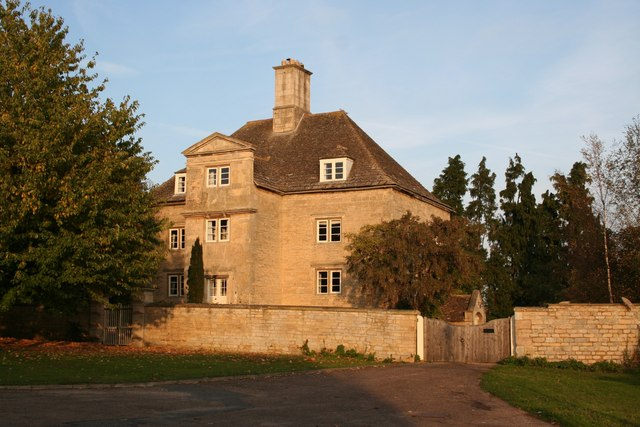
- Folkingham Manor House

- Shown in Lincolnshire
- 52.8887°N 0.4068°W
- Location: Folkingham, Lincolnshire

History
- Built: 1652

Listed Building – Grade II*
- Official name: The Manor House
- Designated: 30 October 1968
- Reference no.: 1360148

Listed Building – Grade II
- Official name: Gateway and Flanking Walls to the Manor House
- Designated: 22 January 1987
- Reference no.: 1317277

Folkingham Manor House is a historic manor house, which was built around 1650, and is located at 8 Market Place, Folkingham.

== History ==
It is probable that the manor house was built by Theophilus Clinton, 4th Earl of Lincoln, for his son Edward Clinton, Lord Clinton, as a wedding present to celebrate his 1652 marriage to Lady Anne Holles, which took place during the Interregnum. It might have been built from stones taken from Folkingham Castle or Sempringham Priory (as it had been abolished in the dissolution of the monasteries a century prior). It was built from Ancaster limestone, with a Collyweston stone slate roof. It was originally known as Clinton House. A map of the town produced circa 1700 shows an orchard to the north of the house, which was gradually built over as the town grew. In the early 18th century walls around the house where built, these are now Grade II listed.

It was owned by the Heathcote family in the Victorian period, who had bought it on the 24th of June 1788. It was updated by Heathcote in the late 18th century, including changes to the gates. When the Folkingham manor estate went up for auction in 1920, the house was sold for £5,600. It was again listed for sale in 2015, this time for £1.05 million.

== Architecture ==
Described as a small country house, with two storeys, and an attic and basement. It is built out of limestone ashlar, course rubble, with some rendered brick. The roof is made out of Collyweston slate. The south porch was added in the late 19th century. All the rooms feature identical chamfered beams, with triangular stops.
