= Geoffrey de Valognes =

12th Century Sheriff of Lancashire

Geoffrey de Valognes Sheriff of Lancashire
- Arms of Geoffrey de Valognes. Or, a cross Gules within a border Azure billette of the first.
- Died: 1190
- Parent(s): Roger de Valognes; Agnes filia John
- Family: de Valognes

Geoffrey de Valognes (died 1190), also known as Geoffrey de Valoines, lord of the manors of Burton, Sutton, Great Saling, Sline, Farleton and Cantsfield was an Anglo-French who served as Sheriff of Lancashire between 1164 and 1166.

== Career ==
Geoffrey was a son of Roger de Valognes and his wife Agnes RitzRichard, a daughter of John FitzRichard. In 1163 Geoffrey married Emma de Bulmer, daughter of Bertram de Bulmer of Brancepeth Castle by his wife Emma Fossard.

== Death and succession ==
Geoffrey died in 1190 without surviving issue. His heir was identified as his niece Gunnora de Valognes, daughter of his brother Robert de Valognes.
