= De Valognes =

Ancient arms of Valognes

Arms of Valognes

de Valognes (Valoignes, Valoines, Valoins, Valons, Valeynes, Valeignes, Valens, Valence, Valance, Valang, Valoniis) is a family name of two distinct powerful families with notable descendants in the centuries immediately following the Norman Conquest. Although a connection between them has been inferred by some authorities, this is not supported by positive evidence.

The family descending from the Domesday ancestor Peter de Valognes is believed to have originated in Valognes (Valoniis in 1056 - 1066; Valuignes, Valoignes ab. 1175), in the Cotentin Peninsula in Normandy. The family descending from Hamo de Valoines of Parham may have originated from Valaines in the region of Rennes in Brittany.

== Family of Peter de Valognes ==
Peter de Valognes obtained lands in Essex, Norfolk, Suffolk, Hertford, Cambridge, and Lincoln and was high sheriff of Essex in 1087.

Philip de Valognes was granted by King William the Lion of Scotland the manors of Panmure and Benvie in Angus and was appointed in around 1180 the Chamberlain of Scotland. Philip died in 1215 and his only son William became the Chamberlain of Scotland until his death in 1219. William had no male issue and his titles and lands were split between his three heiresses.

The following is a list of castles known to have been in the ownership of the family:

England

- Benington Castle, Hertfordshire

Scotland

- Panmure Castle, Angus
- Benvie manse, Angus
- Kilbride Castle, South Lanarkshire
- Inchgall Castle

The heirs of Hamo the Steward, Sheriff of Kent, had extensive lands in Essex, Kent and Surrey at the Domesday Survey. This family is traced through the descent of one of the manors of Titsey in Surrey, which passed from Hamo to his niece Matilda. Geoffrey de Valognes, lord of Titsey, was father of Hamon de Valognes, who was prominent as the Justiciar of Ireland in 1196-1199 when it lay under the rule of John, brother to Richard I of England. Hamon was a tenant of the Honour of Gloucester, and became Sheriff of Cardiff in 1185. John entrusted Waterford to him in 1193. (At that time Theobald Walter was Pincerna (Butler) of Ireland, whose mother Matilda de Valoines was daughter of Theobald de Valoines the elder, Lord of Parham.) At John's accession in 1199 Hamon received lands in Limerick, and in 1200 became Sheriff of Cambridgeshire and Huntingdonshire and bailiff of Glamorgan. His son and heir was Hamon de Valognes the younger.

== Family of Hamo de Valoines of Parham ==
At the Survey, Hamo de Valenis held lands in Parham in Suffolk from Count Alan of Brittany, and the descent of the family is traced through their service to the Honour of Richmond. Hamo appears to have had at least two sons, Theobald and Robert (fil. Hamo). Theobald de Valoines succeeded as Lord of Parham, which owed castle-guard service to Richmond Castle, and he flourished c. 1130-1135. He married Helewise, and had two daughters, Bertha and Matilda, and a son or heir Robert de Valoines. Theobald's daughter Bertha married Ranulf de Glanvill, Chief Justiciar (founder of Butley Priory (1171) and Leiston Abbey (1183) in Suffolk), and his daughter Matilda was the wife of Hervey Walter, and mother of Hubert Walter, Archbishop of Canterbury, Theobald Walter and Osbert fitzHervey.

Robert de Valoines was the heir, and is supposed the son, of Theobald the elder: he was the father of Theobald the younger, who owed his service to Richmond in 1178, and was the founder of Hickling Priory (1185) in Norfolk and Campsey Priory (before 1195) in Suffolk. Theobald's sisters Joan and Agnes de Valoines were prioresses at Campsey, c. 1195-1235, and were assisted by one Hamo de Valoines. Theobald the younger married Avice, and his heir was Thomas de Valoines. Thomas was succeeded by Robert de Valognes, whose mother was Isabel de Creke, sister of Bartholomew de Creke. Robert married Roesia, sister of William de Blund (of the patron family of Ixworth Priory, who died at the Battle of Lewes, 1264). Their son Robert the younger, born c. 1247, married Eva, widow of Nicholas Tregoz of Tolleshunt D'Arcy in Essex, and died in 1281 leaving two infant daughters, Rohesia and Cecilia. Cecilia became the mother of Robert de Ufford, 1st Earl of Suffolk and his brethren.

The custody of the royal castle of Orford in Suffolk was in this family.
