= Robert de Valognes =

12th-century Anglo-Norman nobleman

Robert de Valognes (died 1184), Lord of Benington, was an English noble.

== Life ==
Robert was the second-eldest son of Roger de Valognes of Benington and Agnes, a daughter of John fitzRichard. After the death without issue of his elder brother Peter, he inherited Benington in Hertfordshire. He confirmed the charters of his father and brother to Binham Priory. In 1177, King Henry II of England ordered that the stone castle at Benington, constructed by his father Roger during the Anarchy, be demolished (slighted). Robert died in 1184.

== Marriage and issue ==
Robert married Hawise, whose parentage is unclear and had one daughter Gunnora de Valognes, who married, firstly, Durand de Osteilli and, secondly, Robert Fitzwalter, and had issue.
