= Maull =

Maull is a surname. Notable people named Maull include:

- Henry Maull (1829–1914), British photographer
- January Maull (1800s), state legislator in Alabama during the Reconstruction era
- Joseph Maull (1781–1846), American physician and Governor of Delaware
- Otto Maull (1887–1957), German geographer and geopolitician

== See also ==
- Maul (disambiguation)
