= Maule (surname) =

Maule is a surname. Notable people with the surname include:

- Brad Maule (born 1951), American actor
- Fox Maule-Ramsay, 11th Earl of Dalhousie (1801–1874)
- Gareth Maule (born 1987), Welsh rugby player
- Sir John Maule (fl. 1880s), first Director of Public Prosecutions for England and Wales
- John Maule (MP) (1706–1781), Scottish politician
- June Maule (1917–2009), owner of Maule Air
- Lauderdale Maule (1807–1854), Scottish soldier
- Sir Peter Maule of Fowlis (died 1254), baron of Panmure and Benvie
- Tex Maule (1915–1981), American football writer
- Sir Thomas Maule (died 1303), Scottish knight
- Thomas Maule (Quaker), American quaker
- Ward Maule (1833–1913), English clergyman and cricketer
- William Maule, 1st Earl Panmure (1700–1782)
- William Henry Maule (1788–1858), English lawyer, politician and judge
