= Philip de Valognes =

Scottish noble

Philip de Valognes Lord Chamberlain of Scotland Lord of Panmure Lord of Benvie Lord of Ringwood
- Died: 5 November 1215
- Resting place: Melrose Abbey
- Children: William de Valognes, Sibilla de Valognes
- Parent(s): Roger de Valognes; Agnes filia John
- Family: de Valognes (de Valoniis)

Philip de Valognes, Lord of Ringwood, Benvie and Panmure was an Anglo-Norman Scottish noble. He was the Lord Chamberlain of Scotland between 1165–1171 and 1193–1214.

Philip was the fifth son of Roger de Valognes and Agnes filia John. Around 1165, near the end of the reign of Malcolm IV of Scotland, Philip with his younger brother Roger went together to Scotland; The Scots Peerage shows their family name as Valoniis.

Philip was appointed as Chamberlain of Scotland to William the Lion, serving from 1165 to c.1171, and was granted the lands of Panmure in Angus, and Benvie in the Carse of Gowrie. In 1174 he was one of the hostages for William's release named in the Treaty of Falaise. In 1175 Philip was captured by William Marshal during a tournament at Le Mans, Duchy of Maine, France, and was ransomed. Around 1186 his brother Roger was made Lord of Kilbride.

Philip resumed his role as Chamberlain from c.1193 to 1214, then continued in that role on Alexander II's accession in 1214. On Philip's death the following year, he was succeeded by his son William.

Philip granted lands in Ringwood, Roxburghshire, to Melrose Abbey and an acre of land in Stinchandhaven to Coupar Angus Abbey. He died 5 November 1215 and was interred at Melrose Abbey.

== Issue ==
- William, married Lora de Quincy; had issue.
- Sibilla, who married Robert de Stuteville; had issue.

== Citations ==
Preceded by Walter de Barclay	Chamberlain of Scotland; 1205–1214	Succeeded by William de Valognes
