= Walter Maule =

Walter Maule Baron of Panmure and Benvie
- Died: 1348
- Children: William Maule; Henry Maule
- Parent(s): Henry Maule; Margaret Hay of Locherworth

Walter Maule (died 1348) was the son and heir of Sir Henry Maule, Baron of Panmure and Benvie, and Margaret, daughter of Sir William Hay of Locherworth. He was warden of Kildrummy Castle in the reign of David II.

The name of Walter's spouse is unknown, but he left two sons, William and Henry. William was named successor to the baronies of Panmure and Benvie on his father's death in 1348.
