= William Comyn, Lord of Kilbride =

Lord of Kilbride (1236–1286)

William Comyn Lord of Kilbride
- Died: 1283
- Spouse: Euphemia de Clavering
- Children: John Comyn Edmund Comyn
- Parent: David Comyn, Lord of Kilbride Isobel de Valognes

William Comyn, Lord of Kilbride was a son of David Comyn and Isobel de Valognes. Sheriff of Ayr in 1263, he died in 1283.

== Life ==
William was a son of David Comyn, Lord of Kilbride and Isabel de Valognes. William was the Sheriff of Ayr in 1263 - 1265. He succeeded upon his father's death, as Lord of Kilbride in 1247.

== Marriage and issue ==
William married Euphemia, the daughter of Roger FitzJohn, Lord of Warkworth and Clavering and Isabel de Dunbar, they had the following known issue:

- John (d.c. 1290), without issue.
- Edmund, married Maria, had issue.
