= Lord of Kilbride =

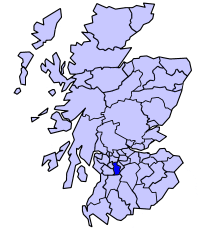
Extent of Lordship of Kilbride

The Lord of Kilbride was a title in the peerage of Scotland.

== List of lords of Kilbride ==
- Roger de Valognes (around 1165-c. 1215)
- David Comyn (c. 1215–1247)
- William Comyn (1247–1283)
- John Comyn (1283–1290)
- Edmund Comyn (1290–1306)
- forfeited to the Crown
