= Benington High Wood =

Protected area in Hertfordshire, England

Coordinates: 51.8952°N 0.1339°W

- Site of Special Scientific Interest
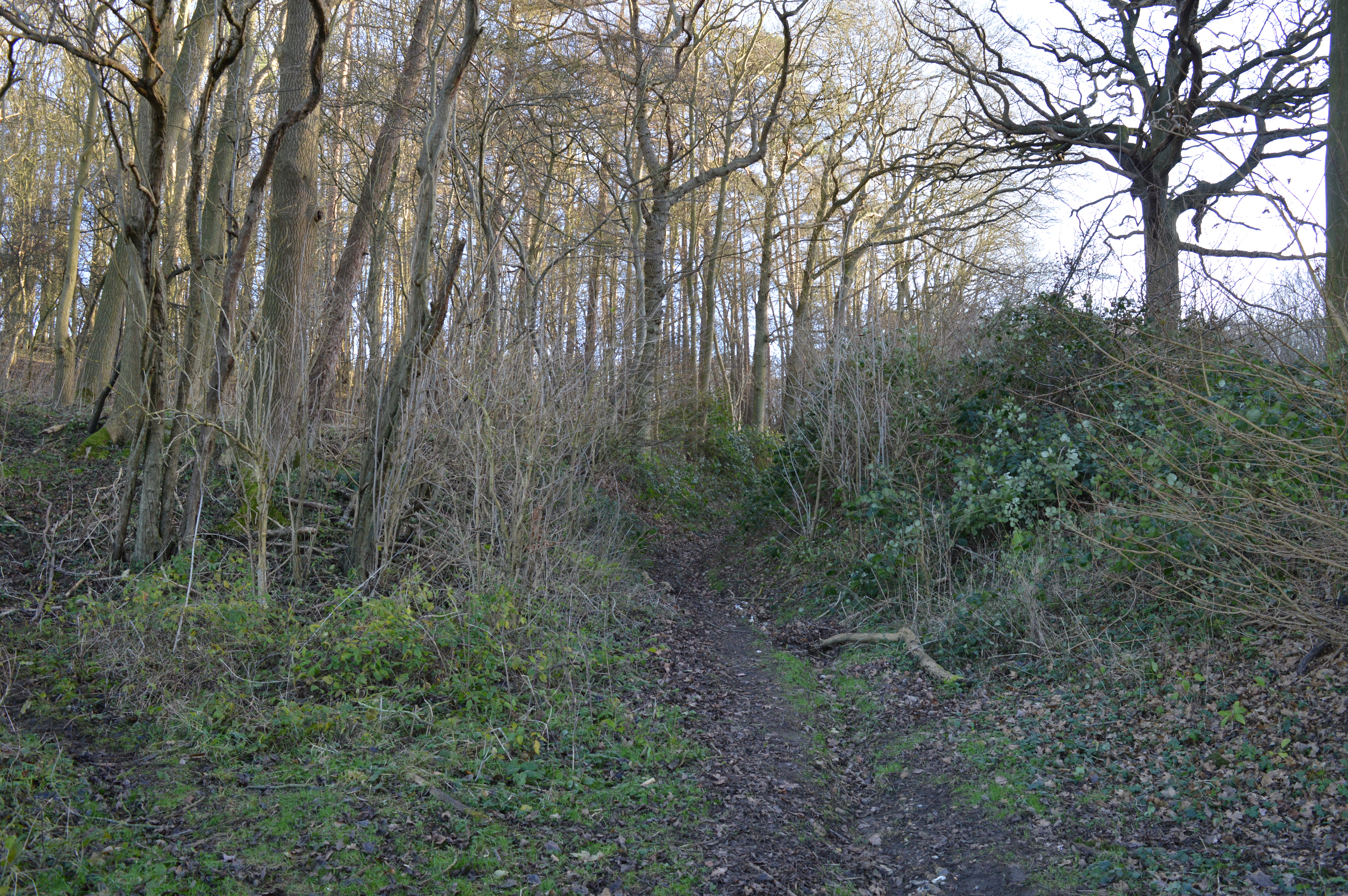
- Location of Benington High Wood.
- Area of search: Hertfordshire
- Grid reference: TL285235
- Interest: Biological
- Area: 20.7 ha (51 acres)
- Notification date: 1984
- Location map: Magic Map

Benington High Wood is a 20.7-hectare (51-acre) biological Site of Special Scientific Interest in Benington, Hertfordshire. The planning authority is East Hertfordshire District Council.

The site is ancient woodland, described by Natural England as "one of the best remaining examples in the county of the pedunculate oak-hornbeam of the ash-maple variety". Shrub species include field maple and hazel, with a higher ground flora diversity in clearings and rides.

There is access from a footpath between Walkern Road and Lordship Farm.

== See also ==
- List of Sites of Special Scientific Interest in Hertfordshire
