= Mauler =

Mauler or Maulers may refer to:

== Military ==
- Martin AM Mauler, a US Navy attack aircraft introduced in 1948
- MIM-46 Mauler, a US Army self-propelled anti-aircraft missile system that suffered development problems and was canceled in 1965
- VS-32, a former US Navy anti-submarine squadron nicknamed the "Maulers"

== Sports ==
- Pittsburgh Maulers, a United States Football League team that competed in the 1984 season before folding
- Missoula Maulers, a junior ice hockey team in the Western States Hockey League, from Missoula, Montana
- Maulers (slamball), a slamball team formerly known as the Steal
- Montgomery Maulers, original name of the Montgomery Bears, a defunct American Indoor Football Association team from Montgomery, Alabama
- The Mauler, nickname of Alexander Gustafsson (born 1987), Swedish mixed martial artist

== Other uses ==
- Maulers, Oise, a commune in France
- Mauler (comics), two Marvel Comics characters

== See also ==
- The Manassa Mauler, nickname of Jack Dempsey (1895–1983), American heavyweight boxing champion
- The Missouri Mauler (1931–1996), ring name of wrestler Larry "Rocky" Hamilton
- Maul (disambiguation)
