= Maule =

Maule may refer to:

== Places ==
- Maule Region, one of the 15 Regions that make up the Chilean territory
- Maule River, river in Central Chile, which gives name to the Maule Region
- Maule, Chile, commune and town of Talca province in the Maule Region of Chile
- Maule Valley, a sub-region of the Viticultural Region of Chile's Central Valley
- Maule, Yvelines is a commune in the Yvelines department of France
- Condado de Maule is Spanish Count

== Other uses ==
- Maule (surname)
- Maule Air, manufacturer of light single-engine aircraft in Moultrie, Georgia
- Maule's quince, a genus of three species of deciduous spiny shrubs
- Maule Tuco-tuco rodent
- Maule, a sept of the Scottish Clan Ramsay
