= Benvie =

Coordinates: 56°28′14″N 3°05′32″W

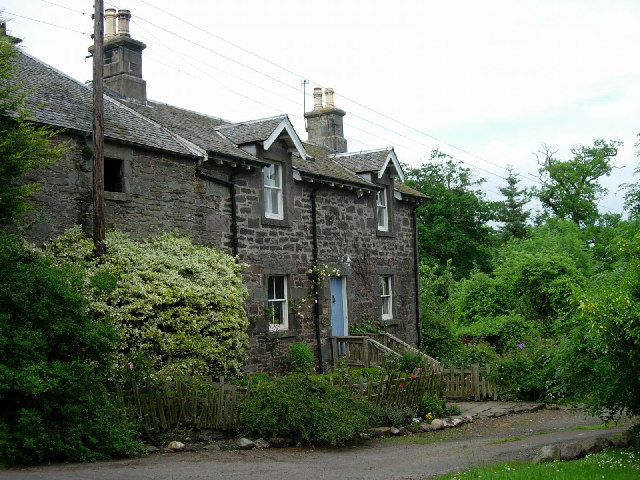
Cottages in Benvie

Benvie, is a hamlet and former parish and feudal barony in Angus, Scotland.

The hamlet is situated on the Invergowrie Burn, northwest of Dundee, surrounded by agricultural land.

The parish was joined with the parish of Liff in 1758. The former parish church is in ruins and a Pictish cross-slab of the 9th Century stood in the churchyard.

The feudal barony of Benvie was held by the Valognes family from the 12th century, until passing by the heiress Christina to the Maule family, in the 13th century.
