= Mains Castle, South Lanarkshire =

Castle in East Kilbride, South Lanarkshire, Scotland

Mains Castle
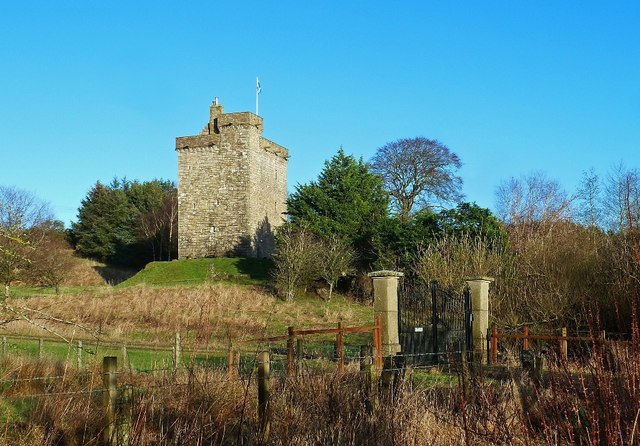
- Mains Castle in 2015

Location
- Coordinates: 55°46′41″N 4°11′21″W

Site history
- Built: 15th century

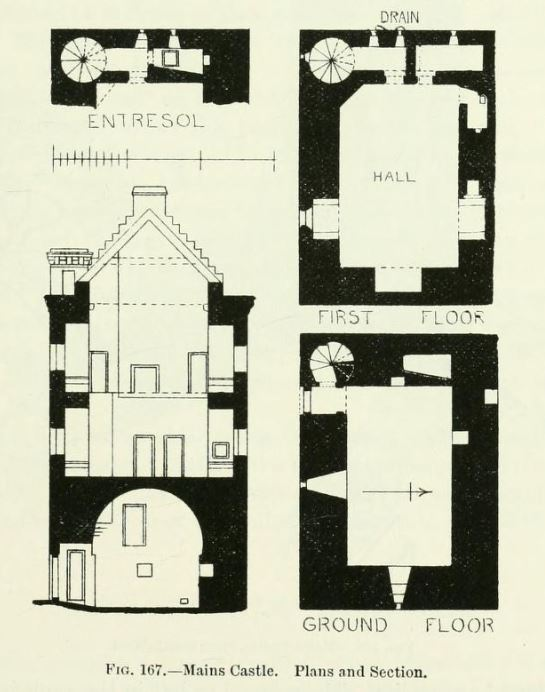
Plan of the tower house

Mains Castle is a rectangular tower house dating from the fifteenth century, situated near East Kilbride, South Lanarkshire, Scotland. It is a Category A listed building. The castle was constructed by the Lindsay family to replace the Comyn Castle, which may or may not occupy the site of the earlier Kilbride Castle.
