= Gilbert de Gaunt, 1st Baron Gaunt =

12th century English noble

Gilbert de Gaunt
- Died: 1297

Gilbert de Gaunt, 1st Baron Gaunt (died 1297), Lord of Folkingham was an English noble.

He was the heir of his father Gilbert de Gaunt. Gilbert was summoned to parliament from 1295 until 1297. He married Lora, daughter of Henry de Balliol and Lora de Valognes. Gilbert died in 1297, without issue, his estates passed to his sisters, Margaret, Nichole and Juliane. Margaret was married to William de Kerdeston, Nichole to Peter de Mauley, while Juliane died unmarried. His sister Hawise, predeceased him, without issue.
