= Henry Maule =

Sir Henry Maule Baron of Panmure and Benvie
- Spouse: Margaret Hay of Locherwood
- Children: Walter Maule; William Maule; Peter Maule; Christian Maule
- Parent(s): Sir William Maule; Ethana de Vallibus

Sir Henry Maule was the son and heir of Sir William Maule, Baron of Panmure and Benvie and Ethana de Vallibus, daughter of John Vaux, Lord of Dirleton. Henry succeeded as Baron on his father's death and was married to Margaret Hay, daughter of Sir William Hay of Locherworth.

He was knighted by Robert I of Scotland for his services during the First War of Independence. He left three sons: Walter, who succeeded him as Baron of Panmure and Benvie; William; Peter; and a daughter, Christian.
