= Folkingham =

Village and civil parish in Lincolnshire, England

Coordinates: 52.88725°N 0.40596°W

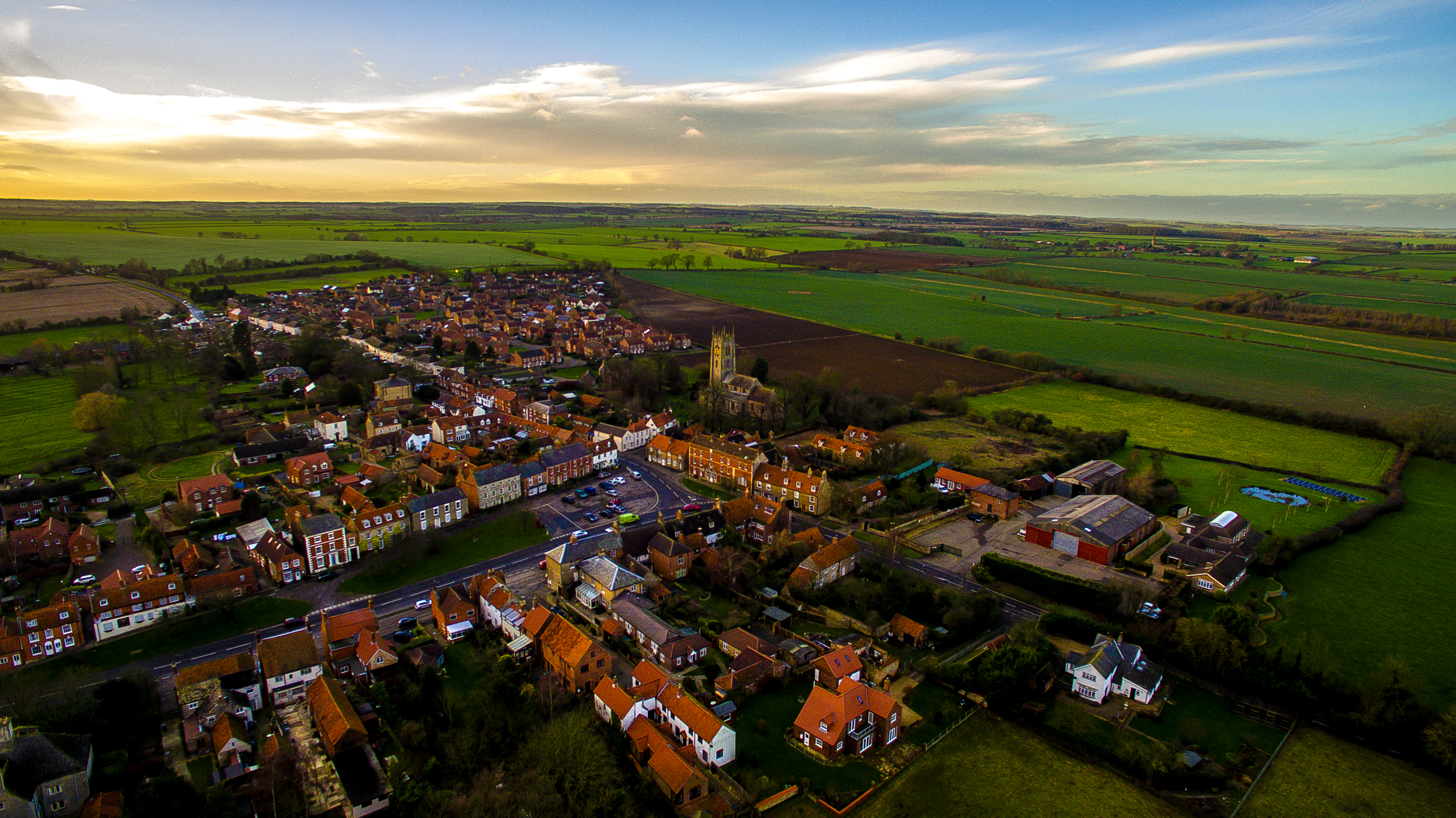
- Folkingham

- Location within Lincolnshire
- Population: 796 (2011)
- OS grid reference: TF072332
  - London: 95 mi (153 km) S
- District: South Kesteven
- Shire county: Lincolnshire
- Region: East Midlands
- Country: England
- Sovereign state: United Kingdom
- Post town: SLEAFORD
- Postcode district: NG34
- Dialling code: 01529
- Police: Lincolnshire
- Fire: Lincolnshire
- Ambulance: East Midlands
- UK Parliament: Grantham and Stamford

Folkingham (/ˈfɒkɪŋəm/ FOK-ing-əm) is a village and civil parish in the South Kesteven district of Lincolnshire, England. It lies on the A15 road 11 miles (18 km) north of Bourne and 10 miles (16 km) south of Sleaford. The 2001 Census gave a population of 729, rising to 796 at the 2011 census, and estimated at 795 in 2016.

== Topography and development ==
This former town is attractively situated in a wide rolling landscape, just up from the fen edge, on the northern incline of an east–west stream valley. The settlement is centred on a large Market Place, positioned between a church on high land to the NW and a former baronial castle on low land to the SE. The modern A15 runs through the market area, rather than bypassing the settlement as at Aslackby and Osbournby, taking a dramatic right-angled turn at its NW corner.

The earliest settlement was probably on the high promontory overlooking stream valleys close to the church. It is likely this was linked to Roman roads (King Street and Mareham Lane) on either side via an east–west route running along what is now West Street and Sleaford Road. The castle site on low-lying land to the SE probably evolved from a pre-Conquest fortified enclosure which was the administrative centre of the soke of Folkingham. A market area developed in between the church and castle and this became the site for weekly markets and seven annual fairs.

The Market Place, West Street and Sleaford Road were lined with houses, farms, shops and inns/public houses and this whole area was remodelled in the late 18th century by the Heathcote Family of Normanton (Rutland) who bought the manor in 1788. The most dramatic manifestation of this work was the refaçading of The Greyhound Inn at the top of the Market Place. In recognition of its importance, this area became one of the first designated conservation areas in Lincolnshire in 1968.

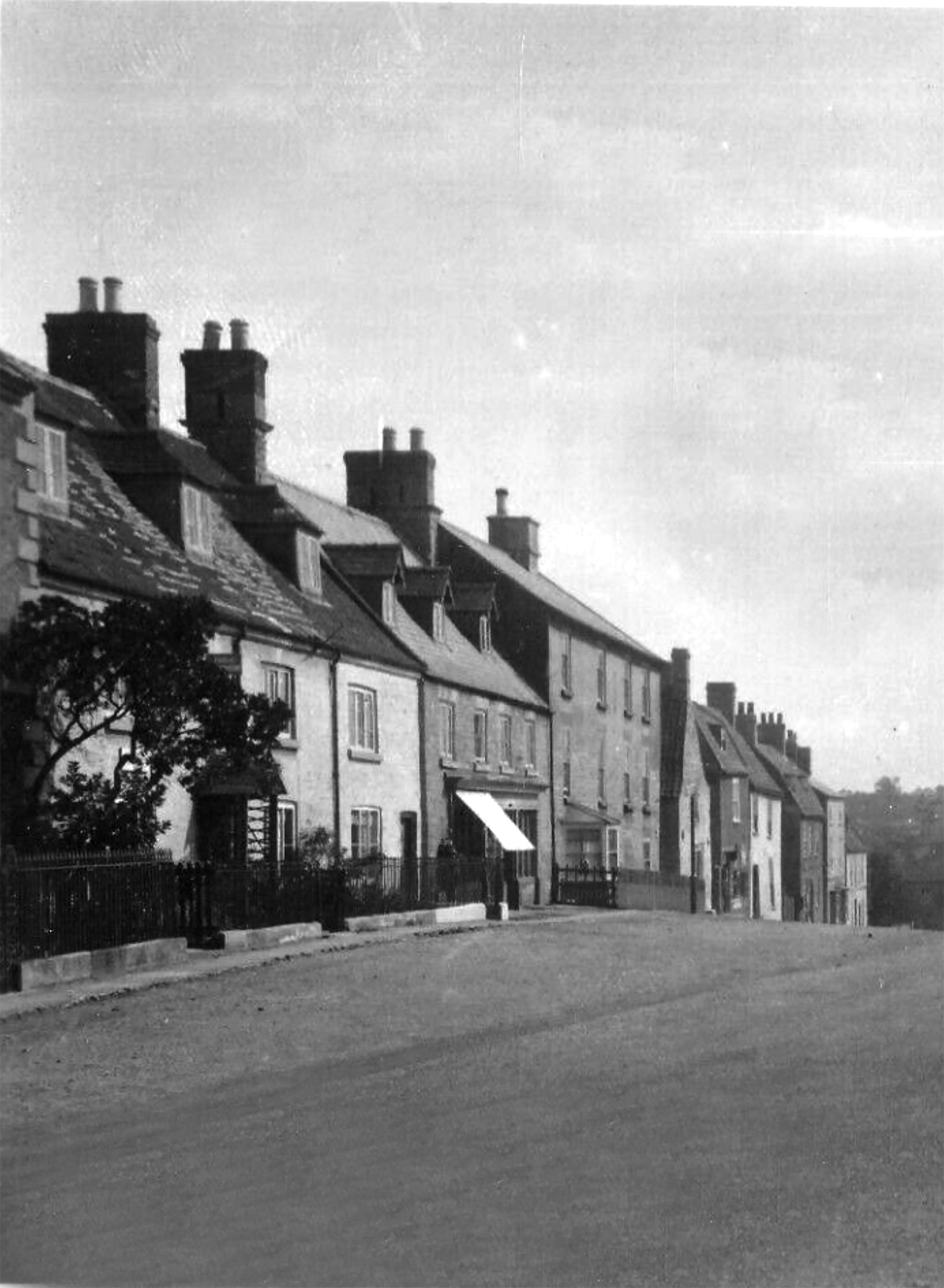
Folkingham Market Place looking SE.

The town was bypassed by the railway and declined in the Victorian period as the coaching trade collapsed and services and retailing moved to larger towns. The main development since has been the erection of council housing off West Street in the 1950s, followed by the private Churchfields estate behind, built between 1987 and 1997.

The modern village retains a pub, The New Inn on West Street, and a local shop in the Market Place.

== Toponymy ==
Folkingham is an early Saxon place name and appears in the Domesday survey of 1086 as Folchingeham. Its meaning can be interpreted as the 'Homestead belonging to Folc(a) or the estate of the Folcingas'.

Folc, however, as in 'people or nation' was also used in the Anglo-Saxon period as a district name (e.g. Norfolk) and may have been related to the Scandinavian fylki, meaning district. Could folc, therefore, also refer to a territorial district which became the soke of Folkingham? Folkestone probably derives its name from 'Folca's Stone', which was a meeting place of a territorial area.

In the mid-18th century an alternative spelling of 'Falkingham' was introduced, perhaps in an effort to make the place name sound more genteel – its correct pronunciation is 'Fokingham'. This variant became predominant in the 19th century, but fell out of favour in the early 20th century.

== Early history ==
It is likely that Folkingham originated as an Anglo-Saxon settlement in the sixth century, developing into a regionally important royal soke centre, or multiple estate by the eighth century. Its location was obviously attractive to these settlers, being on a promontory above stream valleys between the Kesteven forest and sea access via the fens to the Wash. It was also close to two Roman roads (Mareham Lane and King Street) which led to Lincoln, which still had regional significance. It is probable that Folkingham was the southern centre of the territory of the Billingas people, whose name is reflected in local place names, such as Billingborough.

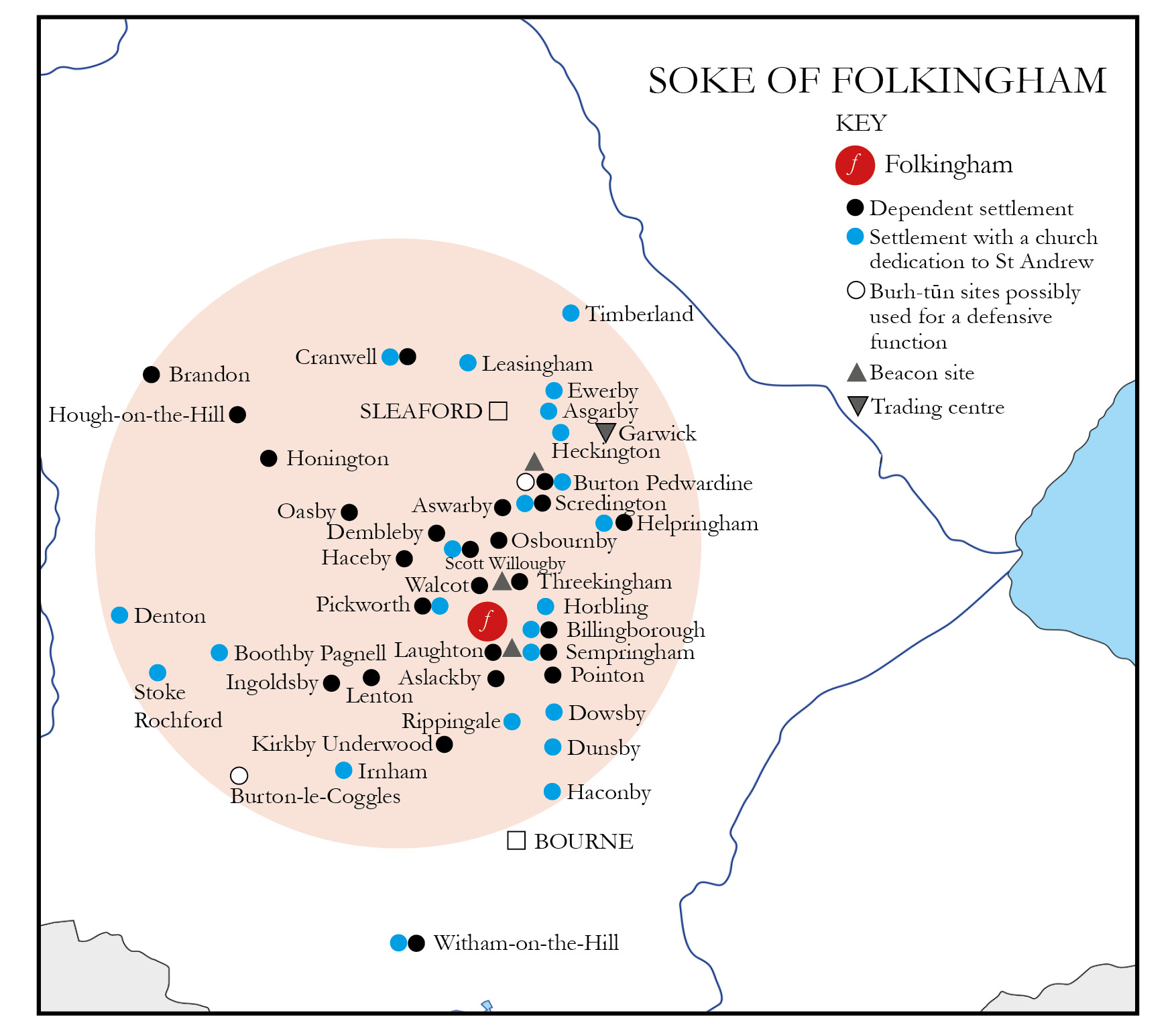
Dependent territories within the Soke of Folkingham, later Wapentake of Aveland.

In 679 the region was conquered by Mercia, bringing it into the sphere of Mercian royal interest. A royal nunnery at Stow Green, off Mareham Lane founded by Æthelthryth, was entrusted to St Werberg by King Æthelred of Mercia. It is likely that King Æthelred developed nearby Folkingham into a soke centre, or multiple estate, in this period with a minster church dedicated to the popular St Andrew. The Soke of Folkingham, which grew into an estate of over 23 dependent villages, was roughly analogous with that of the later Wapentake of Aveland, which must have evolved from it. The probable minster status of the church is reflected in the numerous dedications to St Andrew within the soke.

It is likely that early settlement was on the highest ground of the promontory around the minster church (current site of St Andrew's Church). This settlement lay north of an east–west route linking it to the Roman roads on each side, which is still discernible in the modern road configuration of West Street and Sleaford Road.

== Danelaw ==
The low-lying region of Lincolnshire, with its long eastern coast punctuated by river valleys, was particularly susceptible to incursion from Norse invaders. It was thus a prime target in the Danish-led Viking raids which started sporadically at the end of the eighth century, developing gradually into a more-focused settlement initiative during the following century.

The extent of Danish settlement in the Folkingham region is revealed by the survival of some twenty-seven place names ending in by. These are mainly sited on the upland areas surrounding the old soke core and it is possible that some may have had a military function, as has been suggested with similar concentrations on the coast of Norfolk. It is perhaps in this period that a burgh, or fortified settlement, was established at Billingborough, as implied by the place name - perhaps its function was to protect the soke hub from incursion from the east?

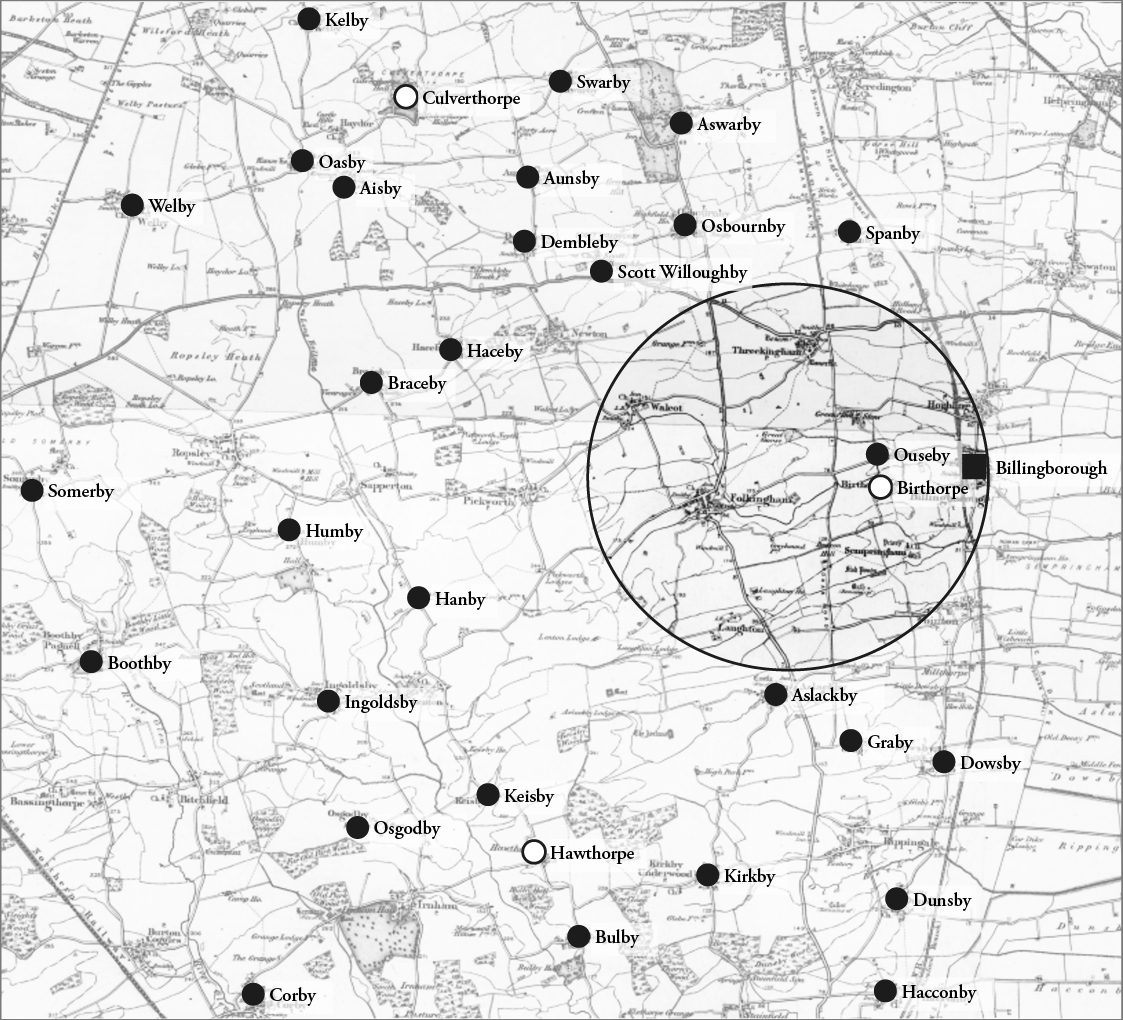
Danish settlement in the Folkingham area as evinced from place names, eg. names ending in ‘by’

In the tenth century, Folkingham became part of the wapentake of Aveland, an area consisting of fen edge and uplands, stretching from Bourne to Osbournby. Wapentakes were the approximate equivalent in Danelaw of the Anglo-Saxon hundred, and the word, of Scandinavian origin, probably derived from a meeting place, where a presence or vote was taken by the brandishing, or ownership, of weapons. Aveland was probably established as an administrative unit some time after Edward the Elder restored English rule to Kesteven in 918. Its boundaries were defined by the earlier soke of Folkingham. The meeting place of the wapentake was clearly marked on the 1885 Ordnance Survey map, which shows it was connected to Folkingham via Greenfields Lane - a modern farm track now leads down to the site. Until recent ploughing, there were still visible the remains of a moat bordering a rectilinear asymmetric enclosure, defined by a large ditch and banks, measuring one hundred and five metres by forty metres.

The final phase of pre-conquest development at Folkingham was probably the evolution of an enclosed and perhaps later fortified residence on a new alignment at the south east corner of the earlier grid-planned settlement. The fact that Ulf of Fenisc, a major landholder at the time of Domesday, chose Folkingham as his caput, or principal residence implies there was suitable accommodation there for him and his retinue when he was in residence. The siting of a defensive enclosure on an undeveloped peripheral site, at the junction of three stream valleys where marshy ground and water meadows to south and east would have made attack more difficult, would have made sense. Water could be employed to fill defensive ditches and provide a supply for domestic needs. The site also had the advantage of commanding a prospect of the east-west axial road as it crossed the valley - indeed its orientation is towards this rather than the projected grid of the earlier settlement.

== Post-Conquest ==
The Domesday survey of 1086 records a total population of thirty-eight households consisting of twenty-four villagers, nine smallholders and five soke or free men. Sleaford had fifty households and Bourne fifty-four. Billingborough as a comparison had nineteen households. However, many dependent soke settlements were bigger, such as Walcot with fifty-one families, which is now just a hamlet. Total tax assessed was twelve geld units - this was the same tax as Sleaford and Spalding, but much more than Bourne which was assessed at five and a half. There was one mill, valued at ten shillings and eight pence, and one church. The lord in 1066 was Ulf Fenisc, while the lord in 1086 was Gilbert de Gant.

The pattern of ownership by a leading baron continued through the post-conquest and later medieval period. Although these tenants-in-chief had their seat at Folkingham, their sphere of interests was wide-ranging - it is clear they were not particularly interested in developing Folkingham as a town. So Folkingham gradually transformed from a soke centre into an aristocratic seat.

Gilbert de Gant's possession of the soke of Folkingham heralded a dynasty which lasted for over two hundred years, finally ending in 1298. Although Folkingham was probably their primary residence in England, this does not mean that the family were here on any regular basis. They were an international aristocratic family with interests across the country and on the continent. As leading aristocrats, the de Gants were involved in national affairs of state. Gilbert's eldest son, Walter (born 1087) sided with Stephen of Blois' claim, as the grandson of William the Conqueror, to the throne during the so-called Anarchy of 1135-55, fighting against the rival position of the Empress Matilda. Walter was at Stephen's Easter court in 1136 and fought at the Battle of the Standard, near Northallerton (Yorkshire), in 1138. Gilbert III was an important player in the events at the end of King John's reign, surrounding Louis' invasion attempt, which began with him arriving on English soil in May 1216, and ended at the Battle of Lincoln in May 1217.

Folkingham Castle in the post-conquest period can be classed as a higher-status baronial castle - that is one owned by one of the king's tenants-in-chief, rather than a honourial castle, which is one erected by a tenant of the baron. There were fourteen such baronial castles in Lincolnshire, with the nearest being at Bourne, Castle Bytham and Stainby - Sleaford Castle was uniquely an ecclesiastical property of the Bishops of Lincoln. Of these, nine were founded in manors which had soke status, suggesting that baronial castles were an evolution of existing aristocratic control. It is likely that Folkingham's Norman post-conquest castle was developed from the fortified residence of his predecessor, Ulf of Fenisc.

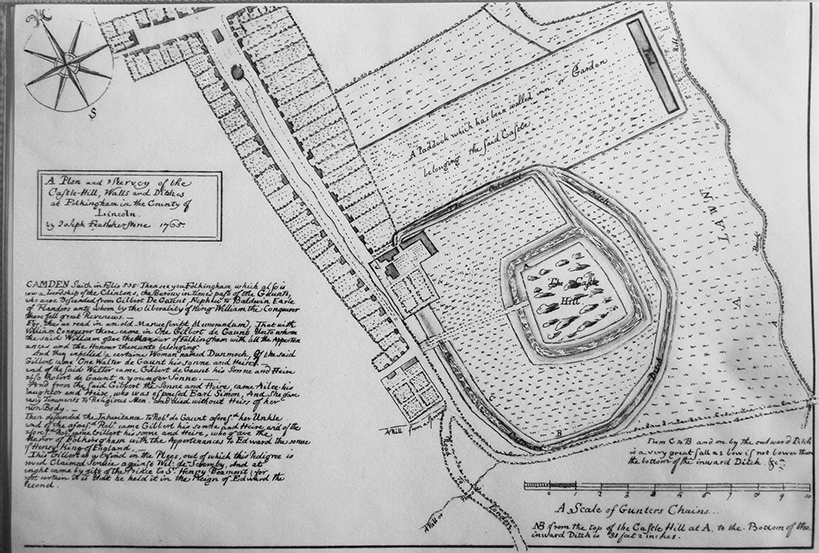
Joseph Featherstone's Plan and Survey of the Castle Hill, Walls and Ditches of Folkingham in the County of Lincoln, 1765.

Joseph Featherstone's plan of 1765 affords a good impression of the form of the medieval castle. It clearly shows the fortified oval ringwork surrounding a roughly square platform, some two hundred and forty six feet on each side, on which the main castle buildings would have stood. The Normans would have strengthened its defences, adding a wooden pallisade and developing the surrounding ditch/moat and bank works to the east, while erecting new buildings within. The bailey area, which contained the lesser service buildings, filled the outer area of the ringwork, with a focus on the western entrance which faced into the safety of the settlement. It was probably rebuilt in stone in the 12th century and an account of 1219 refers to a 'high tower' which may have been a stone donjon from the Anarchy period.

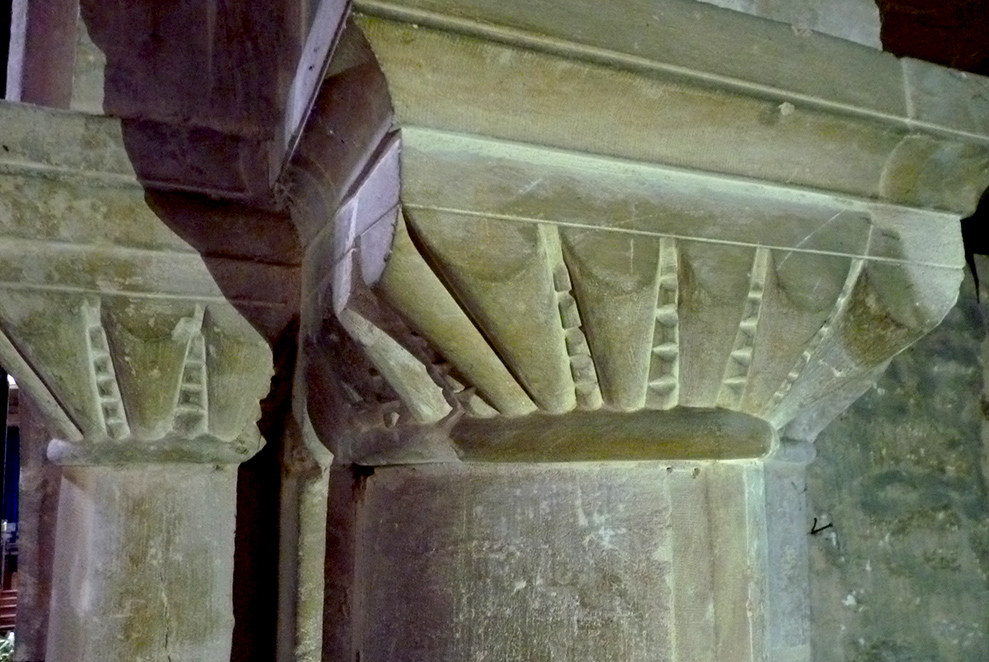
Twelfth-century beaded scalloped capitals, St Andrew's Church, Folkingham.

Between the castle and church, which we also know was rebuilt after the conquest, a market place developed, which was later licensed for regular markets and fairs. From this market function trades, retailers and alehouses must have evolved, but of these we now have little evidence. Folkingham's sphere of interest extended outside the town to the large annual market which developed around the feast day of St Ætheldreda at Stow Green, and the mother house of the Gilbertine order at Sempringham, both of which was closely linked to the tenants-in-chief of the manor. But while Folkingham developed some of the attributes associated with a town, its single autocratic ownership stifled entrepreneurialism. There was no independent structure of burgesses, such as evolved at Stamford, where leading businessmen established control of the town's affairs.

The development of Sempringham Priory into a major monastic house has eclipsed its origins, which were closely tied to Folkingham. It was common for Norman barons in the eleventh and twelfth centuries to support, or initiate, the foundation of priories in the vicinity of their castles, to act as houses of intercessionary prayers and as mausoleums. Sempringham fits this pattern perfectly, with the de Gant family providing the lands and funding to formally establish the house in the mid-twelfth century.

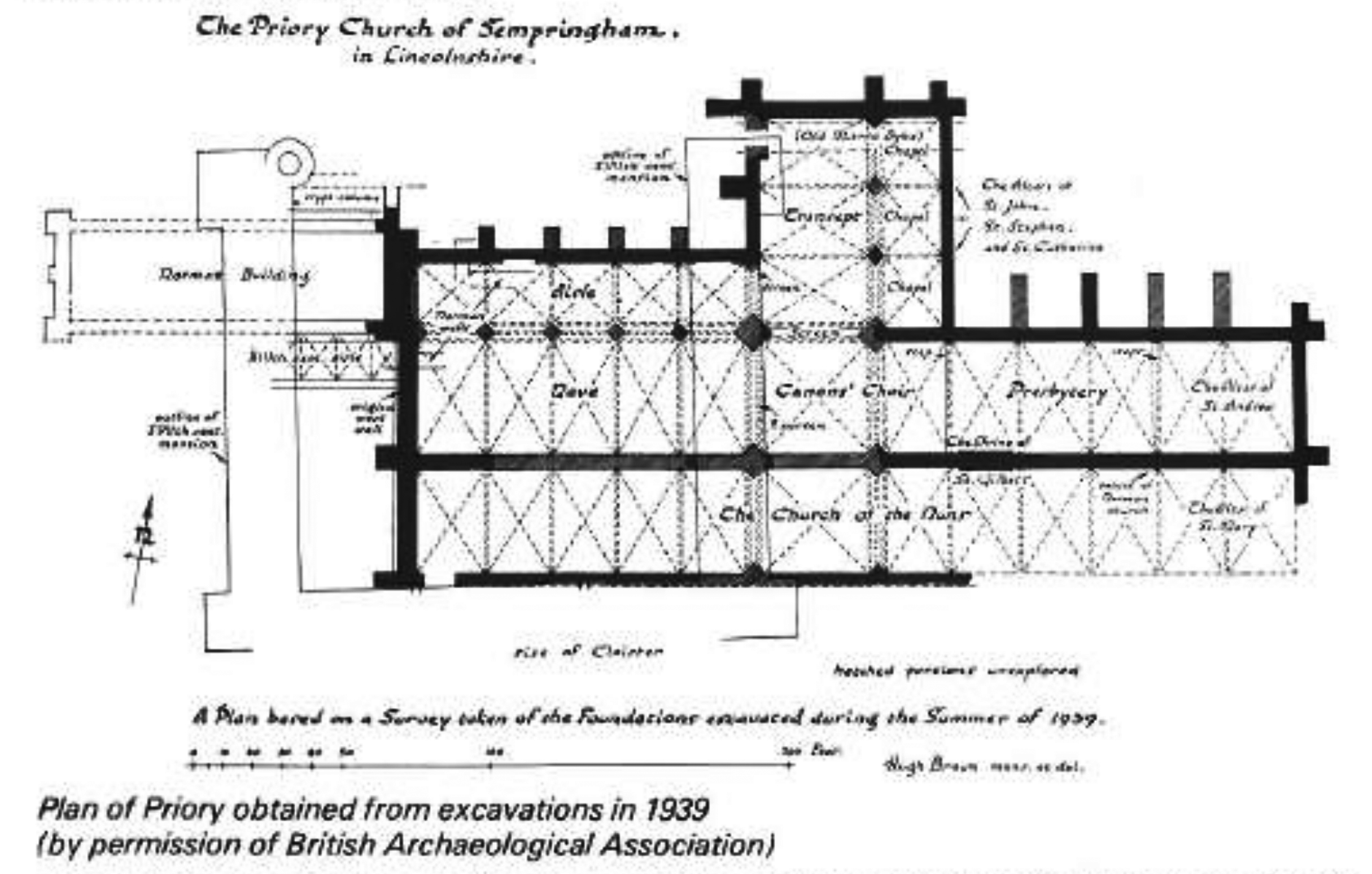
Plan of Sempringham Priory, Lincolnshire, 1939.

In 1130, Gilbert of Sempringham succeeded his father and built a dwelling and cloister for nuns to the north of the parish church of St Andrew. He subsequently introduced lay brothers, whose role was carry out manual labour. Key to the future of Gilbert's growing community, was the gift made in 1139 by Gilbert de Gant II of three carucates of land for a nunnery in the valley of the Marse Dyke in Sempringham. Three carucates would equate to approximately 360 acres. This land, which was part of the Folkingham manorial estate, gave Gilbert the site he needed to establish a formal monastic house. It also came with the rights to two mills in Folkingham.

== Later Medieval ==
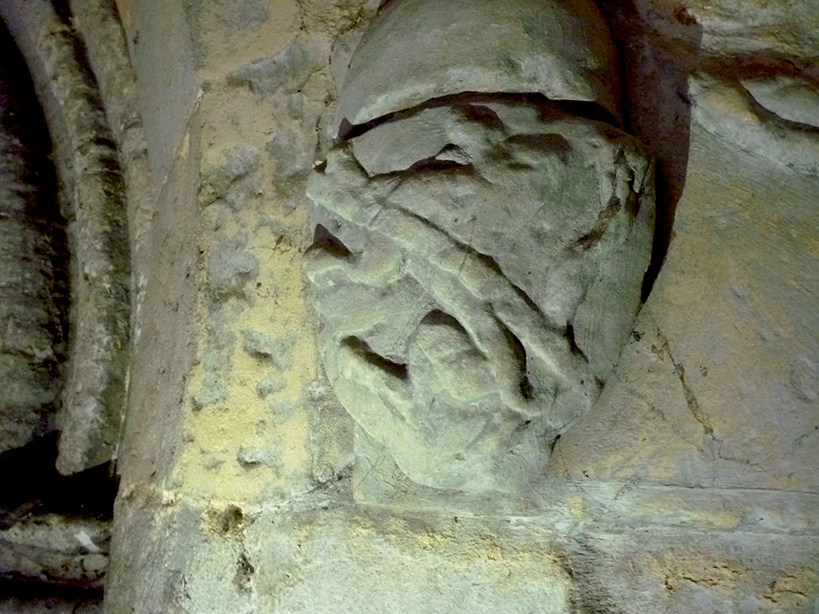
Coat of arms of the Beaumont family from a shield in the porch of St Andrew's Church.

By the time the Beaumonts took over the lordship of the manor in the early fourteenth century, Folkingham had lost all vestige of its earlier importance as a regional administrative centre.

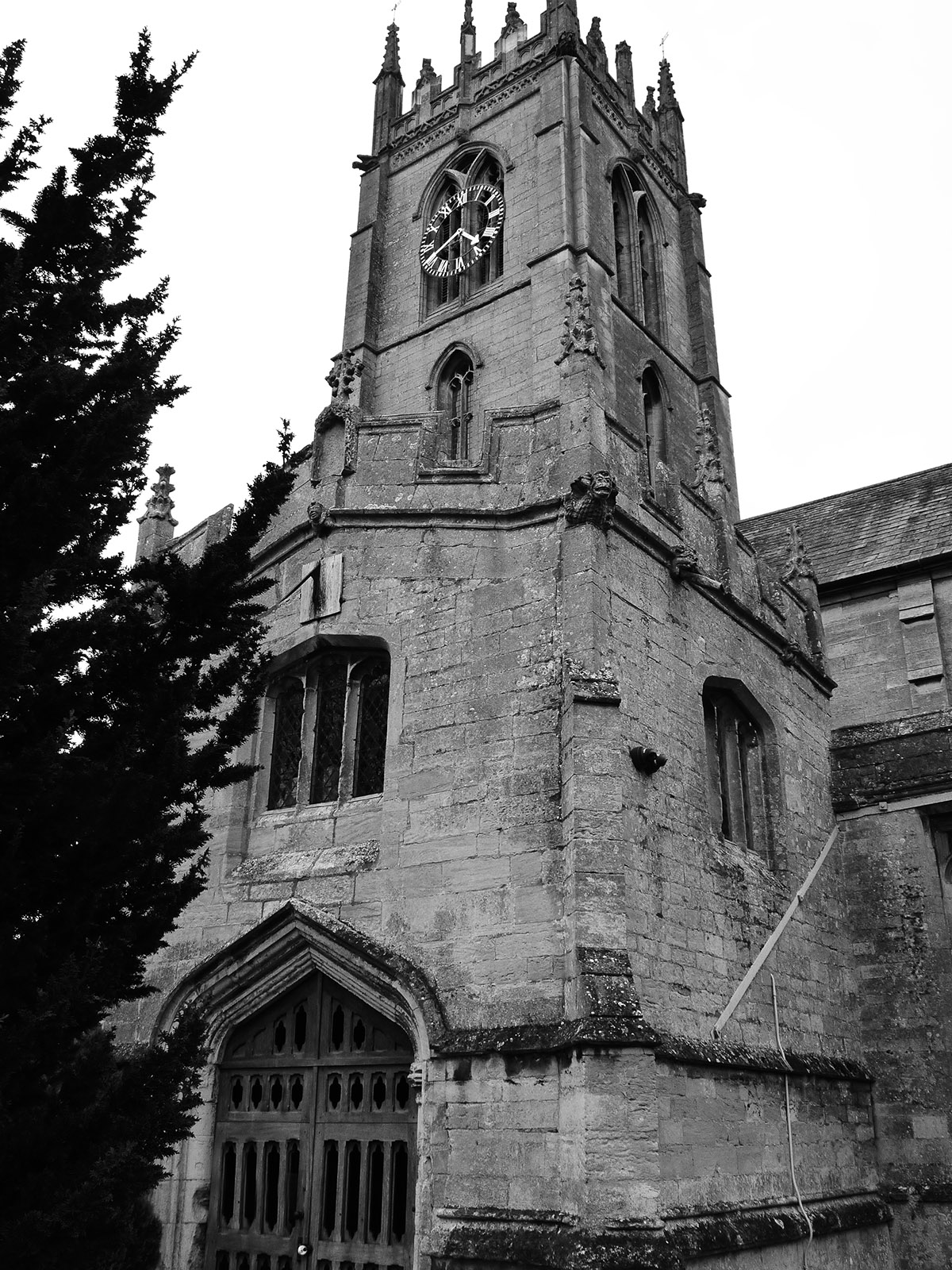
The porch and tower of St Andrew's Church were rebuilt in the 1430s under the partronage of John Beaumont and are comparable with contemporary high-quality urban church building in Stamford (Lincs.).

The Beaumonts would still have controlled property and lands within some former dependent villages, but they were now just part of the wider portfolio of a powerful baron. Even though the Beaumonts continued the tradition of Folkingham being a baronial seat, their sphere of interest was not focused on Lincolnshire. However, they did leave a legacy of their time here in the form of church building. The fourteenth- and fifteenth-century rebuilding of St Andrew’s Church remains a monument to Beaumont patronage, as revealed by the family arms which flank the entrance.

The other Beaumont legacy was the probable development of The Greyhound Inn at the top of the Market Place. As a market town, which also hosted several annual fairs, lying on the main road from Lincoln to London, it is inevitable that Folkingham would have had alehouses. It is argued that perhaps such an alehouse was developed by the Beaumonts in the fifteenth century to become an inn with a sign which professed loyalty to the house of Lancaster.

Folkingham, like many communities, was affected by some of the major events which impacted on life in the later middle ages. One of these was the notorious Black Death, which arrived into Lincolnshire in 1349. The virulent disease caused mortality rates of around 40% among the clergy, and this percentage was probably carried through to the wider community.

Another significant event, which divided rather than decimated communities, was the protracted civil war between the houses of Lancaster and York, which later became known as the Wars of the Roses. The Beaumont family were leading supporters and players for the Lancastrian side and this prominence must have placed Folkingham and its castle at some risk. It ended with the 2nd Viscount Beaumont being incapacitated and the castle, after seesawing between Beaumont and Yorkist ownership, falling into ruin.

== Post-Reformation ==
Folkingham, in common with all settlements in England, experienced a series of profound changes during the sixteenth century. It witnessed the end of the medieval world and the birth of a new age under a new ruling dynasty, where a fledgling Protestant church was ascendant and where secular ambition was championed and rewarded.

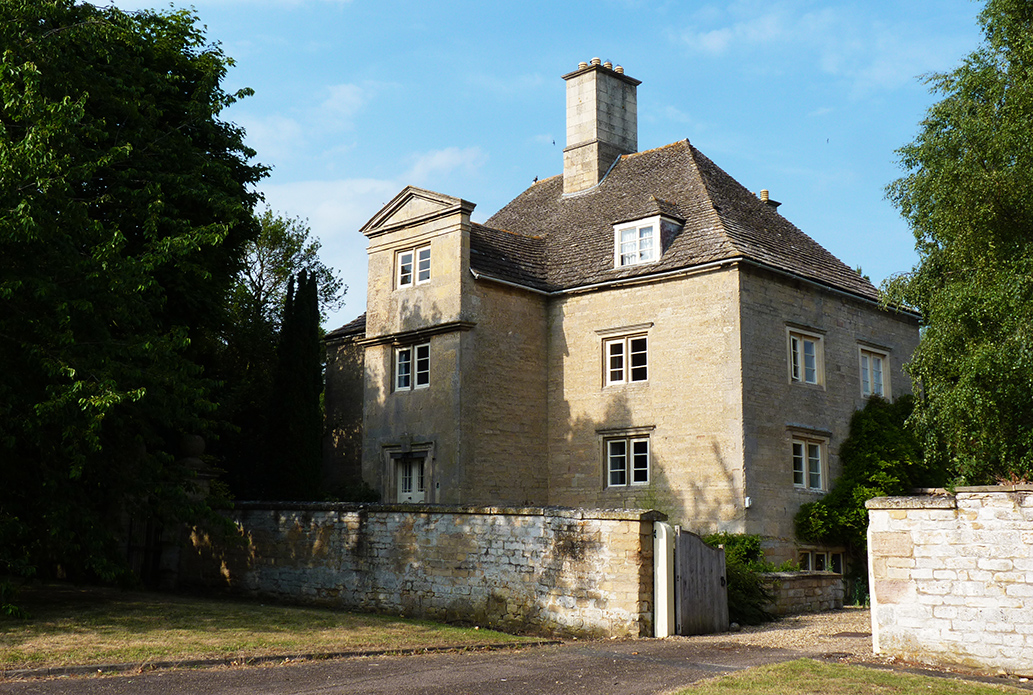
Folkingham Manor House, built in c.1652 by Theophilus Clinton, 4th Earl of Lincoln, probably as a wedding present for his son, Edward. The house is an Artisan Mannerist style, combining classical innovations with older vernacular motifs.

In Folkingham, the great medieval dynasties, which had used the town as their caput and dominated its affairs, were extinguished. In their place came absentee aristocratic owners, for whom Folkingham was just one of their many estates. As a result, the castle fell into ruin and was plundered for stone for domestic building projects. Sempringham Priory, which had been associated with the town and its barons since the twelfth century, became a victim of the dissolution in 1538, falling under the ownership of Edward Clinton.

Sempringham was chosen by the Clintons as the site for their principal residence in the region, a decision related, no doubt, to convenient source of building materials which could be salvaged from the Priory. It was only in the seventeenth century that the town began to find its feet again and experience a new wave of building, most notably the subsidiary Manor House of the Clintons, built in period of the Commonwealth in an Artisan Mannerist style, and The Greyhound Inn at the top of the Market Place. But Folkingham would have to wait until the end of the eighteenth century before any attempt was made to truly revive its fortunes.

== Into the Georgian Age ==
The 1690s brought change to all parts of Britain following the engineered coup of William and Mary to the English throne. In Folkingham, the Clintons sold off their interests in 1691 to pay mounting debts and the manor was bought by Richard Wynn, a London lawyer who later became MP for Boston. He seems to have undertaken some measures to improve the town, with the rebuilding of The Greyhound and several estate farms including Spring Farm and Low Farm.

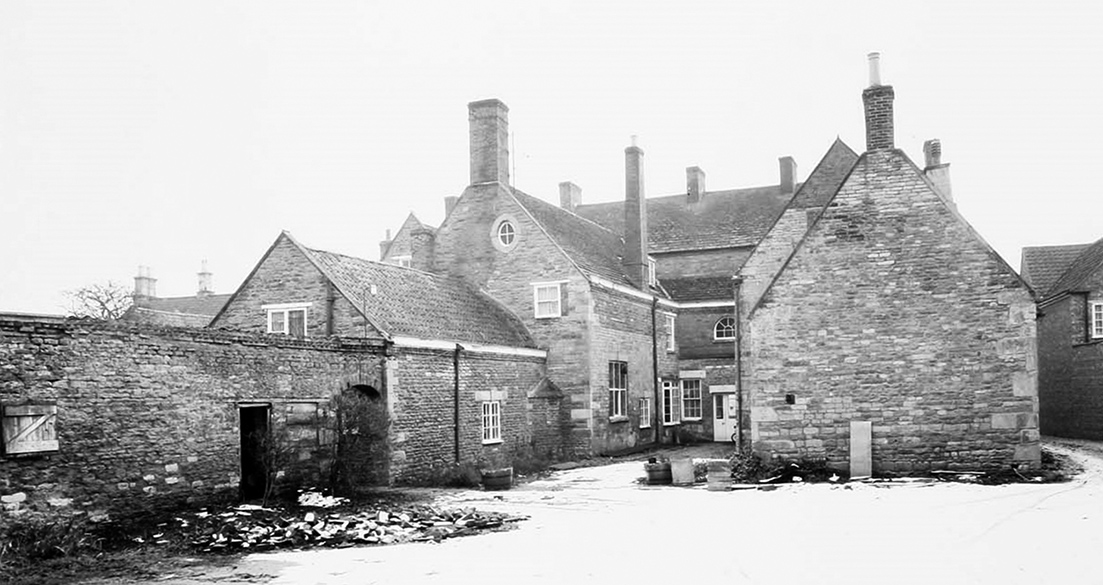
Rear stone-built ranges of The Greyhound Inn, rebuilt by Richard Wynn in the 1690s.

But this impetus was not continued by subsequent generations. The second Richard Wynne decamped to Italy and the third ended up in debts which forced the eventual sale of the manor in 1788. Dr Richard Yerburgh, writing in 1825, paints a picture of dereliction in the early Georgian town: ‘At the former period it consisted of little else than a mass of irregularly built and dirty looking thatched cottages; even the Inn itself was but a miserable hovel, compared with the present elegant structure. In the middle of the market-place was a large pond, on each side of which were usually laid enormous piles of timber. Nearly opposite the Green Man public house, stood the Market-cross, Butchery, and Town-hall, which seemed to have been erected at a period when elegancy and conveniency received little or no attention. On the opposite side of the market-place stood the House of Correction. Added to the above, the market-place contained two wells from which the inhabitants obtained their usual supply of water'.

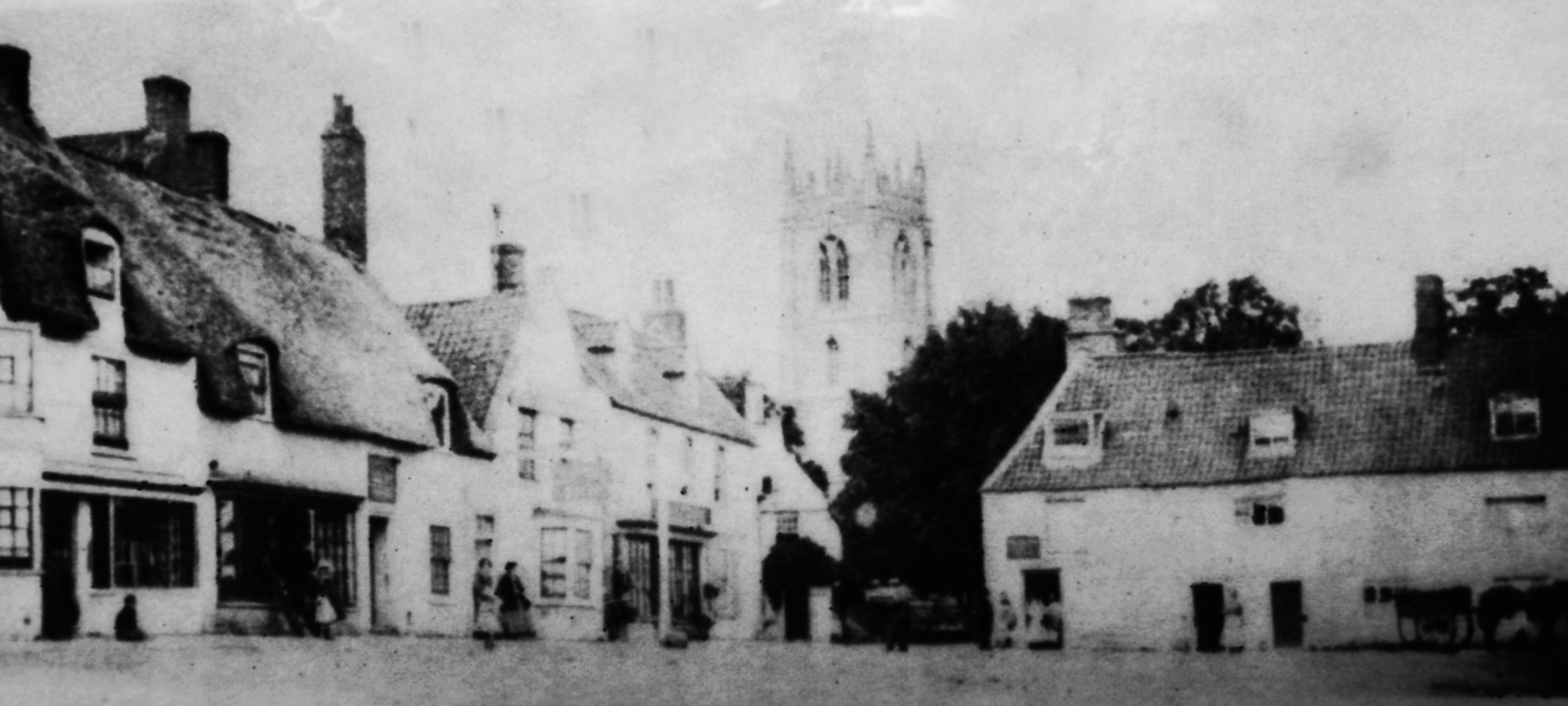
Green Man public house in Market Place - the thatched building on the left.

However, this account should be viewed with a degree of caution. Folkingham was on the network of roads served by the developing coaching and carrier trades, with routes stretching north to Lincoln, Horncastle and Louth and south to Peterborough and London. Certainly, The Greyhound inn became a substantial coaching inn before the Heathcote remodeling, hardly according with the derogatory term ‘hovel’.

Folkingham got its first grammar school in 1714, when the Rev. Richard Brocklesby provided funds to establish an institution providing free education for boys whose parents received parochial aid. Brocklesby was among the clergy who refused to swear allegiance to William III after the Glorious Revolution. The school room was located across the western part of the church, occupying the aisles and base of the tower and was divided from it by ‘mean boarding’.

In the Georgian period and through the nineteenth century, the town had an alternative spelling of Falkingham. The first known instance of the use of the ‘a’ in the town’s spelling is from the distance chart of c.1643 where it is called both Folkingham and Falkingham. Its adoption was perhaps an attempt to distance the pronunciation of the town away from a well-known swear word.

== Heathcote's Town ==
In 1788 the manor of Folkingham, including Stow and Threekingham, was purchased by the trustees of the Heathcote estate (of Normanton Hall, Rutland) as part of a programme of property acquisition in the region. So began a reimagining of the town on a scale to surpass the interventions of previous proprietors.

The result of this work still defines the predominantly Georgian character of the Market Place - it is by no means a set-piece, but it is an elegant space. The set piece was undoubtedly the remodeling of The Greyhound at the top of the Market Place. The aim was evidently to create a fashionable inn which would meet the expectations of travellers and operators involved in the burgeoning coaching trade along the Lincoln to London. The effect of Heathcote investment, though, went further than aesthetics and property. It revitalised the town. Whether the gesture was philanthropic, or one born from more commercial considerations, its effect was certainly one of gentrification - a town emerging from rural obscurity into the age of enlightenment. The window tax returns for 1796 reflect this investment, with seventy-three for Folkingham, compared with just twenty-five for Threekingham. The longer term effects were a gradual increase in population and prosperity through the early nineteenth century, boosted by the expansion of the coaching and carrier trades.

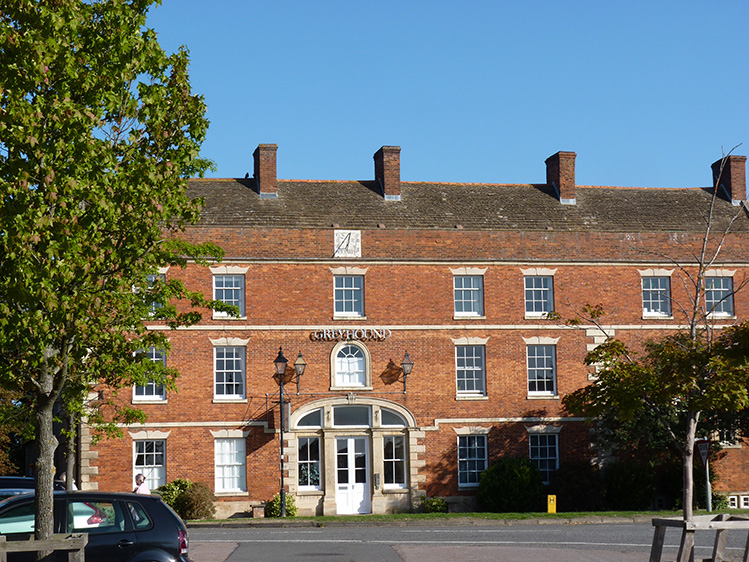
The south front of The Greyhound was rebuilt in red brick with stone dressings, including distinctive moustached lintels, following the purchase of the Folkingham estate by the Heathcote family in 1788.

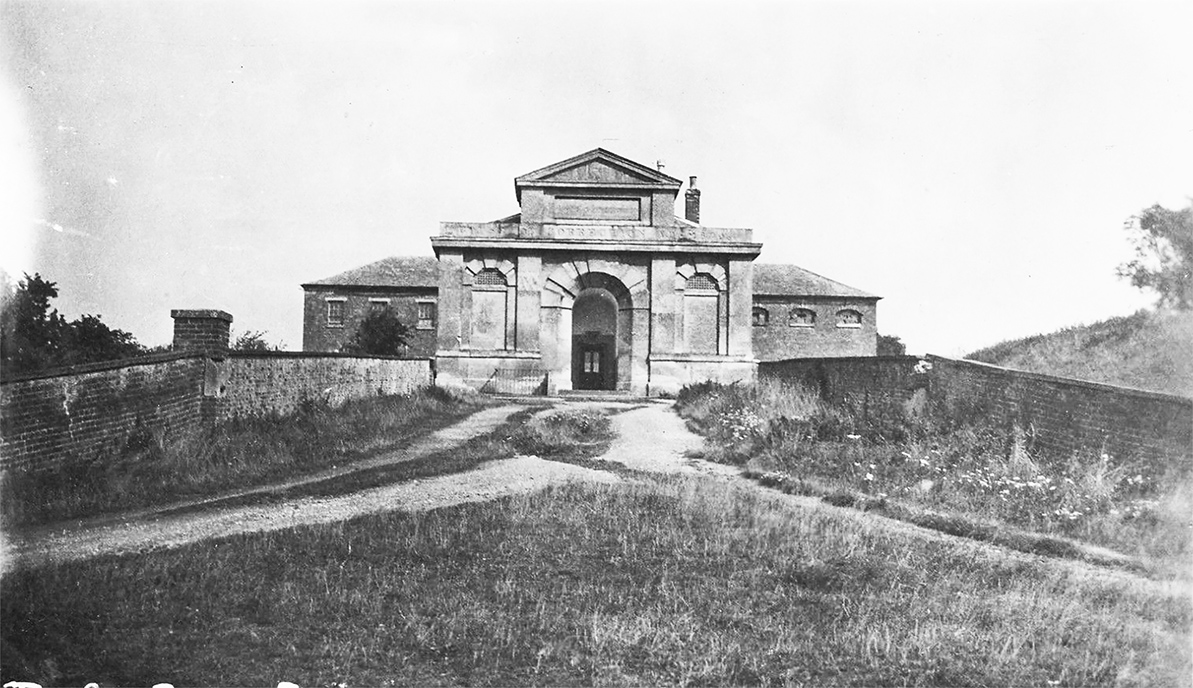
Bryan Browning's 1825 gatehouse of the House of Correction seen from the entrance on Billingborough Road. A brick prison range can be seen behind.

However, this renaissance was relatively short-lived. If Gilbert Heathcote did have concerns over whether Folkingham could be restored to a prosperous market town, then these were well-placed. Although there was a gradual growth in trade and population, it was not significant. By the 1820s there were reports that the town had little trade and whatever optimism remained was finally extinguished by the arrival of the railway and end of the halcyon days of long-distance coach travel. The Folkingham estate would ultimately end up under the administration of lesser members of the Heathcote family until its eventual disposal in 1920.

In the 1770s, John Howard, a Bedfordshire philanthropist, campaigned for the improvement of prisons, publishing his findings in the influential The State of the Prisons in 1777. Folkingham’s House of Correction on Market Place was among those which was found inadequate. A solution to build a new purpose-built prison emerged when the Heathcote estate sold the site of the keep of the castle to the Kesteven judicial authority. Work started in 1808. The moated inner ward lent itself perfectly to the creation of a new walled compound, but instead of using the old castle entrance, a new south-facing access was created off Billingborough Road. Stamford architect Bryan Browning, was commissioned to build a severe and imposing gatehouse and turnkey’s lodge in 1825, using stone quarried from nearby Newton. The associated sessions court moved from a free-standing building into the assembly room of The Greyhound, but was removed from there in 1828, as by then a hostelry was seen as an unfit place for the administration of justice.

== Notable buildings ==
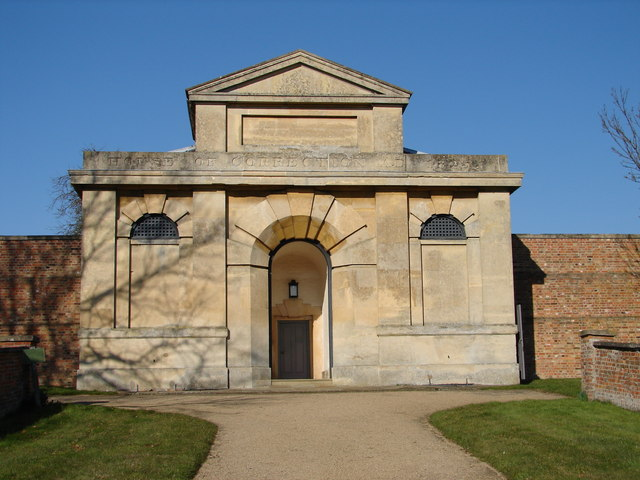
Gate of the House of Correction by Bryan Browning

=== The House of Correction ===
In the early 19th century Folkingham was part of Quarter Sessions, the higher court that dispensed justice for the area, which explains why a House of Correction, or minor prison, was built. It was constructed on the site of Folkingham Castle. The surviving Grade II* listed buildings consist of the original 19th-century governor's house and gateway, dating from 1808 and 1825. It was closed in 1878 but was taken over in about 1980 by the Landmark Trust, which converted the Gateway into a holiday home.

=== The Greyhound ===
The Greyhound, once a coaching inn, dates back to 1650. It has since been converted into flats. It is a Grade II* listed building.

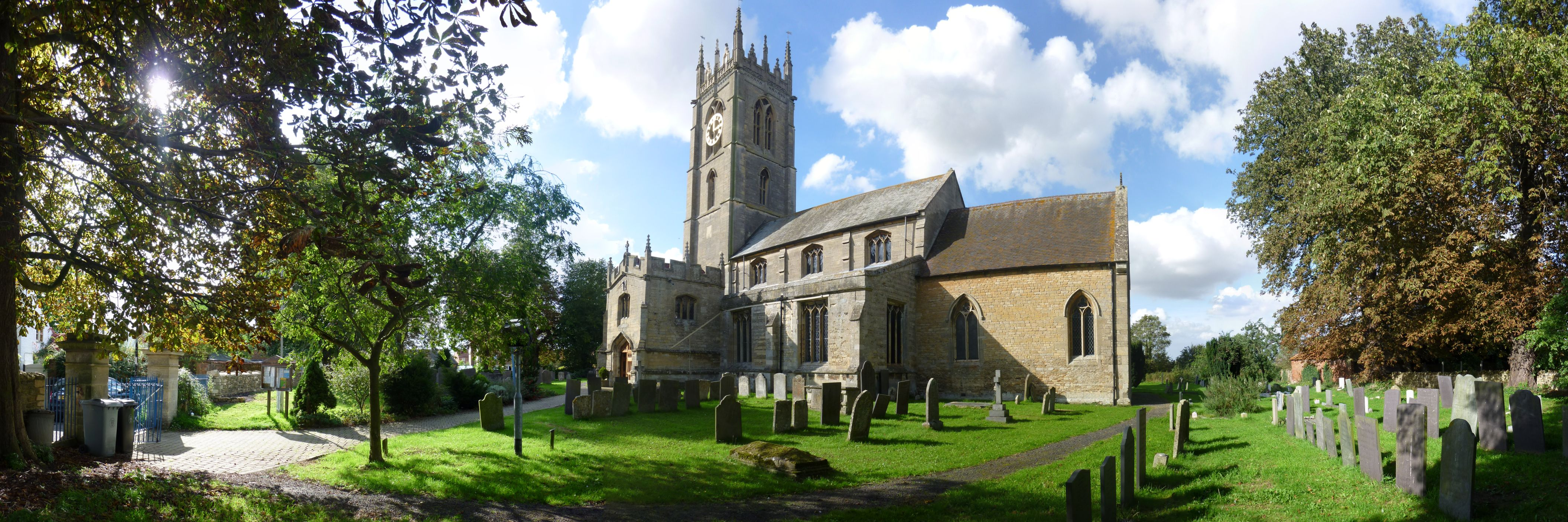
St. Andrew's Church

=== Parish church ===
The Church of England parish church of Saint Andrew originates from the late 12th century and was largely completed by the late 15th, with restorations carried out in 1825, 1858 and 1860. It has early Decorated Gothic arcades and a mainly Early English chancel, with a Norman pier where there was an opening into a chantry chapel. On the south side of the church are the remains of stocks and a whipping-post. The church is a Grade I listed building.

The church is a prominent feature of the village, but is inconspicuous from the Market Place. In 2006 gale force winds blew down two of the four pinnacles, one of which fell onto the roof causing damaging costing more than £100,000 to repair. Folkingham parish is part of the South Lafford Group of parishes in the Lafford Deanery, Diocese of Lincoln.

=== Folkingham Manor ===
Folkingham Manor House is located just off the Market place in the centre of Folkingham. It was built for Lord Clinton in the 17th century, out of stone taken from the castle.

== Public transport ==
There is a daily express coach service to London and Hull. There are one to three buses per weekday to Grantham, one per weekday to Bourne and Sleaford, and an extra Sleaford run on schooldays. The nearest railway station is at Heckington (11 miles (18 km).

Lincolnshire County Council operates a pre-booking bus service from the village to nearby towns and back.

== Notable people ==
- Elizabeth Wynne Fremantle (1779–1857), the main author of The Wynne Diaries.
- Ethel Rudkin (1893-1985), folklorist and archaeologist, married George Rudkin from the village.
