= Sir Thomas Maule of Panmure =

Baron of Panmure and Benvie and Marion Fleming

Sir Thomas Maule Baron of Panmure and Benvie
- Died: 24 July 1411; Harlaw near Inverurie
- Spouse: Elizabeth Gray of Fowlis
- Children: Thomas Maule
- Parent(s): William Maule; Marion Fleming

Thomas Maule, 2nd Baron of Panmure and Benvie, was the eldest son of Sir William Maule, Baron of Panmure and Benvie and Marion Fleming. Thomas succeeded as Baron on his father's death before 1407. He was killed on 24 July 1411 at the Battle of Harlaw, fighting under Alexander Stewart, Earl of Mar. He is mentioned in the Child ballad, The Battle of Harlaw:

And thair the knicht of Lawriston
Was slain into his armour schene,
And gude Sir Robert Davidson,
Wha provost was of Aberdene:
The knicht of Panmure, as was sene,
A mortall man in armour bricht,
Sir Thomas Murray, stout and kene,
Left to the warld thair last gude nicht.

He left one son, Thomas Maule, who succeeded him as Baron.
