= Thomas Maule of Panmure =

William Maule Baron of Panmure and Benvie
- Died: 1450
- Spouse: Mary Abercrombie
- Children: Thomas Maule
- Parent(s): Sir Thomas Maule; Elizabeth Gray of Fowlis

Thomas Maule, 3rd Baron of Panmure and Benvie, (c. 1411 — 1450) was the eldest son of Sir Thomas Maule, Baron of Panmure and Benvie, who was killed at the Battle of Harlaw in 1411 and Elizabeth Gray of Fowlis. Thomas succeeded as Baron on his father's death while still a child, and his affairs were administered by his grandfather, Sir Andrew Gray of Fowlis, until he came of age.

In 1437, following the regicide of James I of Scotland, Thomas Maule laid claim to the barony of Brechin-Barclay. Walter Stewart, Earl of Atholl, who was executed for his role in the assassination, had possessed the lands after the death of Margaret Barclay, his wife and the heiress to the barony. The succession of the barony of Brechin-Barclay had not been formally carried out, and Atholl's heir, David Stewart had died prior to the murder of the king. Thus the line of succession had passed to the descendants of Margaret Barclay's aunt, Jane Barclay. Thomas Maule, her great-grandson, had the greatest claim, but was only able to take possession of part of it, most being annexed by the crown.

He was married to Mary Abercrombie, daughter of Sir Thomas Abercrombie, and was succeeded as baron by his son, Thomas Maule, 4th Baron of Panmure and Benvie (c. 1430 at Forfar, Angus — 16 January 1498).
