= Peter de Valognes =

11th-century Norman nobleman

Peter de Valognes (Note: Also Piers de Valognes, or Valoignes.) (1045–1110) was a Norman noble who became a great landowner in England following his part as a commander in the 1066 Norman conquest of England.

== Land holdings ==
Between 1070 and 1076, Peter de Valognes was granted lands in the six counties of Hertfordshire, Cambridgeshire, Norfolk, Suffolk, Essex and Lincolnshire. In 1086, when the Domesday book was completed, Peter was sheriff of the counties of Essex and Hertfordshire and he farmed the boroughs of Havering and Hertford. Peter de Valognes made his caput in Benington in Hertfordshire where a motte-and-bailey castle was built in the late 11th or early 12th century. Peter's most valuable lands however, were in Norfolk, the latter being a later grant at the forfeiture of Ralph de Guader after the revolt of the Earls in 1075.

== Binham Priory ==
Peter de Valognes was the founder of Binham Priory in North Norfolk in 1091, which was built on land given to him by William the Conqueror. The land on which the priory stands was, according to the Domesday Book, originally the property of a freeman named Esket.

== Marriage and issue ==
Peter de Valognes married Albreda de Rie, the sister of Eudo the Dapifer, and they are known to have had the following children:

- Roger de Valognes, Lord of Benington, married Agnes, daughter of John FitzRichard, had issue.
- Robert, married Agnes de Clavering, daughter of John fitz Nigel, had issue.
- Peter, married Aubrey, daughter of William FitzNeel, Lord of Halton, and Agnes de Widness, had issue.
- William, died without legitimate heirs.
- Muriel, married firstly William de Bachetone and secondly Hubert de Munchensy, had issue.
- daughter, married Alfred of Attleborough, had issue.

== Sources ==
- Le Strange, Richard (1973). Monasteries of Norfolk. King's Lynn, UK: Yates.
- Parkin, Charles (1809). An essay towards a topographical history of the county of Norfolk. Vol. 3. Oxford University.
