= Benington Castle =

Ruined castle in Hertfordshire, England

Coordinates: 51.89589°N 0.11793°W

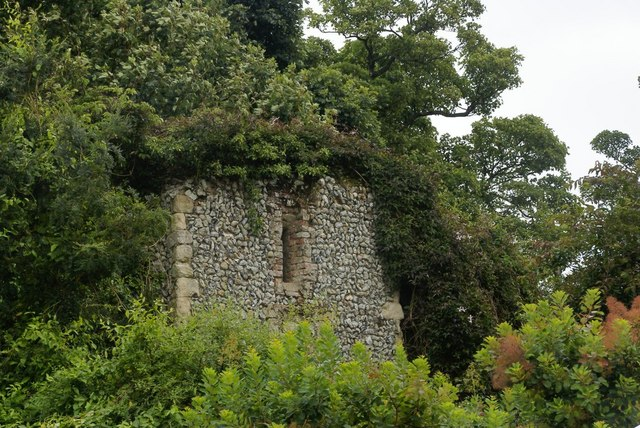
Benington Castle folly

Benington Castle is a ruined castle in the village of Benington, near Stevenage in Hertfordshire, England at grid reference TL296236. It has been protected since 1936 as a scheduled monument.

A motte-and-bailey castle was built in the late 11th or early 12th century, founded by Peter de Valognes. In 1136, Roger de Valognes built a stone castle with a keep. In 1177, King Henry II ordered that the tower be demolished (slighted). According to historian Sidney Painter it was one of at least 21 castles slighted on the orders of Henry II.

In 1192 the castle was in use again. It was finally destroyed in 1212, after Robert Fitzwalter rebelled against King John. Only the foundations of the keep and some earthworks now remain from the original structure.

== Benington Lordship ==
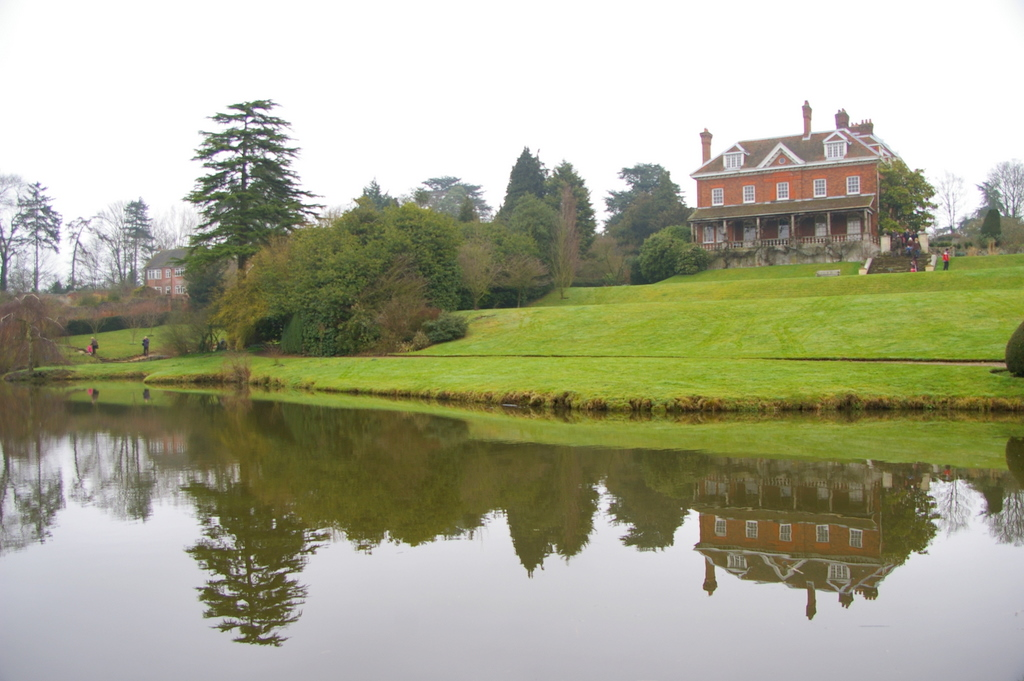

The site of the castle has been modified by the construction of a Georgian house, Benington Lordship, and the landscaping of its gardens. In 1832, George Proctor added a neo-Norman gatehouse, summerhouse and curtain wall.

=== Gardens ===
The park and gardens of Benington Lordship are listed as Grade II on the Register of Parks and Gardens. The gardens occupy 7 acres and have been praised by the gardening correspondent of the Financial Times.

A stream which has been dammed appears to have formed part of the medieval defences, but its present appearance is the result of later landscaping.

== St Peter's Church ==
The nearby medieval church of St Peter is also set within a bailey, but it is not included within the boundaries of the ancient monument as defined by Historic England. The church is protected by its own heritage listing (Grade I).

== Access ==
The castle is in the grounds of Benington Lordship, which is privately owned. Public access is provided on a limited basis, for example under the auspices of the National Gardens Scheme.
