= Folkingham Castle =

Castle in Lincolnshire, England

- Folkingham, Lincolnshire, England
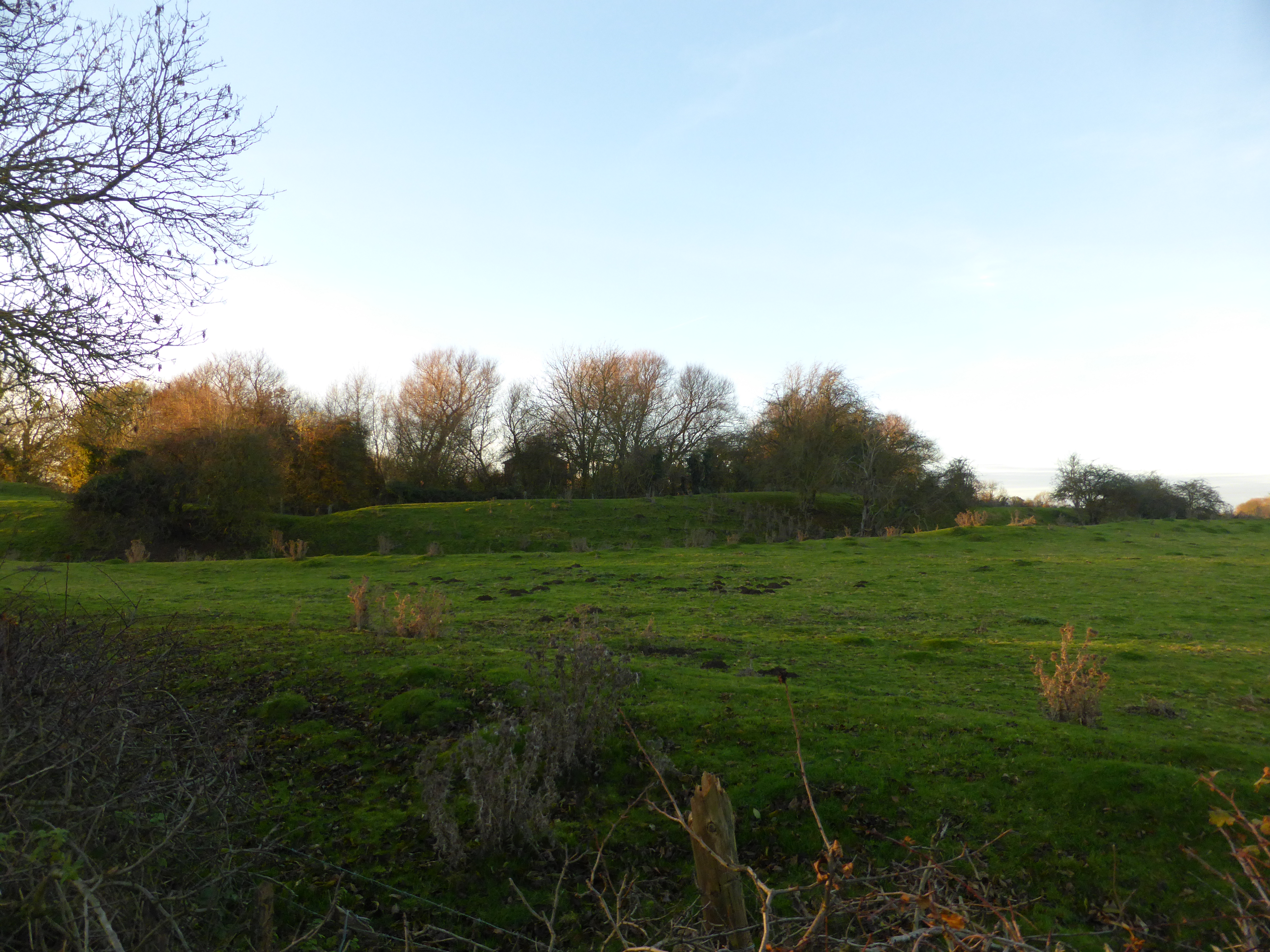
- Earthworks of Folkingham Castle in 2013

Site information
- Condition: Ruined

Location
- Coordinates: 52.88833°N 0.40444°W
- Grid reference: grid reference TF 07444 33516

Folkingham Castle is located near the village of Folkingham, Lincolnshire, England. The castle was the caput baroniae of the barony of Folkingham.

A motte-and-bailey castle was constructed around the late 11th century by Gilbert de Gant, a Flemish soldier in William the Conqueror’s retinue. After the death of his descendant Gilbert de Gaunt, Baron Gaunt in 1297 without issue, the castle passed to the crown.

The castle was then granted to Henry de Beaumont. Edward II, granted Henry a licence to crenellate the castle in 1312. The rectangular inner bailey, surrounded by a moat, with a larger outer bailey, is probably attributable to the Beaumont family.

During the 19th century a correction house was built inside the castle. This house was demolished in the 1950s.
