= William de Valognes =

Scottish noble

Sir William de Valognes Lord Chamberlain of Scotland Baron of Panmure
- Arms of William de Valognes; Paly wavy of six argent and gules
- Died: 1219
- Resting place: Melrose Abbey
- Spouse: Lora de Quincy
- Children: Christina de Valognes; Lora de Valognes; Isabel de Valognes
- Parent: Philip de Valognes

William de Valognes also known as William de Valoynes, was the only son of Philip de Valognes and was granted a charter of the baronies of Panmure and Benvie by King William the Lion, previously granted to his father. On his father's death in 1215, William de Valongnes was made High Chamberlain to Alexander II. He died in 1219 and was interred at Melrose Abbey.

== Marriage and issue ==
William married Lora de Quincy, daughter of Saer de Quincy, 1st Earl of Winchester and Margaret de Beaumont. They had three daughters;

- Christina, married Peter Maule of Fowlis, passing the Baronies of Panmure and Benvie into the Maule family; had issue.
- Lora, married Henry de Balliol, passing the position of Lord Chamberlain of Scotland into the Balliol family; had issue.
- Isabel, married David Comyn, passing the Barony of Kilbride into the Comyn family; had issue.

Preceded by Philip de Valognes	Chamberlain of Scotland; 1215–1219	Succeeded by Henry de Balliol
