= William Maule of Panmure =

Scottish Baron of Panmure and Benvie

William Maule Baron of Panmure and Benvie
- Died: Before 1407
- Spouse: Marion Fleming of Biggar
- Children: Thomas Maule; Janet Maule
- Parent: Sir Walter Maule

William Maule (fl.1348-) was the eldest son of Sir Walter Maule, Baron of Panmure and Benvie. William succeeded as Baron in 1348 on his father's death. He married Marion Fleming of Biggar, daughter of Lady Jane Barclay of Brechin. He died before 1407 and left one son, Thomas Maule, who succeeded him as Baron, and one daughter, Janet Maule, who married Alexander Ochterlony of Kenny.
