= Edmund Comyn =

Scottish nobleman

Edmund Comyn Lord of Kilbride
- Died: 23–24 June 1314
- Spouse: Maria
- Children: Euphemia Maria
- Parent: William Comyn, Lord of Kilbride Euphemia de Clavering

Sir Edmund Comyn of Kilbride (died 1314) was a 13th- and 14th-century Scottish noble, owner of Kilbride Castle. He was a younger son of William Comyn of Kilbride and Euphemia de Clavering.

== Life ==
He succeeded to his brother John's estates after John died without an heir. He fought, beside his cousins the Earl of Buchan and the Lord of Badenoch, at the Battle of Dunbar on 27 April 1296, where he was captured and became a prisoner of King Edward I of England until 1297 at Nottingham Castle. He was released from captivity and fought during Edward I's campaign in Flanders in 1297–98. He led a Scottish army with Simon Fraser crossing into England on 18 June 1303 to lay waste the countryside around Carlisle. He was forfeited of his lands in Fakenham Apes, Suffolk, England; however, he regained them after his submission to Edward I. He was stripped of his Scottish estates and titles by King Robert I of Scotland in 1306. Edmund died fighting on the English side during the Battle of Bannockburn on 23–24 June 1314.

== Family and issue ==
Edmund married Maria, and had the following known issue:

- Euphemia, married William de la Beche; had issue.
- Mary
