= January Maull =

Post-Civil War politician in Alabama

January Maull, also known as Jany and whose surname is sometimes spelled Maul, was a state legislator in Alabama during the Reconstruction era. He served in the Alabama House of Representatives in 1873. He represented Lowndes County.

The Montgomery Advertiser listed Maull among others it derisively accused of corruptly supporting George E. Spencer. U.S. Senator Spencer and U.S. Senator Willard Warner were competing. Hearings were held and insinuations of bribery made against various legislators including Maull.

He lived in Benton, Alabama, an area settled on land owned by James Maull and initially known as Maull's Landing before being renamed and incorporated as Benton in 1834, in Lowndes County. He served in the Alabama House of Representatives in 1873. He was described as being illiterate.

He and Charles F. Hrabowski signed a letter about election issues.

== See also ==
- List of African-American officeholders during Reconstruction
