= David Comyn, Lord of Kilbride =

David Comyn Lord of Kilbride
- Died: 1247
- Spouse: Isabel de Valognes
- Children: William Comyn, Lord of Kilbride
- Parent: William Comyn, Lord of Badenoch Sarah Fitzhugh

David Comyn, Lord of Kilbride was a son of William Comyn, Lord of Badenoch, later the Earl of Buchan, and inherited the barony of Kilbride from his wife Isobel, the daughter of William de Valognes. He died in 1247.

== Life ==
David was a younger son of William Comyn, Earl of Buchan and Lord of Badenoch and his first wife Sarah Fitzhugh. David was requested to join King Henry III of England's expedition into France in 1230; however, he paid scutage to not provide military service.

== Marriage and issue ==
David married Isobel, the daughter of William de Valognes; they had the following known issue:

- William – married Euphemia de Clavering, had issue
