= John Maul =

English clergyman and cricketer

John Broughton Maul (28 November 1857 – 5 November 1931) was an English clergyman and a cricketer who played in one first-class cricket match for Cambridge University in 1878. He was born at Newport Pagnell, Buckinghamshire and died at Banbury, Oxfordshire.

Maul was educated at Uppingham School, where he was captain of the cricket team, and at Clare College, Cambridge. A right-handed lower-order batsman and a right-arm slow bowler in the round-arm bowling style, he did well in the freshmen's trial cricket match at Cambridge with seven wickets, but was given only one match for the first eleven cricket team, the game against the Gentlemen of England side; he failed to score in the only Cambridge innings and bowled six overs in the second Gentlemen innings, taking a single wicket.

Maul graduated from Cambridge University in 1881 and immediately was ordained in the Church of England. He served as curate at Ryhope, County Durham, from 1881 to 1889 when he moved to the parish of Laidley with Gatton in Queensland, Australia, where he was incumbent to 1894. After that, he took no further parish responsibilities, but, returning to England, he was permitted to officiate in church services from 1914 in the diocese of Gloucester and later in London.
