= John fitzRichard =

11th- and 12th-century Anglo-Norman nobleman

- Issue: Pain; Eustace; William; Alice; Agnes
- Father: Richard fitz Ranulf

John fitzRichard (fl. 1076) was an Anglo-Norman nobleman who became a landowner in England following the Norman Conquest. He was known as John Monoculus.

== Biography ==
John was a son of Richard fitzRanulf, and nephew of Waleran fitzRanulf, whose father Ranulf "the Moneyer" had bought the mill at Vains, Normandy in 1035. A 14th-century document from the cartulary of Malton priory refers to John as the brother of Serlo de Burgo, but contemporary evidence indicates this is probably false. John, who was apparently born by 1056, seized the mill at Vains in 1076. The King's Court of William I of England ruled against the seizure, returning the mill to the Abbey of Mont-Saint-Michel. In the 1086 Domesday survey, as "John, nephew of Waleran", he was reported holding Carbrooke, Hunstanton, Ringstead, Rushford, Saxlingham, Thurton, Walpole (St Andrew and St Peter) in Norfolk and Elsenham in Essex. He also held as tenant in chief: Brettenham, Griston and West Carbrooke in Norfolk.

== Marriage and issue ==
John is known to have had the following children:

- Pain fitzJohn (died 1137)
- Eustace fitzJohn (died 1157)
- William fitzJohn
- Alice, abbess of Barking Abbey
- Agnes, married Roger de Valognes
