= Sir William Maule =

Sir William Maule Baron of Panmure and Benvie
- Spouse: Ethana de Vallibus
- Children: Henry Maule
- Parent(s): Sir Peter Maule; Christina de Valognes

Sir William Maule was the eldest son of Sir Peter Maule and Christina de Valognes, Baron and Baroness of Panmure and Benvie. William succeeded as Baron in 1254 on his father's death. He was married to Ethana de Vallibus, daughter of John Vaux, Lord of Dirleton, and left one son, Henry Maule, who succeeded him as Baron.
