= Christina de Valognes =

Scottish noble

Christina de Valognes Baroness of Panmure and Benvie
- Died: 5 November 1256
- Spouse: Sir Peter Maule
- Children: Sir William Maule; Sir Thomas Maule
- Parent: William de Valognes

Christina de Valognes (died 1256), was a Scottish noble. She was the daughter and heiress of William de Valognes, Baron of Panmure and Benvie, and High Chamberlain of Scotland.

She married Sir Peter Maule of Fowlis around 1224, uniting the two Anglo-Norman families, and with him had two sons, Sir William Maule, the successor of the baronies of Panmure and Benvie, and Sir Thomas Maule, captain of Brechin Castle, who was killed in a siege led by Edward I in August 1303, during the First War of Scottish Independence.
