= Sir Thomas Maule =

Sir Thomas Maule Captain of Brechin Castle
- Died: August 9, 1303
- Parent(s): Sir Peter Maule; Christina de Valognes

Sir Thomas Maule was the youngest son of Sir Peter Maule and Christina de Valognes, Baron and Baroness of Panmure and Benvie.

He was Captain of Brechin Castle, and led the defence when the English forces, led by Edward I laid siege in July, 1303, during the First War of Independence. The defending forces purportedly held out for 20 days, before Maule was killed on the battlements by a stone hurled from a siege engine, after which the garrison yielded.
