= Peter Maule =

Eldest son of Richard Maule of Fowlis

Sir Peter Maule Baron of Panmure and Benvie
- Died: 1254
- Spouse: Christina de Valognes
- Children: Sir William Maule; Sir Thomas Maule
- Parent: Richard Maule

Sir Peter Maule (died 1254) was the eldest son of Richard Maule of Fowlis. He married Christina de Valognes, daughter and heiress of William de Valognes around 1224, passing the baronies of Panmure and Benvie into the Maule family.

Peter Maule is thought to have built Panmure Castle around 1224. Panmure Castle was the ancestral home of the Maule family until it was replaced by Panmure House in the 17th century, although it was destroyed by Andrew Murray during the Second War of Scottish Independence in 1336.

He left two sons, Sir William Maule, his successor, and Sir Thomas Maule, who was killed in the siege of Brechin castle in 1303, during the First War of Scottish Independence.
