= Panmure Castle =

- Part of Angus
- Near Carnoustie

Site information
- Type: Castle

Location
- Location in Angus, Scotland
- Coordinates: 56.528202°N 2.742879°W

Site history
- Built: c.1224
- Built by: Sir Peter Maule
- Demolished: c.1336 (rebuilt); 17th century

Panmure Castle was a castle that was located to the north-west of Muirdrum, Angus, Scotland.

The castle was owned by the de Valognes family, until the castle passed by marriage of Christina de Valognes to Peter Maule of Fowlis. The stone castle is thought to have been built by Peter Maule around 1224 and was destroyed by Andrew Murray of Avoch and Petty during the Second War of Scottish Independence in 1336. The castle was the ancestral home of the Maule family of Panmure from the 13th century to the 17th century, when it was replaced by Panmure House in the 17th century.

In 1485 Alexander Garden killed John Jamesone by throwing a stone at him from the castle, and he was forgiven by James IV for this crime in December 1507.

The ruins of the castle and moat has been designated as a Scheduled Monument by Historic Environment Scotland.
