= Benington, Hertfordshire =

Village in Hertfordshire, England

Coordinates: 51.8962°N 0.1126°W

Benington
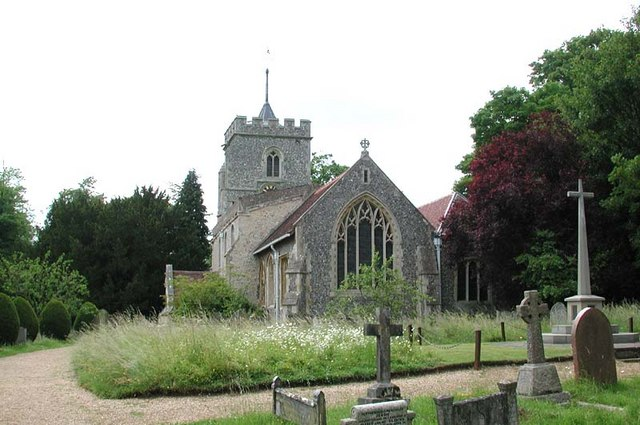
- St Peter's Church with one of its war memorials to the right

- Location within Hertfordshire
- Population: 903 (Parish, 2021)
- Civil parish: Benington
- District: East Hertfordshire
- Shire county: Hertfordshire
- Region: East
- Country: England
- Sovereign state: United Kingdom
- Post town: STEVENAGE
- Postcode district: SG2
- Dialling code: 01438
- Police: Hertfordshire
- Fire: Hertfordshire
- Ambulance: East of England
- UK Parliament: North East Hertfordshire

Benington is a village and civil parish in the East Hertfordshire district of Hertfordshire, England. It lies about 4 miles (6 km) east of Stevenage, its post town, and 35 miles (56 km) north of London. At the 2021 census the parish had a population of 903.

== History ==
There are two theories regarding the naming of the village. One comes from Saxon times and is derived from the name of the river to the west of the village - the Beane. The middle syllable 'ing' is common in place names all over south-east England and means 'people', Benington therefore meaning The Town of the Beane Folk. The second view is that Benington is a corruption of the name 'Belinton' which appears in the Domesday Book. This is thought to mean the town of Bela's people, after the name of the man who led the first group of immigrants to the area.

== Population ==
According to the 2001 census it had a population of 922. At the 2011 Census the population had reduced to 908.

== Economy ==
The village has a strong farming history, and much of the surrounding countryside is still agricultural.

== Transport ==
The village has an airstrip to the south south west—Position: N51°52.95 W000°07.37

The village is served by a local bus route, number 384, between Stevenage and Hertford, which additionally links it to Walkern, Dane End, and Tonwell.

== Local facilities ==
It has two churches

- Saint Peter's Church of England, a Grade I listed building. The churchyard contains 2 war memorials in the form of a cross (unlisted) and a lychgate (Grade II listed).
- Benington Methodist Church

There is also a primary school (Benington Church of England Primary School) and two public houses (the Lordship Arms and the Bell). The Bell is a late medieval hall house, listed grade II*.

The Old Tower is a former Victorian water tower, now converted as a private residence.

== Benington Lordship ==
Benington Lordship is a Georgian manor house which is situated to the west of the village. The grounds surrounding the house stretch over seven acres and also feature the remains of Benington Castle (a Norman motte and bailey castle).

The gardens of Benington Lordship are well known for their snowdrops and views over the surrounding Hertfordshire countryside. The gardens also feature a Victorian folly, kitchen garden, contemporary sculptures, carp pond, wildlife areas and rose gardens.

== Nature reserve ==
Benington High Wood is a Site of Special Scientific Interest.

== In popular culture ==
The 2009 psychological horror found footage short film and web series No Through Road by Steven Chamberlain follows four seventeen-year-old teenagers en-route to Stevenage who find themselves trapped in a time loop along two road signs marking an intersection between Benington and Watton.
