= Ingram de Balliol =

13th-century English noble

Arms of Lords of Tours-en-Vimeu, Urr, Redcastle and Dalton:Gules, an orle ermine.

Ingram de Balliol (died 1244), Lord of Redcastle and Urr in Scotland, Dalton in England and Tours-en-Vimeu in France was an Anglo Scoto-French noble.

He was a younger son of Eustace de Balliol and Petronilla FitzPiers. Ingram was a follower of King Alexander II of Scotland, which brought him against his brothers Hugh and Bernard, who supported Kings John and Henry III of England. He died in 1244.

== Marriage and issue ==
Ingram married Agnes, daughter and heiress of Walter de Berkeley of Redcastle. They had the following known issue.

- Eustace de Balliol of Tours.
- Ellen de Balliol (died 1281), married William de Percy of Topcliffe. Dalton passed into the Percy family.
- Henry de Balliol of Redcastle and Urr.
- Eva de Balliol, married Robert de Umfraville of Collerton, had issue.
