= Eustace de Balliol =

13th century English noble

Eustace de Balliol (or Eustace de Helicourt) (died c. 1209) was the cousin and successor of Bernard II de Balliol, lord of Balliol and Barnard Castle. He was the lord of Hélicourt in Picardy, an estate near the chief seat of the main Balliol line at Bailleul-en-Vimeu; after his cousin died childless, in 1190 Eustace de Helicourt took over those estates and remarried.

In 1189–95 he quitclaimed the manor of Long Newton, Durham to Hugh du Puiset, Bishop of Durham, as well as all the land that Bernard de Balliol held in the vill of Newhouse. In 1199–1200, as heir of Bernard de Balliol, he rendered account of 60 marks for his scutage, of which he had paid 10 marks; he also owed £120 for the second and third scutages of King Richard I, which was remitted by brief of King John. Sometime in the period, 1199–1205, he confirmed to St. Mary's, York the advowsons of the churches of Gainford and Stainton, Durham and Stokesley, Yorkshire and their tithes which Guy de Balliol previously granted them. In 1200 he and his son, Hugh, quitclaimed by fine to Robert, Abbot of York the advowsons of the church of Gainford, Durham, and the chapels of Barnard Castle, Middleton, Denton, Houghton-le-Side, and Snow Hall (in Gainford), Durham.

He and his first wife, Petronilla FitzPiers, had four known sons, all of whom appeared in the Durham Liber Vitae: Hugh, Enguerrand (Ingram or Ingelram), Bernard, and Henry; his eldest son Hugh succeeded him, while his younger sons Enguerrand and Henry gained the patronage of the Scottish kings and founded Scottish cadet branches based at Inverkeilor (Enguerrand) and at Cavers (Henry). Eustace's son Hugh had succeeded him by around 1209.

== Notes ==
Preceded by Bernard II	Lord of Balliol	Succeeded by Hugh
