= Bernard de Balliol =

Bernard de Balliol may refer to:

- Bernard I de Balliol (died 1154 x 1162), Anglo-Picard baron who supposedly founded Barnard Castle
- Bernard II de Balliol (died c. 1190), Anglo-Picard baron who led the capture of William the Lion, King of the Scots, in 1174
