= Barnard Castle (castle) =

Castle in England that gave its name to the nearby town of the same name

Coordinates: 54°32′36″N 1°55′36″W

- Barnard Castle, County Durham, England
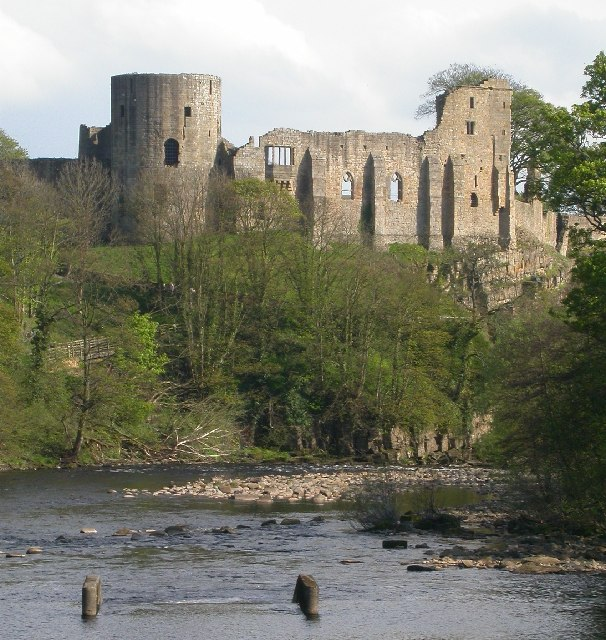
- Barnard Castle above the River Tees

Site information
- Owner: English Heritage
- Open to the public: Yes

Location
- Shown within County Durham
- Grid reference: grid reference NZ04911641

Site history
- Materials: Stone

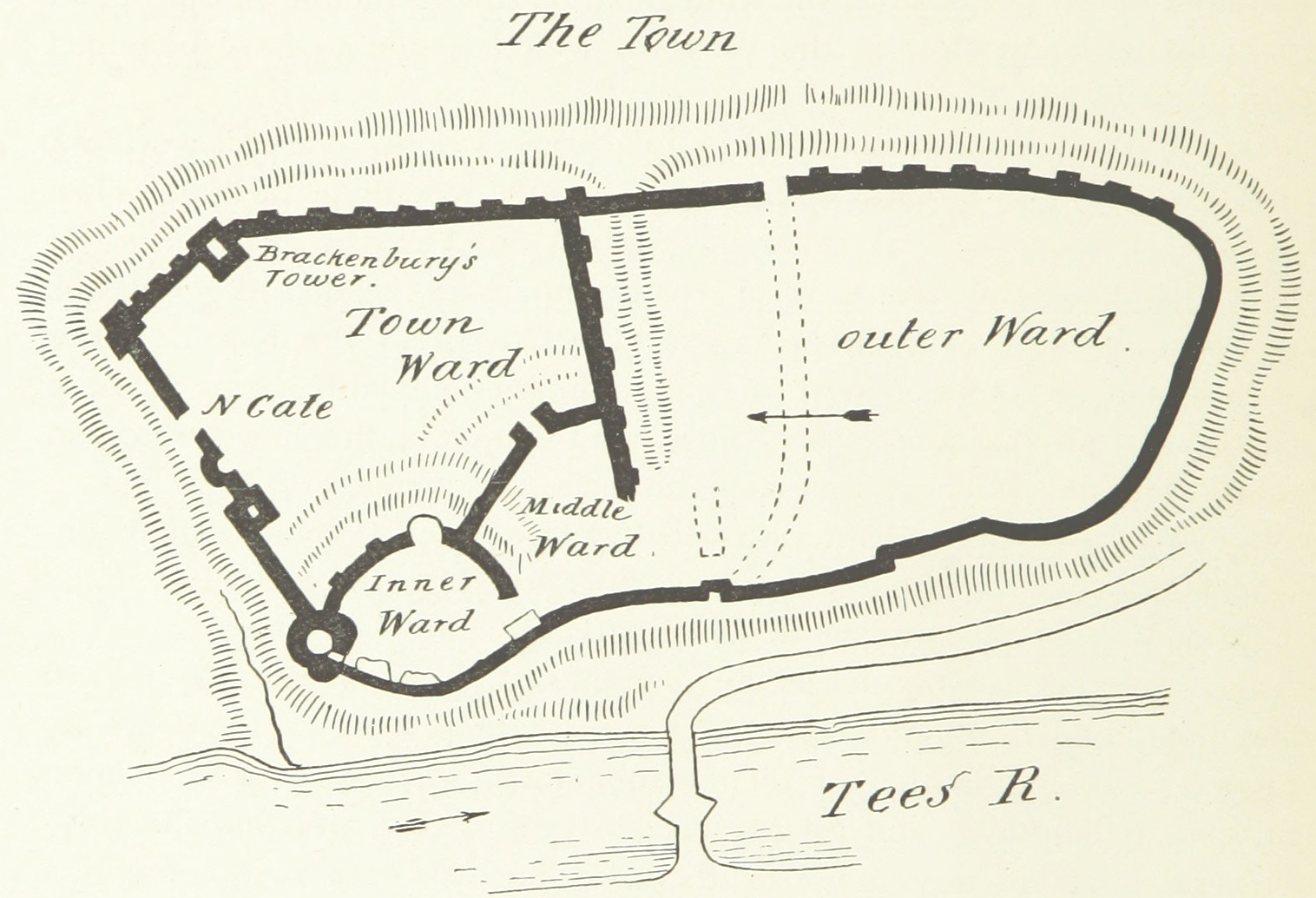
A plan of the castle from J. D. Mackenzie's The Castles of England: their story and structure

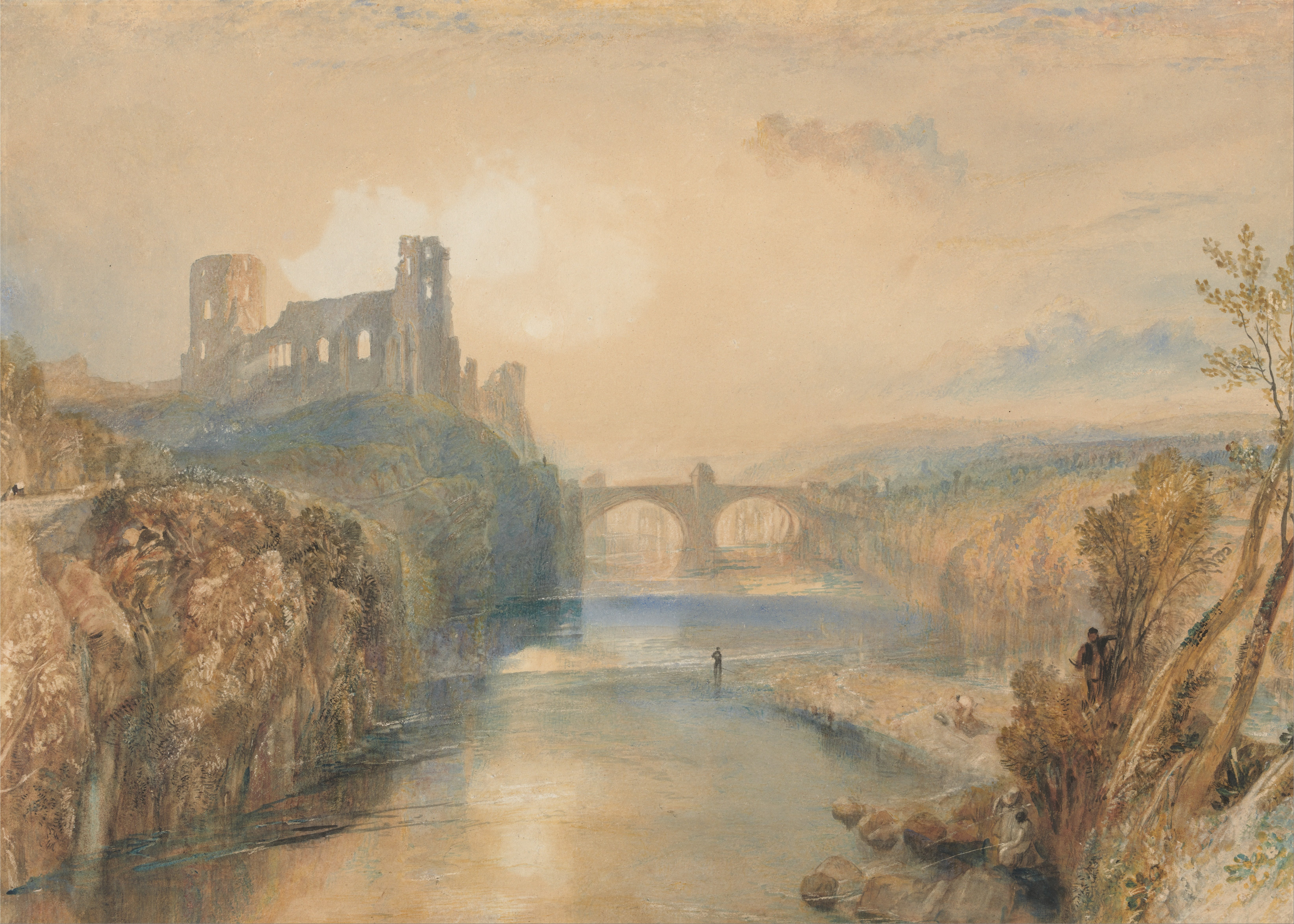
Painting of Barnard Castle, by J. M. W. Turner (c. 1825)

Barnard Castle is a ruined medieval castle situated in the town of the same name in County Durham, England.

== History ==
A stone castle was built on the site of an earlier defended position from around 1095 to 1125 by Guy de Balliol. Between 1125 and 1185 his nephew Bernard de Balliol and his son Bernard II extended the building.

In 1216 the castle was besieged by Alexander II, King of Scotland. It was still held by the Balliol family although its ownership was disputed by the Bishops of Durham. When John Balliol was deposed as King of Scotland in 1296 the castle was passed to the Bishop of Durham. Around 1300 Edward I granted it to the Earl of Warwick. In the 15th century the castle passed by marriage from Anne Beauchamp, 16th Countess of Warwick to her husband, Richard Neville, 16th Earl of Warwick. In 1477 during the Wars of the Roses, Richard, Duke of Gloucester (later Richard III) took possession of the castle by right of his wife, Anne Neville. It became one of his favourite residences.

During the rebellion of the Earls of Northumberland and Westmorland, in the reign of Elizabeth, the castle, which was then the property of the crown, was garrisoned by Sir George Bowes, of Streatlam. During the Civil War, the castle was besieged by Cromwell, to whom, after a severe cannonading, the garrison surrendered. After frequent grants and reversions, the castle, lands, and appurtenances, were purchased by Sir Henry Vane, an ancestor of the Duke of Cleveland, himself a Viscount Bernard.

Sir Henry Vane the Elder, Member of Parliament and important member of Charles I household, at first his Governor, later his Treasurer, purchased Raby Castle, Barnard Castle and Estate for £18,000. He chose to make Raby his principal home and de-roofed and removed stone from Barnard Castle to repair and maintain Raby.

The castle is in the custody of English Heritage and is open to the public. Of particular interest are the ruins of the 12th-century cylindrical tower and the 14th-century Great hall and Great chamber. It is a Scheduled Ancient Monument, and was designated as a Grade I listed building in 1950. The remains of the medieval chapel of St Margaret in the outer ward are listed as Grade II.

== "Barney Castle" ==
"Barney Castle" is a phrase in the dialect of County Durham meaning "a pathetic excuse", generally thought to derive from the incident when Bowes retreated into the castle. Eric Partridge included the phrase in A Dictionary of Slang and Unconventional English (1937).
