= Walter de Berkeley of Redcastle =

12th-century Scottish noble

Sir Walter de Berkeley, Lord of Redcastle and Urr was a Scottish noble, who was Great Chamberlain of Scotland from 1165 to 1189.

His parentage is currently unknown and he is known to have had one son John, who died without issue, shortly after his father. He is known to have had two daughters, Agnes, who married Ingram de Balliol and Agatha, who married Humphrey de Adeville.

Walter died around 1193.
