= Ingram de Umfraville =

Scottish nobleman

Sir Ingram de Umfraville
- Coat of arms of Sir Ingram de Umfraville; Gules an orle ermine a label of five (or three) azure (also recorded without the label, after succeeding to his relative Ingram Baliol's titles)

Guardian of the Kingdom of Scotland (Second Interregnum)
- In office 1300–1301 Serving with: John Comyn; William de Lamberton
- Preceded by: Robert the Bruce
- Succeeded by: John de Soules

Personal details
- Spouse: Isabella
- Parent(s): Robert de Umfraville; Eva de Balliol

Sir Ingram de Umfraville (Note: Also Enguerrand de Umfraville or Inghram d'Umfraville) (fl. 1284–1320) was a Scottish noble who played a particularly chequered role in the Wars of Scottish Independence, changing sides between England and Scotland multiple times, throughout the conflict.

== Life ==
Ingram was the son of Robert de Umfraville of Collerton and Eva de Balliol.

In 1284 he joined with other Scottish noblemen who acknowledged Margaret of Norway as the heir of King Alexander III. Ingram adopted the arms of Baliol and inherited the estates of Ingram de Balliol on Baliol's death, being Foston in Leicestershire, Wharrington-upon-Tees in County Durham as well as the barony of Urr in Galloway and Red Castle in Angus. He was one of the ambassadors who established the 'Auld alliance' with France and Scotland in 1295. He was present at the siege of Berwick in 1296 with King Edward I of England and fought on the English side during the Battle of Falkirk in 1298.

Fighting on the side of Scotland he participated in the siege of Stirling Castle in 1299. He was appointed joint Guardian of Scotland on 10 May 1300 together with William Lamberton, Bishop of St Andrews, and John Comyn, Lord of Badenoch. He resigned the next year and was replaced by John de Soules. He participated in the siege of Lochmaben Castle in September 1301. In 1303 he again became an ambassadors to Paris, and, upon returning from France in 1304, Ingram had his lands forfeited to King Edward I, who gave them to Sir Henry de Percy. He received his lands back upon Robert the Bruce declaring himself King in 1306.

Ingram switched sides to the English and in 1307 became one of their commanders in the Carrick and Galloway area and held the Bruce and his small army in the hill country south of the Forth. King Edward II of England made Ingram Guardian of South and West Scotland. Edward Bruce defeated Ingram during the Battle of the River Dee in 1308. He fought on the side of the English at the Battle of Bannockburn in 1314. After the battle Ingram fled the field to Bothwell Castle, where he was captured and later ransomed. Ingram left Scotland in 1320 and obtained safe conducts from Edward II to travel to France.

== Family and issue ==
Ingram married Isabella, widow of Ailéan mac Ruaidhrí of Garmoran and had the following known issue:

- Eva de Umfraville, married Phillip de Mowbray, had issue.
- Isabella de Umfraville
