= Guy II de Balliol =

Guy II de Balliol (died early 1160s x 1167) was probably the second-eldest son of Bernard I de Balliol, Lord of Balliol and Barnard Castle. As his older brother Enguerrand predeceased their father, Guy succeeded when his father died sometime between 1154 and 1162. He died sometime on or before 1167, and was succeeded by his youngest brother Bernard II de Balliol.

== Notes ==
Preceded by Bernard I	Lord of Balliol	Succeeded by Bernard II
