= John I de Balliol =

English nobleman, namesake of Balliol College, Oxford

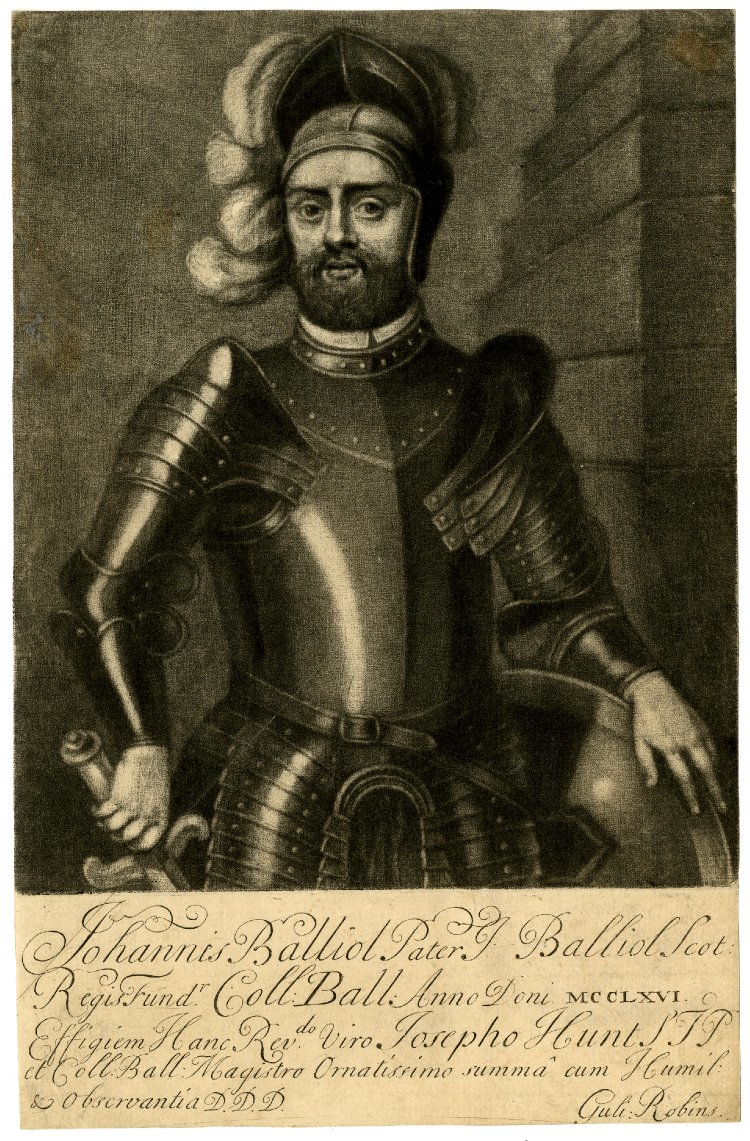
John de Balliol, mezzotint, c. 1731

John de Balliol (before 1208 – 25 October 1268) was an English nobleman, belonging to the House of Balliol. Balliol College, in Oxford, is named after him.

== Life ==
John de Balliol was born before 1208 to Cecily de Fontaines, daughter of Aléaume de Fontaines, chevalier, seigneur of Fontaines and Longpré-les-Corps-Saints and Hugh de Balliol, Lord of Balliol and of Barnard Castle and Gainford (c. 1177 – 2 February 1229). It is believed that he was educated at Durham School in the city of Durham.

In 1223, Lord John married Dervorguilla of Galloway, the daughter of Alan, Lord of Galloway and Margaret of Huntingdon. By the mid-thirteenth century, his wife had become very wealthy, principally as a result of inheritances from her family. This wealth allowed Balliol to play a prominent public role, and, on King Henry III's instruction, he served as joint protector of the young king of Scots, Alexander III. He was one of Henry III's leading counsellors between 1258 and 1265. and was appointed Sheriff of Nottinghamshire and Derbyshire from 1261 to 1262. He was captured at the Battle of Lewes in 1264, but escaped and rejoined King Henry. In 1265 Thomas de Musgrave owed him a debt of 123 marks. About 1266, Baldwin Wake owed him a debt of 100 marks and more.

Following a dispute with the Bishop of Durham, he agreed to provide funds for scholars studying at Oxford. Support for a house of students began in around 1263; further endowments, made after his death by Dervorguilla, resulted in the establishment of Balliol College.

== Issue ==
John and Dervorguilla had issue:

- Sir Hugh de Balliol, who died without issue before 10 April 1271. He married Agnes de Valence, daughter of William de Valence, 1st Earl of Pembroke.
- Alan de Balliol, who died before 10 April 1271 without issue
- Sir Alexander de Balliol, who died without issue before 13 November 1278. He married Eleanor de Genoure.
- King John I of Scotland, successful competitor for the Crown in 1292
- Ada de Balliol, who married, in 1266, William Lindsay of Lamberton, and had a daughter, Christian de Lindsay, who married Enguerrand V de Coucy. Christian and her husband are the ancestors of Mary of Guise, the mother of Mary, Queen of Scots.
- William de Balliol le Scot, who issued John le Scot, ancestor of Scotts of Scot's Hall and Brabourne. Some sources claim William was a distant cousin, not a son.
- Margaret de Balliol, who may have married Thomas de Moulton.
- Cecily de Balliol (d. before 1273), who married Sir John de Burgh (d. before 3 March 1280) of Wakerley, Northamptonshire, by whom she had three daughters: Devorguille de Burgh (c. 1256 – 1284), who in 1259 married Robert FitzWalter, 1st Baron FitzWalter; Hawise de Burgh (d. before 24 March 1299), who married Sir Robert de Grelle (or Grelley) (d. 15 February 1282) of Manchester; and Margery de Burgh, who became a nun.
- Mary (or Eleanor) de Balliol, who married John II Comyn, Lord of Badenoch, and had a son, John 'The Red' Comyn, Lord of Badenoch (d. 1306).
- Maud (or Matilda) de Balliol, married to Bryan FitzAlan, Lord FitzAlan, and feudal Baron of Bedale. They were parents to Agnes FitzAlan (b. 1298), who married Sir Gilbert Stapleton, Knt., of Bedale (1291–1324). Gilbert is better known for his participation in the assassination of Piers Gaveston, Earl of Cornwall.

== Notes ==
Preceded by Hugh	Lord of Balliol	Succeeded by John II
