= Hugh de Balliol =

English Lord

- Arms of the Balliol's of Bywell: Gules, an orle argent.

Personal details
- Died: 1229
- Spouse: Cecily de Fontaines
- Parent(s): Eustace de Balliol; Petronilla FitzPiers

Hugh de Balliol (died 1229), Lord of Bywell, Barnard Castle and Gainford, was an English nobleman. He was the son of Eustace de Balliol and Petronilla FitzPiers. Balliol was a supporter of King John of England during the Barons Wars of 1215–17.

== Life ==
Balliol was the eldest son and successor of Eustace de Balliol of Barnard Castle and Petronilla FitzPiers. Hugh probably succeeded to his father Eustace's lordships by 1209. Hugh and his brother Bernard were staunch supporters of King John; Hugh probably named his son John, after the king. Balliol defended the northern borders of England against King Alexander II of Scotland in 1216. His castle of Barnard Castle was besieged by Alexander II, however the siege was abandoned after the death of Alexander II's brother in-law Eustace de Vesci.

After Hugh's death in 1229, his son John succeeded to the chief Balliol estates.

== Marriage and issue ==
Balliol married Cecily, daughter of Aleaune de Fontaines and Laurette de St. Valerie, they had the following known issue:

- John de Balliol (died 1268), married Dervorguilla of Galloway, had issue. Their son become King John I of Scotland.
- Eustace de Balliol (died 1274), married firstly Helewise, daughter of Ranulph de Levington and Ada de Gernon. He married secondly Agnes, daughter of William de Percy and Joan Briwere.
- Jocelin de Balliol
- Hugh de Balliol (died 1292)
- Bernard de Balliol
- Ada de Balliol (died 1251), married John FitzRobert of Warkworth, had issue.

== Citations ==
| Preceded by Eustace | Lord of Balliol | Succeeded by John I |
