= Blacketts =

Former department store chain

Blacketts were a small department store chain based in the north east of England with its flagship store located in Sunderland.

== History ==
Blackett & Sons was opened in Sunderland in 1826 by William Blackett, a draper. The business grew from a drapery to a full line department store based on the corner of Union & High Street.

Stores were opened in Barnard Castle, Bishop Auckland and Stockton-on-Tees (1939), while they purchased the department store of D Hill, Carter & Company in Hartlepool during the Second World War. During early 1961, Blackett chairman Mr C. K. Rudkin-Jones pursued the purchase of Gorringes Department Store in London, losing out to a joint bid by the Gresham Trust and Charles Neale Investments. In 1963, the Blacketts group of stores was purchased by fellow department store group Hide & Co.

In 1970, the Hartlepool store was closed, becoming a discount superstore before being converted into The Hill Carter hotel. The Stockton on Tees store was sold to Waring and Gillow, a furniture company. The main store in Sunderland closed in 1972 due to the competition of department stores in the town.
