= Château de Bailleul (Picardy) =

Castle in France

- Bailleul, Picardy, France

Site information
- Owner: Balliol family

Location
- Coordinates: 50°01′48″N 1°51′02″E

Château de Bailleul was a castle in Bailleul, Picardy, France. It was the ancestral home of the English and Scottish Balliol family. The castle once owned by Enguerrand de Bailleul, Admiral of France, was destroyed by the Duke of Burgundy.

The castle of Bailleul, was forfeited to the French crown in 1330, however was held in fief by Edward Balliol until his death in 1364, whereupon the castle passed to Raoul de Coucy.
