= Ian Usher =

English author and public speaker (born 1963)

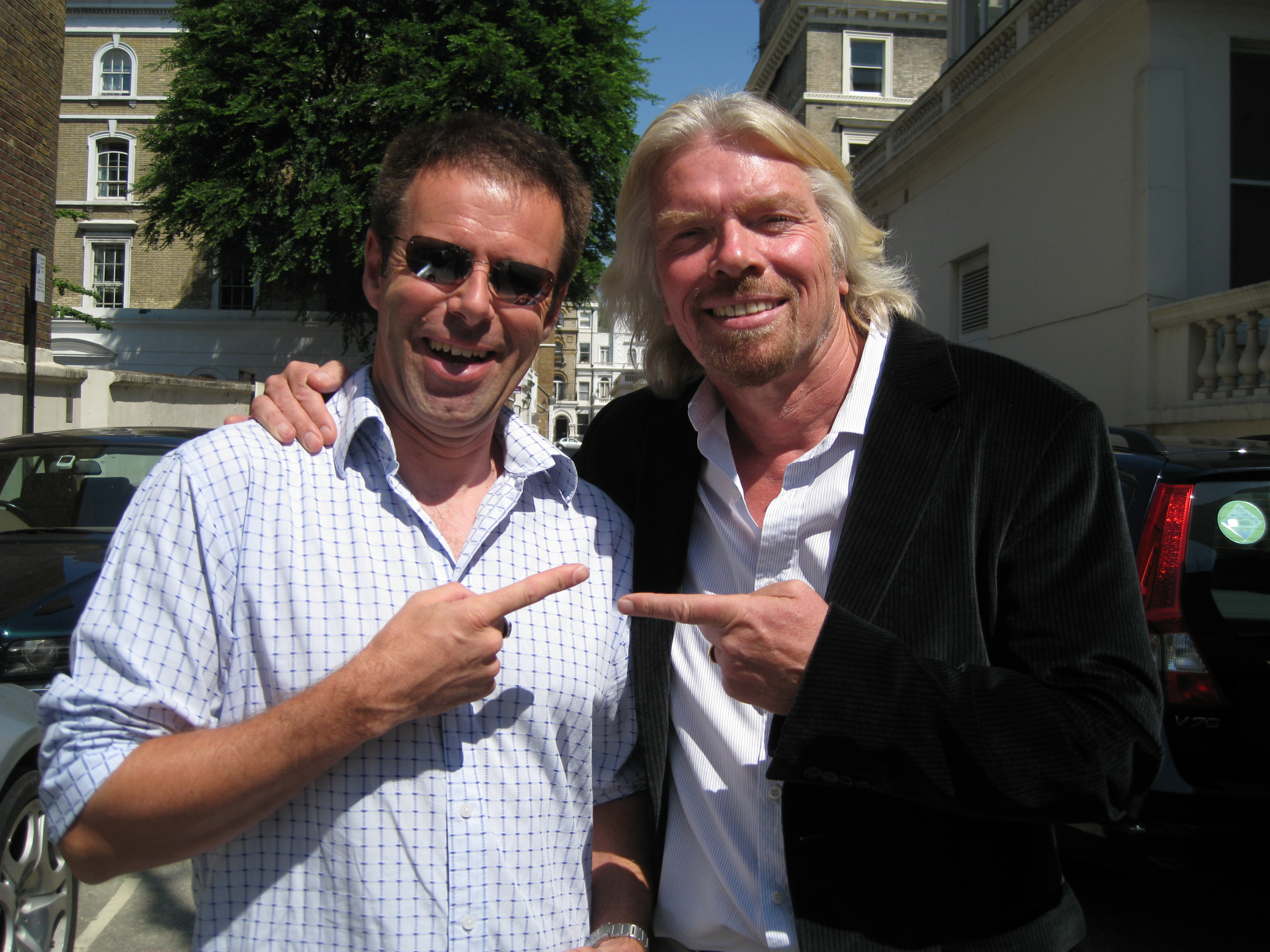
- Usher (left) meeting Richard Branson in 2009, fulfilling one of his goals
- Born: 25 July 1963 (age 63); Durham, England
- Known for: Selling his life on eBay, writing

Ian Usher (born 25 July 1963) is an English traveller, author and public speaker. He is best known for his 2008 "life for sale" listing on eBay following divorce from his wife, Laura.

== Early life ==
Usher grew up in Barnard Castle, Co Durham, England and attended the Barnard Castle School.

Following school, he lived on a kibbutz in Israel and travelled through Europe. He gained a BEd teaching degree in Outdoor Education at Liverpool Polytechnic in 1985.

== Career ==
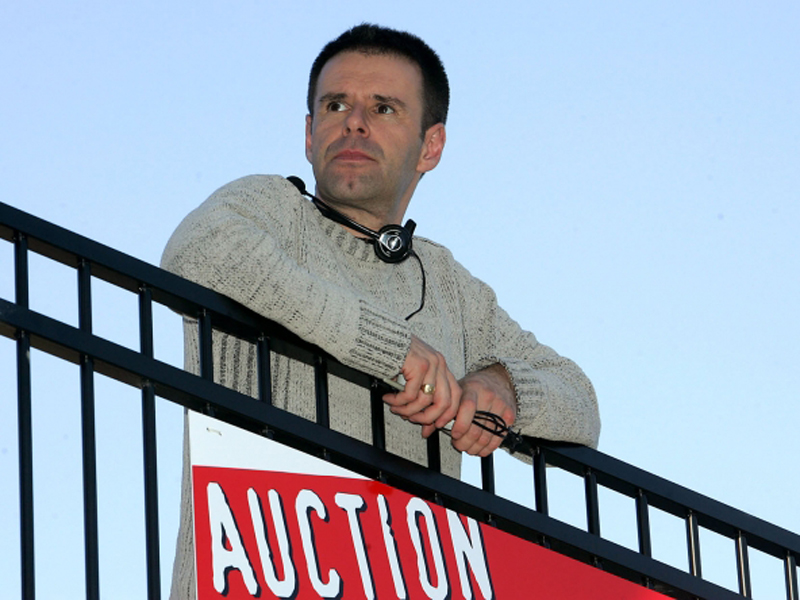
Ian Usher at his home in Perth, Western Australia, just before the sale of his "entire life" on eBay in June 2008

He worked with British Rail as a Youth Leadership and Teamwork Counselor before opening Scarborough Jet Skiing on England's north east coast with his partner, Bruce Jones.

In 2001 he moved to Australia where he worked in sales, marketing and management.

In 2008, after the break up of his marriage, Usher listed his "life for sale" on eBay. He gained world-wide notoriety. The final price was $399,300.00 (=€250 000).

His stated goal for the eBay auction was a "fresh start," so, following the sale, he travelled across the world in pursuit of a series of 100 goals, scheduled to be done in 100 weeks. His two-year "bucket list" ended in New York City in the crown of the Statue of Liberty on 4 July 2010.

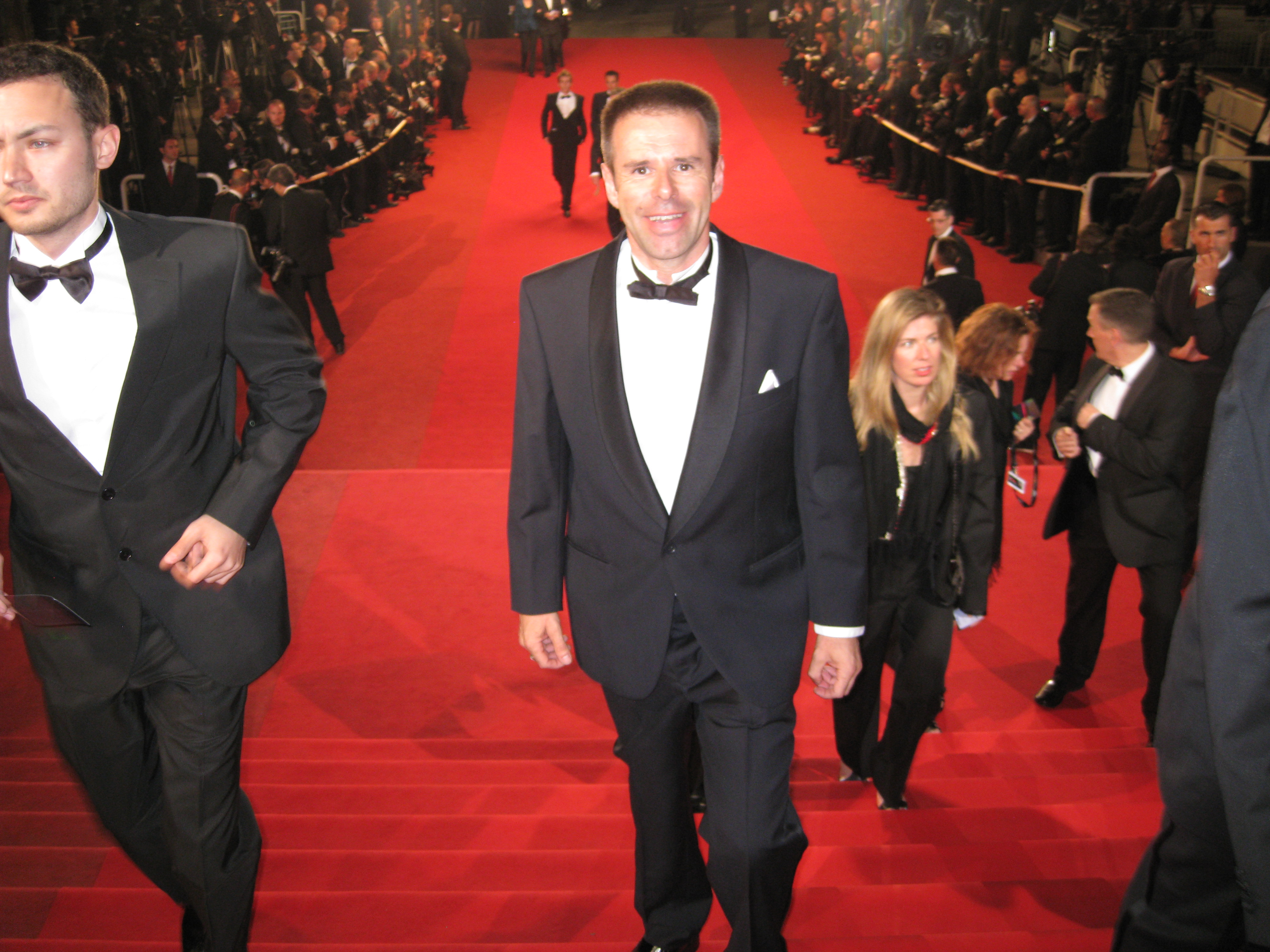
Usher on the red carpet at the Cannes Film Festival in May 2009, achieving the 43rd goal on his list of 100

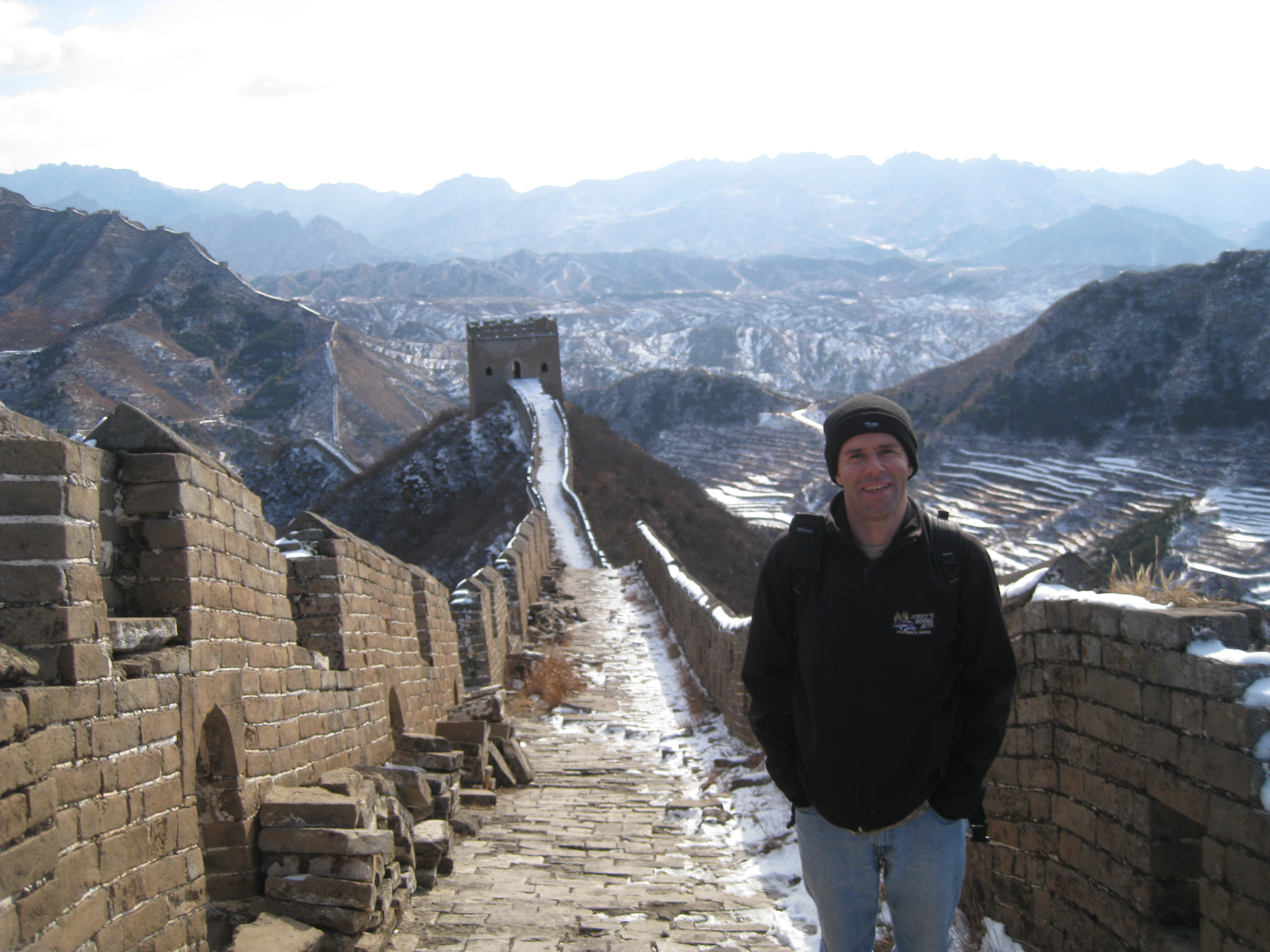
Usher visiting the Great Wall of China in November 2009, achieving the 64th goal on his list of 100

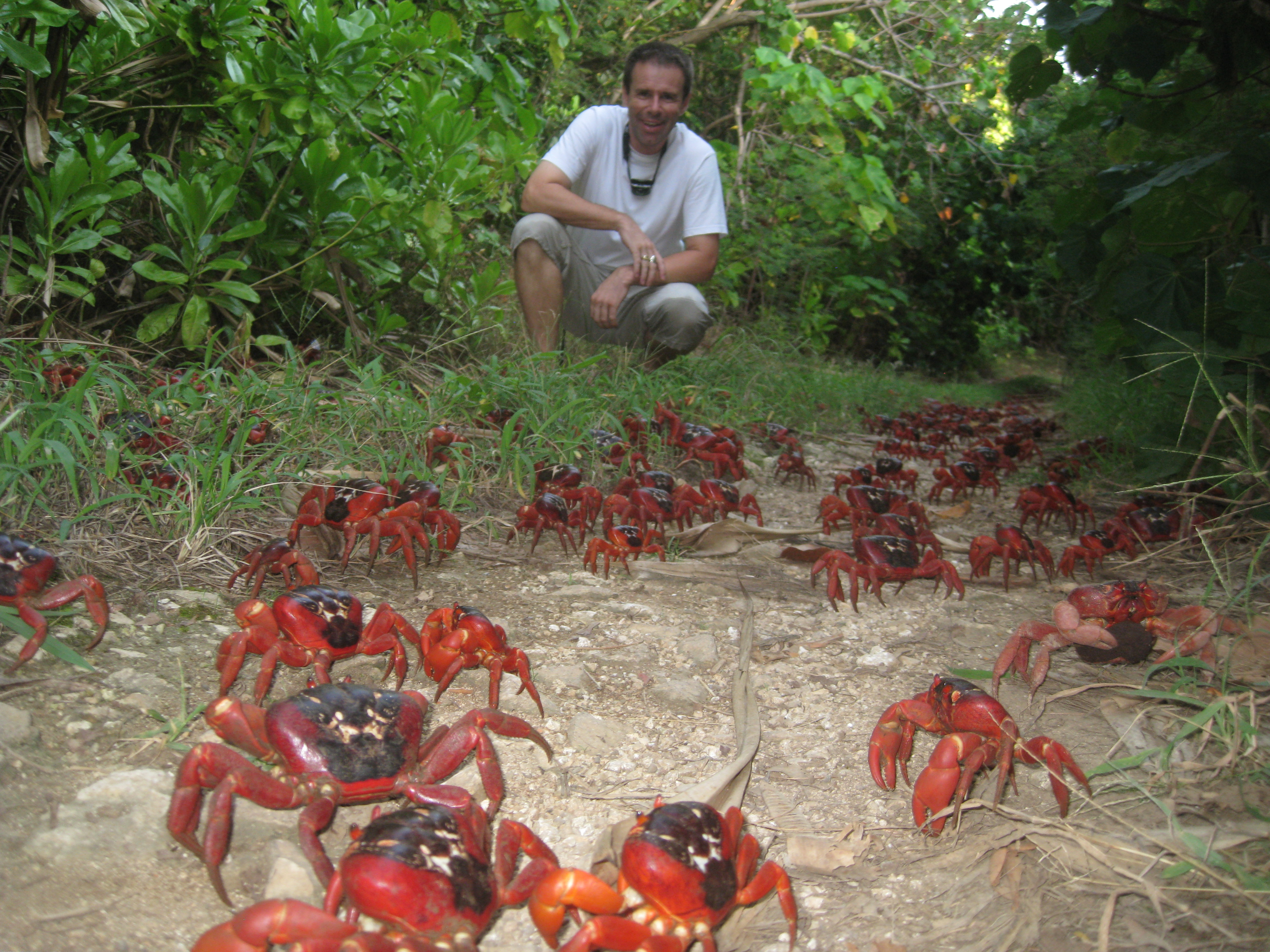
Usher visiting Christmas Island in December 2009 to see the march of the red crabs, achieving the 67th goal on his list of 100

== Books ==
He wrote two books, 2008's A Life Sold and 2013's Paradise Delayed. In A Life Sold, he documented two years of travel. The movie rights were purchased by Walt Disney Pictures, which commissioned a project called Life for Sale. It was scheduled to be produced by Andrew Panay.
