= Eustace de Balliol, Sheriff of Cumberland =

13th century English noble

Eustace de Balliol
- Baron of Kirklington
- Arms of Eustace de Balliol: Azure, crusilly an orle or.
- Died: 1274
- Noble family: Balliol family

Eustace de Balliol (died 1274), Baron of Kirklington, Sheriff of Cumberland and Governor of Carlisle Castle was an English knight.

He was a younger son of Hugh de Balliol and Cecily de Fontaines. Eustace served as the Sheriff of Cumberland and the Governor of Carlisle Castle from October 1261 until 1265. Eustace married Helewise, daughter of Ranulph de Lexington and Ada de Gernon. He took the cross in 1271 and went on crusade in the Holy Land, as part of Lord Edward's crusade. He returned and learned that his wife Helewise had died. Eustace married secondly Agnes, daughter of William de Percy and Joan Briwere. He died in 1274 and had no surviving issue.
