= Ingram de Percy =

English nobleman (died 1262)

Ingram de Percy (died 1262), Lord of Dalton and Levington, was an English nobleman.

He was a younger son of William de Percy of Topcliffe and Ellen de Balliol. While in the service of King Henry III of England abroad in France, he died in 1262. Ingram was allegedly poisoned while dining with Peter de Savoy. Among those who died from poisoning from the dinner were Baldwin de Redvers, Earl of Devon and Richard de Clare, Earl of Gloucester.

He is known to have married Joan, daughter and co-heiress of William de Vivonne and Maud de Ferrers. He was succeeded by his younger brothers William and Walter. His widow remarried Aimery X de Rochechouart.
