= Aimery X de Rochechouart =

13th century French noble

Aimery X de Rochechouart (died 1269), was a French noble.

He was the eldest son of Aimery IX de Rochechouart and Jeanne de Tonnay. He was known to be dead by 1269. His widow remarried Reginald FitzPiers, Lord of Blenlevenny.

== Marriage and issue ==
Aimery married Joan, widow of Ingram de Percy, she was the daughter and heir of William de Fortibus and Maud de Ferrers. They are known to have had the following known issue.

- Aimery XI de Rochechouart, married Germasie de Pons, without issue.
- Jeanne de Rochechouart, married Pons de Mortagne, had issue.
