= Motte of Urr =

Coordinates: 54.9627°N 3.8520°W

The Motte of Urr is the remains of a 12th-century motte-and-bailey castle located near the Haugh of Urr in Dumfries and Galloway, Scotland.

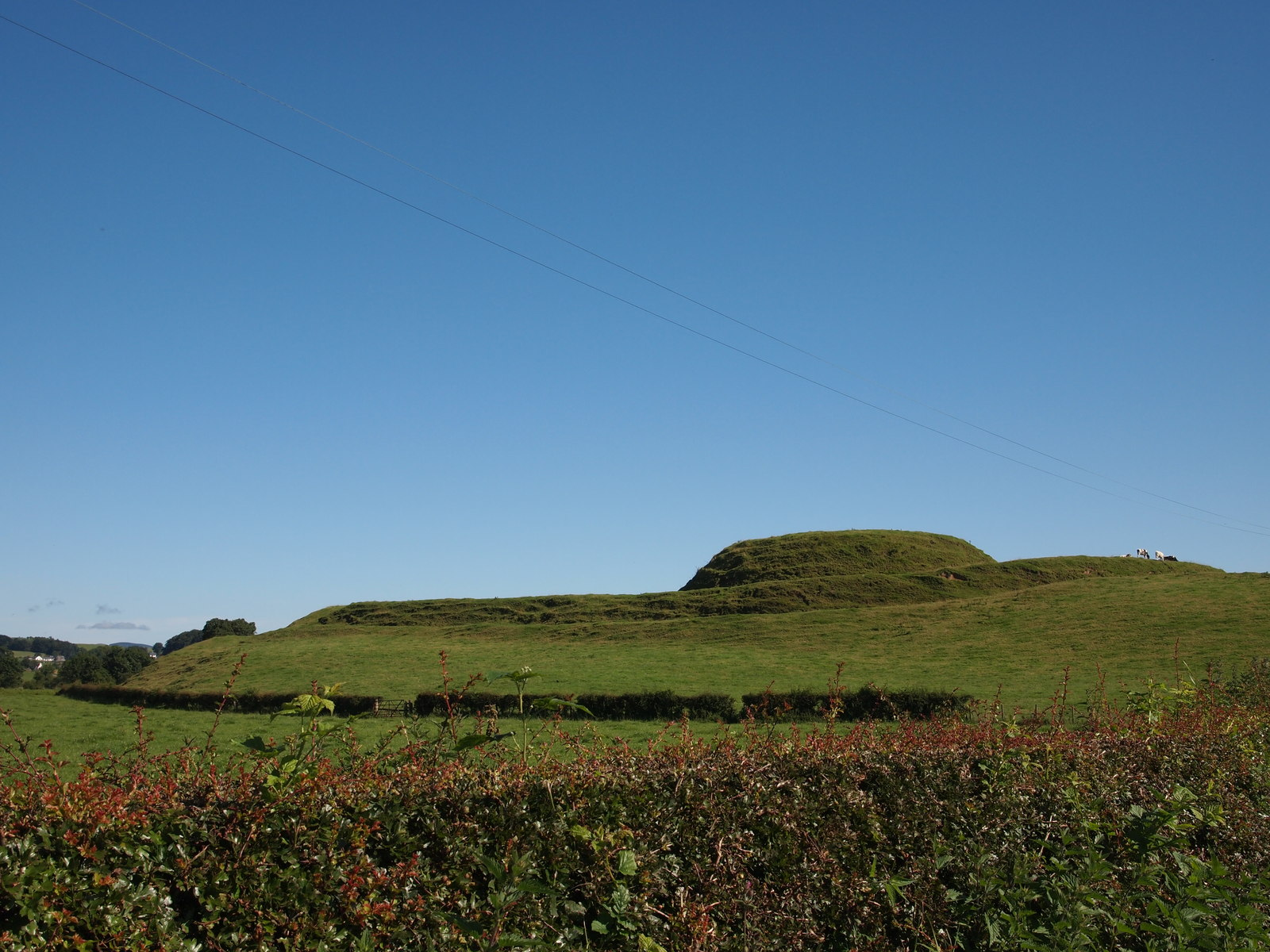
Motte of Urr, 2012

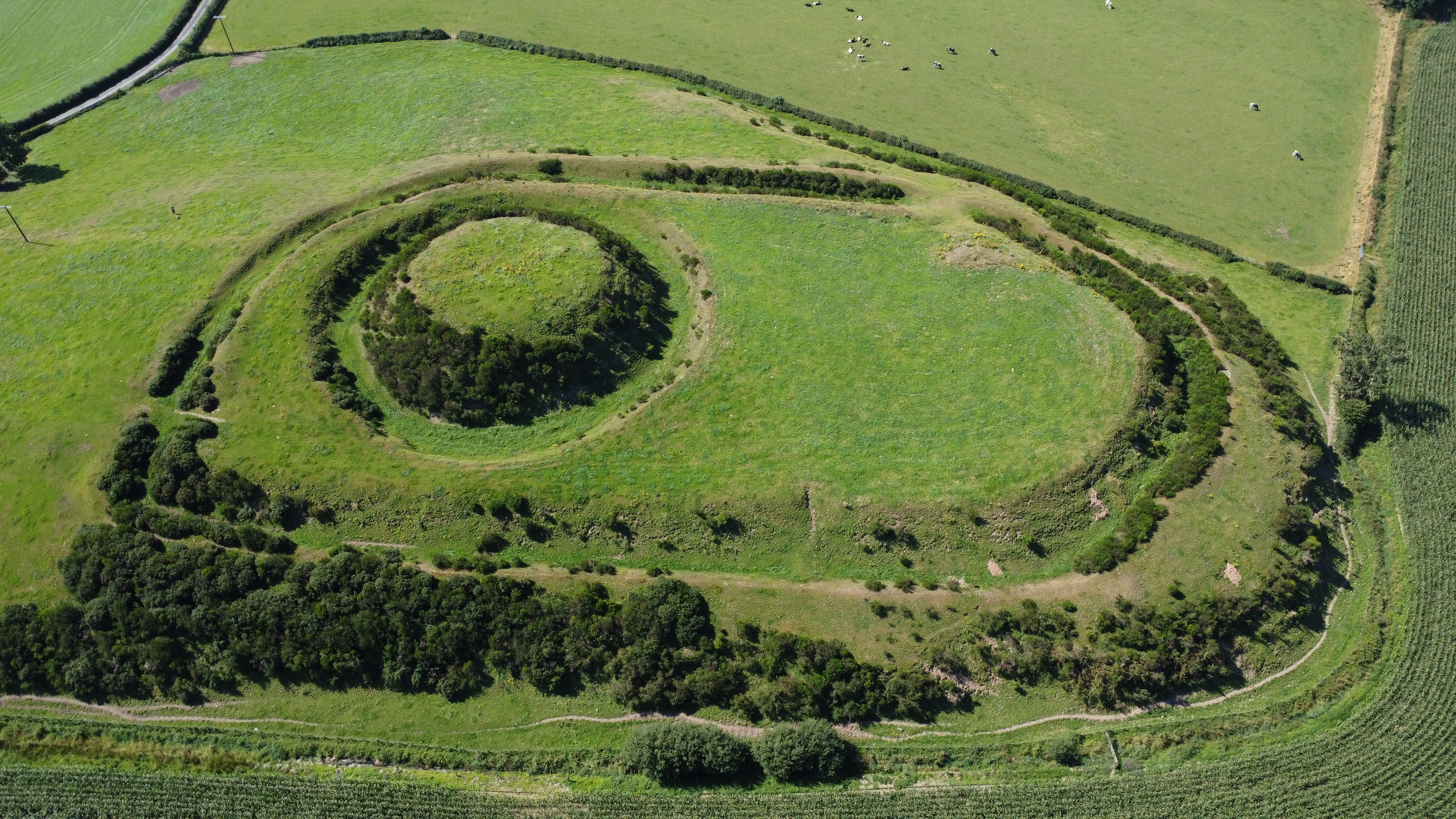
The Motte of Urr from above just east of the motte. 18 August 2025.

== History ==
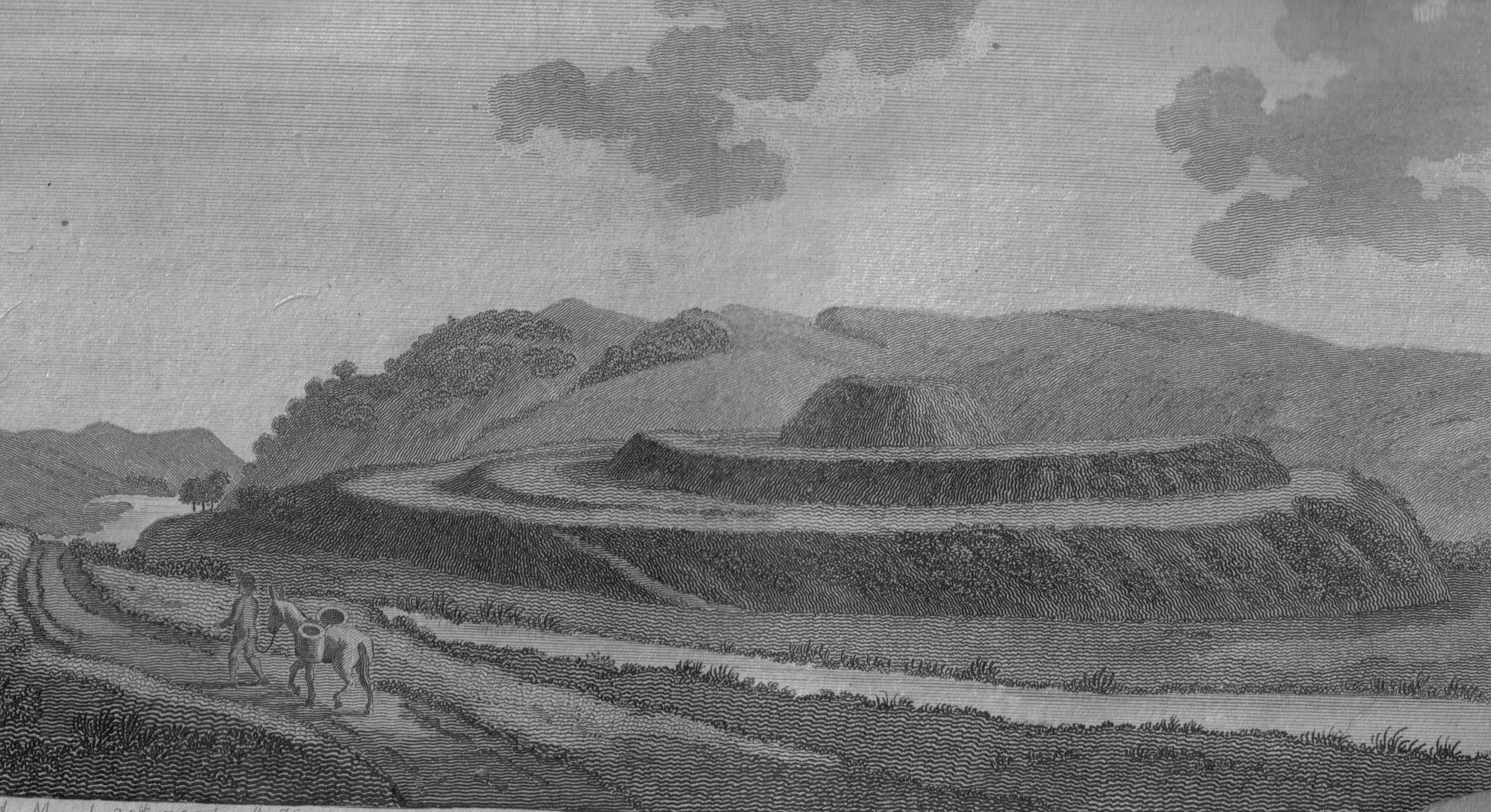
18th century sketch of Motte of Urr.

Walter de Berkeley received Urr in 1165 from William I of Scotland. It was probably Walter who built the motte surrounded by a timber palisade, as the caput of the barony of Urr. In the late 12th century the motte was heightened, possibly after being slighted during the 1174 uprising in Galloway.

The castle and barony passed to the Balliol family in the 13th century. It passed to Ingram de Umfraville, as heir to Ingram de Balliol. Umfraville had adopted the arms of Balliol, as the acknowledged heir. Henry Percy was granted the castle and barony on the forfeiture of Umfraville in 1296 by Edward I of England. The castle appears to have been abandoned after Robert and Edward Bruce's campaign of 1307–1308 in Galloway. The barony was subsequently split with half invested in the Scottish crown and the other granted to Thomas Randolph, 1st Earl of Moray.
