= Château de Tours-en-Vimeu =

Castle in Hauts-de-France, France

- Tours-en-Vimeu, Hauts-de-France, France

Location
- Coordinates: 50.0372°N 1.6803°E

Château de Tours-en-Vimeu was a castle near Tours-en-Vimeu, Hauts-de-France, France.

The lordship of Tours-en-Vimeu was inherited by Enguerrand de Umfraville, from his uncle Enguerrand de Balliol, who died in 1299 without issue. John de Moubray had inherited the lordship through his mother Eva de Umfraville, however was killed in 1332. Hugues Quiéret, is next recorded as Lord of Tours-en-Vimeu. He was beheaded after being captured by the English after the Battle of Sluys in 1340. A later Hugues Quiéret died at the Battle of Azincourt against the English in 1415. Alexandre de Maïoc, lord of Esmailleville, Cauroy and Tours resided at the castle of Tours in 1690.

A survey of the remains of the castle was undertaken in 1937 by J.P. Maitland.
