= Bernard II de Balliol =

Bernard II de Balliol (died c. 1190) was the fourth and youngest son of Bernard I de Balliol, lord of Balliol and Barnard Castle. Bernard appears to have succeeded his older brother Guy II de Balliol to the Balliol estates sometime between the early 1160s and 1167.

Bernard is most famous for his role in the capture of William the Lion, King of the Scots, near Alnwick in 1174. Bernard, described as a "man noble and high-spirited", was said by William of Newburgh to have originated and led the attack on the Scottish king that led to his capture.

Bernard de Balliol is last found in the historical records in the year 1189, at Dover conducting an agreement with the Bishop of Durham at the court of King Richard the Lionheart; he was succeeded in the following year by his cousin Eustace.

He married a woman named Agnes de Picquigny, whose exact origins are a matter of historical debate. Despite popular claims, Bernard had no recorded children, and his successor was his cousin Eustace de Helicourt, who (re)took the Balliol name and renamed himself Eustace de Balliol.

== Notes ==
Preceded by Guy II	Lord of Balliol	Succeeded by Eustace de Helicourt
