= William de Percy, 6th Baron Percy =

13th century English nobleman

William de Percy (died 1245), sixth feudal baron of Topcliffe, was an English noble.

His father Henry de Percy was a son of Joscelin of Louvain and Agnes de Percy, while his mother Isabel de Brus was the daughter of Adam II de Brus, 3rd Lord of Skelton and great-granddaughter of Robert de Brus, 1st Lord of Annandale, belonging to an English branch of the same family that yielded Clan Bruce of Scotland. He died in 1245 and was buried at Sawley Abbey.

== Marriages and issue ==
He married firstly married Joan, daughter of William de Briwere and Beatrice de Vaux. They are known to have had the following known issue.

- Anastasia de Percy, married Ralph FitzRandolph, had issue.
- Joan de Percy, married the lord of Farlington.
- Agnes de Percy, married Eustace de Balliol, had issue.
- Alice de Percy, married Ralph Bermingham, had issue.

William married secondly Ellen, daughter of Ingram de Balliol and Agnes de Berkeley, they are known to have had the following known issue.

- Henry de Percy, Master of Topcliffe (father of Henry Percy, 1st Baron Percy of Alnwick), married Eleanor de Warenne.
- Ingram de Percy, married Joan de Fortibus, without issue.
- William de Percy, Canon of St. Peter's, York
- Walter de Percy
- Galfrid de Percy
- Alan de Percy
- Josceline de Percy
- Ellen de Percy
