= Bernard I de Balliol =

Anglo-Norman noble

Bernard I de Balliol (died 1154 x 1162), the second-known-ruling Balliol of his line, was a twelfth-century Anglo-Picard baron based for much of his time in the north of England, as well as at Bailleul-en-Vimeu close to Abbeville in northern France. He was the nephew and next known successor of Guy I de Balliol, the first Balliol in England.

Bernard had succeeded to the lordships of his uncle by 1130 × 1133; during the Anarchy, perhaps in 1135, he appears to have sworn homage to David I, King of the Scots, who had taken over much of northern England in the name of his niece, Matilda, and in the name of his son, Henry, heir and claimant to the earldom of Northumbria. During David's campaign in 1138, and before the Battle of the Standard, Bernard and Robert I de Brus were sent to try to negotiate with David; after failing, Balliol allegedly renounced his homage to King David.

Although Balliol and his cause were successful in that battle, Bernard experienced defeat three years later fighting alongside King Stephen at the Battle of Lincoln (1141). In the years following Balliol continued to suffer as his lands were repeatedly attacked by the Scots, and the Scottish-backed William Comyn, who was installed as Bishop of Durham between 1141 and 1144.

Bernard appears to have founded the new settlement and Castle of Barnard in County Durham, named after him; despite being named after him, however, the earliest Norman ring work there appears to predate 1130. Bernard had at least four younger brothers, Radulf (Ralph), Enguerrand (Ingram), Hugh and Joscelin, and by his wife Maud (Matilda) fathered four sons, Enguerrand (Ingram), Guy, Eustace and Bernard, and one daughter, Hawise; Enguerrand predeceased him, and he was succeeded by Guy.

== Notes ==
Preceded by Guy I (?)	Lord of Balliol	Succeeded by Guy II
