= Guy I de Balliol =

Norman baron

Guy I de Balliol was a Picard baron who was granted land in northern England in the late eleventh century. In the 1090s, he was established in the north of England by King William Rufus, as part of King William's carve-up of the forfeited earldom of Northumberland.

According to historian Frank Barlow, Balliol's dynasty was one of those that "originated in the reign" and were "planted ... in the frontier areas in order to protect and advance the kingdom". Geoffrey Stell said that Guy's northern territories were given "almost certainly in return for support rendered in William's campaigns on the eastern frontier of Normandy in 1091 and 1094".

Guy himself originated in a frontier area, coming from Bailleul-en-Vimeu close to Abbeville on the frontier of the county of Ponthieu with the duchy of Normandy. Guy's nephew Bernard I de Balliol succeeded to Guy's estates before 1130 × 1133, meaning that Guy had died by then.

== Notes ==
Preceded by ?	Lord of Balliol	Succeeded by Bernard I
