= House of Balliol =

Noble family

Balliol arms: Gules an orle argent

The House of Balliol (de Bailleul) was a noble family originating from the village of Bailleul in Picardy. They held estates in England, granted during the reign of King William Rufus. Through marriage, they had claims to the Throne of Scotland. One member of the family, John Balliol, was named King of Scotland after the disputed succession following extinction of the Dunkeld line. John was deposed, leading to the First War of Scottish Independence. His son, Edward Balliol, also briefly controlled the Scottish throne during the Second War of Scottish Independence. Edward had no issue, and the direct line went extinct with him.

== List of heads of the Balliol estates ==
- Guy I de Balliol (died before 1130 × 1133), established lordship in northern England in 1090s
- Bernard I de Balliol (died 1154 x 1162), nephew of Guy
- Guy II de Balliol (died early 1160s x 1167), son of Bernard
- Bernard II de Balliol (died c. 1190), brother of above
- Eustace de Balliol (died c. 1209), cousin of above
- Hugh de Balliol (died 1229), son of above
- John I de Balliol (died 1268), son of above, the founder of Balliol College
- John II de Balliol (died 1314), son of above, reigned as King of Scotland from 1292 to 1296, as a descendant of David I of Scotland of the House of Dunkeld.
- Edward de Balliol (died 1364), eldest son of John; from 1332 to 1356 he was a pretender to the Scottish throne with the support of England, in opposition to David II of Scotland.

The last two on the list both had English support for their claims but both were deposed. Edward died without issue, but the Balliol descent continued through his cousin Christine de Lindsay (granddaughter of John I), who married Enguerrand V, Lord of Coucy, to the lords of Coucy and ultimately the Bourbon kings of France and Spain.

== See also ==
- List of British monarchs
- Scottish monarchs family tree
- Château de Bailleul, the former family seat in France
- Scott (surname)

*Royal House* House of Balliol
Preceded by House of Dunkeld	Ruling House of the Kingdom of Scotland; 1292 – 1296; Pretender 1332–1356	Succeeded by House of Bruce
