= Bailleul, Somme =

Bailleul
- Commune
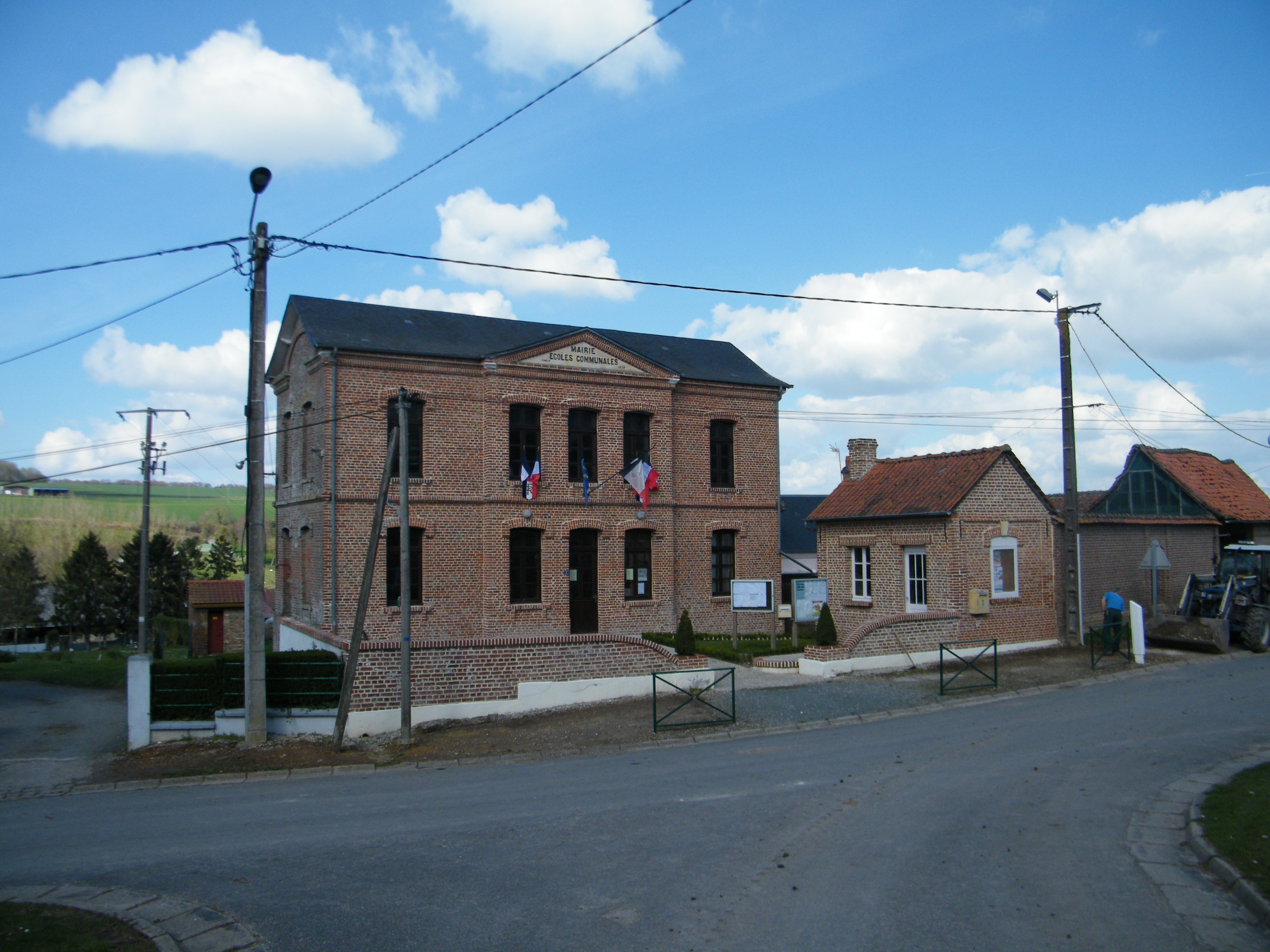
- The town hall and school of Bailleul

- Coat of arms
- Location of Bailleul
- Location within France Location within Hauts-de-France
- Coordinates: 50°01′48″N 1°51′02″E
- Country: France
- Region: Hauts-de-France
- Department: Somme
- Arrondissement: Abbeville
- Canton: Gamaches
- Intercommunality: CA Baie de Somme

Government
  - Mayor (2020–2026): Fabrice Frion
- Area^{1}: 8.62 km^{2} (3.33 sq mi)
- Elevation: 45 m (148 ft)
- Highest elevation: 112 m (367 ft)
- Lowest elevation: 7 m (23 ft)
- Population (2023): 253
  - Density: 29.4/km^{2} (76.0/sq mi)
- Time zone: UTC+01:00 (CET)
  - Summer (DST): UTC+02:00 (CEST)
- INSEE/Postal code: 80051 /80490
- ^{1} French Land Register data, which excludes lakes, ponds, glaciers > 1 km^{2} (0.386 sq mi or 247 acres) and river estuaries.

Bailleul (French pronunciation: [bajœl]) is a commune in the Somme department in Hauts-de-France in northern France.

== Geography ==
Situated in the west of the department, 5 miles to the south of Abbeville, on the D93 road.

== Population ==
Historical population
Year	Pop.	±% p.a.
1968	255	—
1975	226	−1.71%
1982	248	+1.34%
1990	223	−1.32%
1999	232	+0.44%
2007	259	+1.39%
2012	278	+1.43%
2017	266	−0.88%
2023	253	−0.83%
Source: INSEE

== Notable people ==
Guy I de Balliol, Anglo-Norman baron in England

== See also ==
- Communes of the Somme department
- House of Balliol
- Roussel de Bailleul
