= Barnard Castle =

Town and civil parish in County Durham, England

Coordinates: 54.55°N 1.92°W

- Town and civil parish
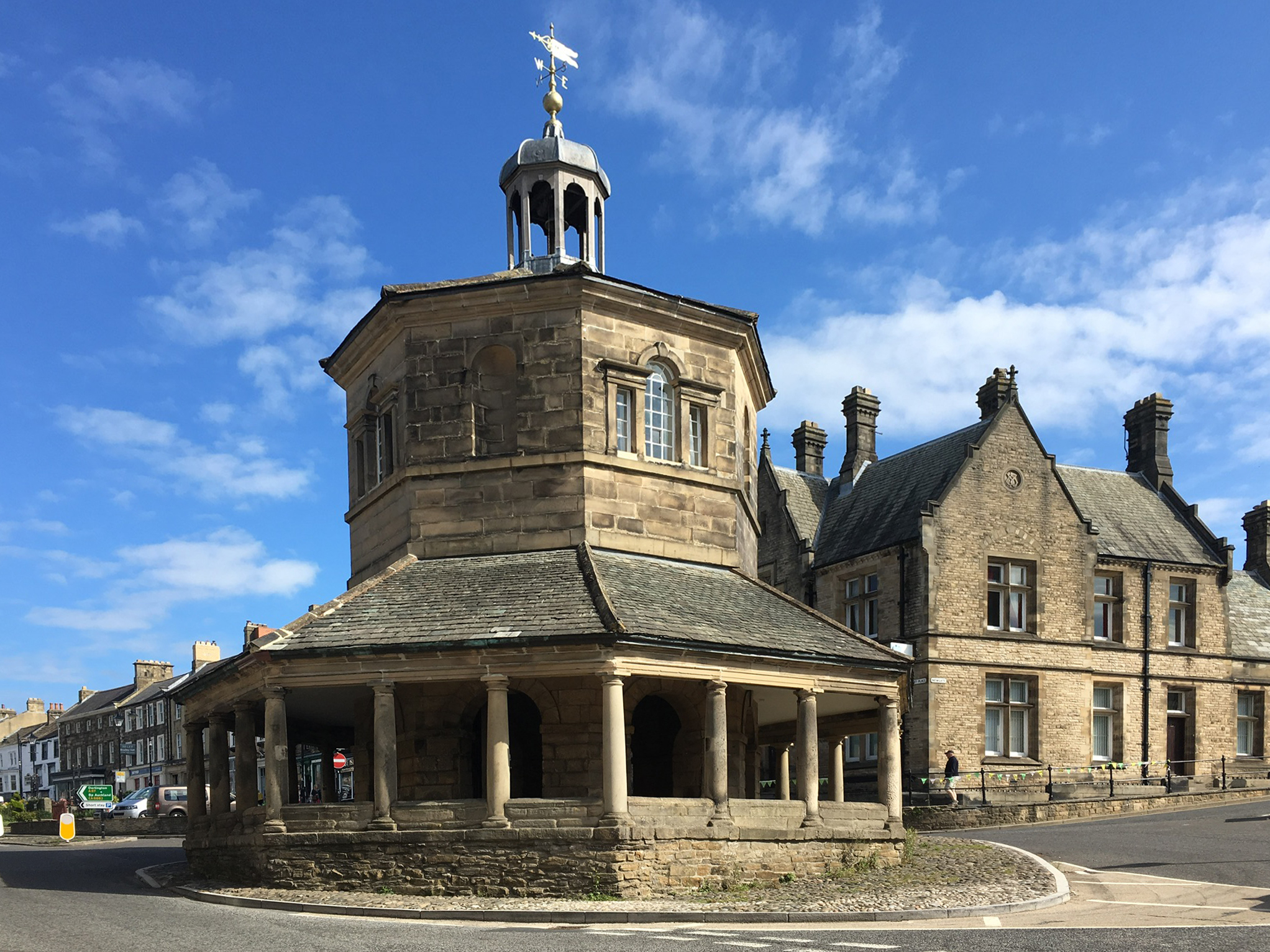
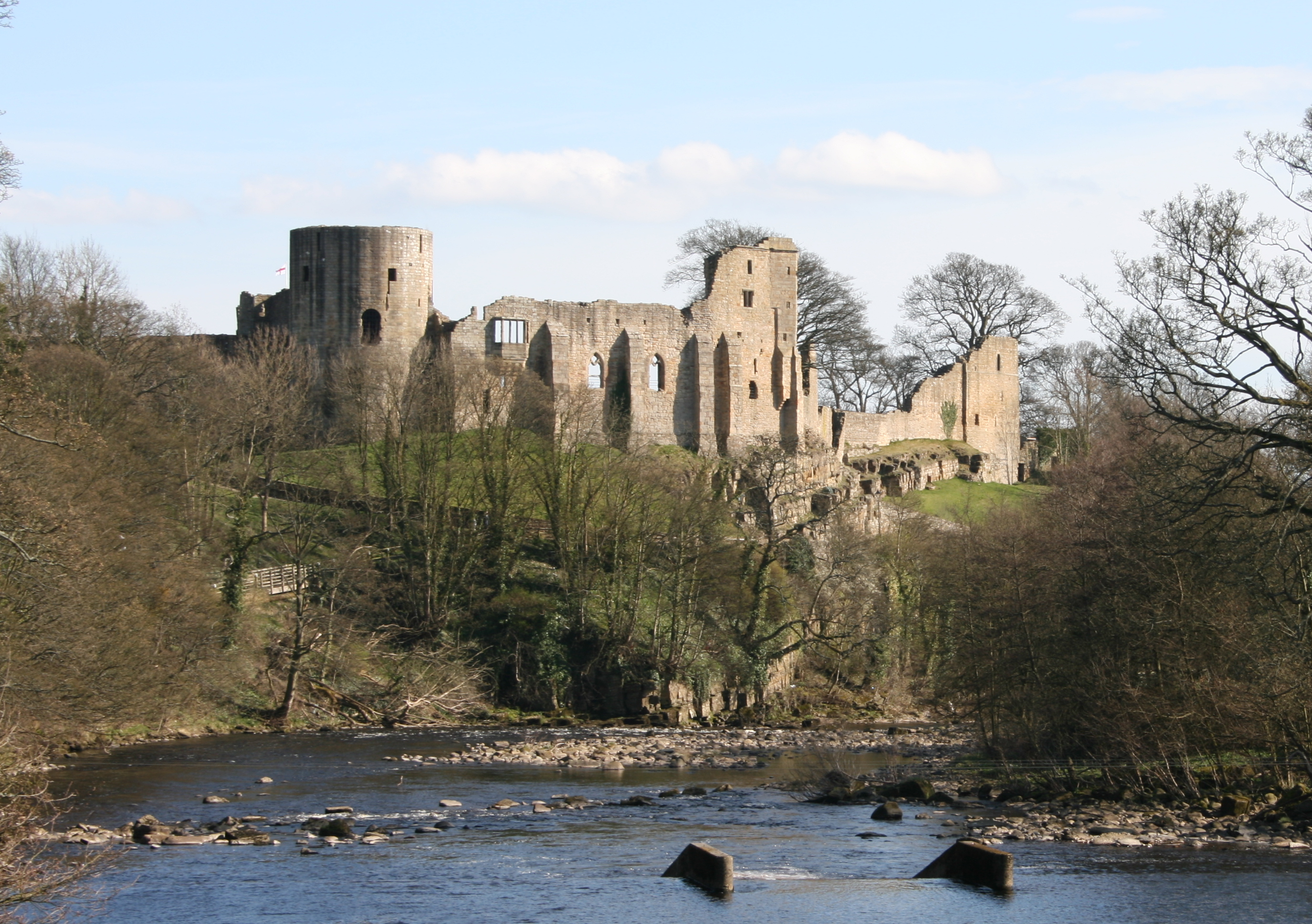
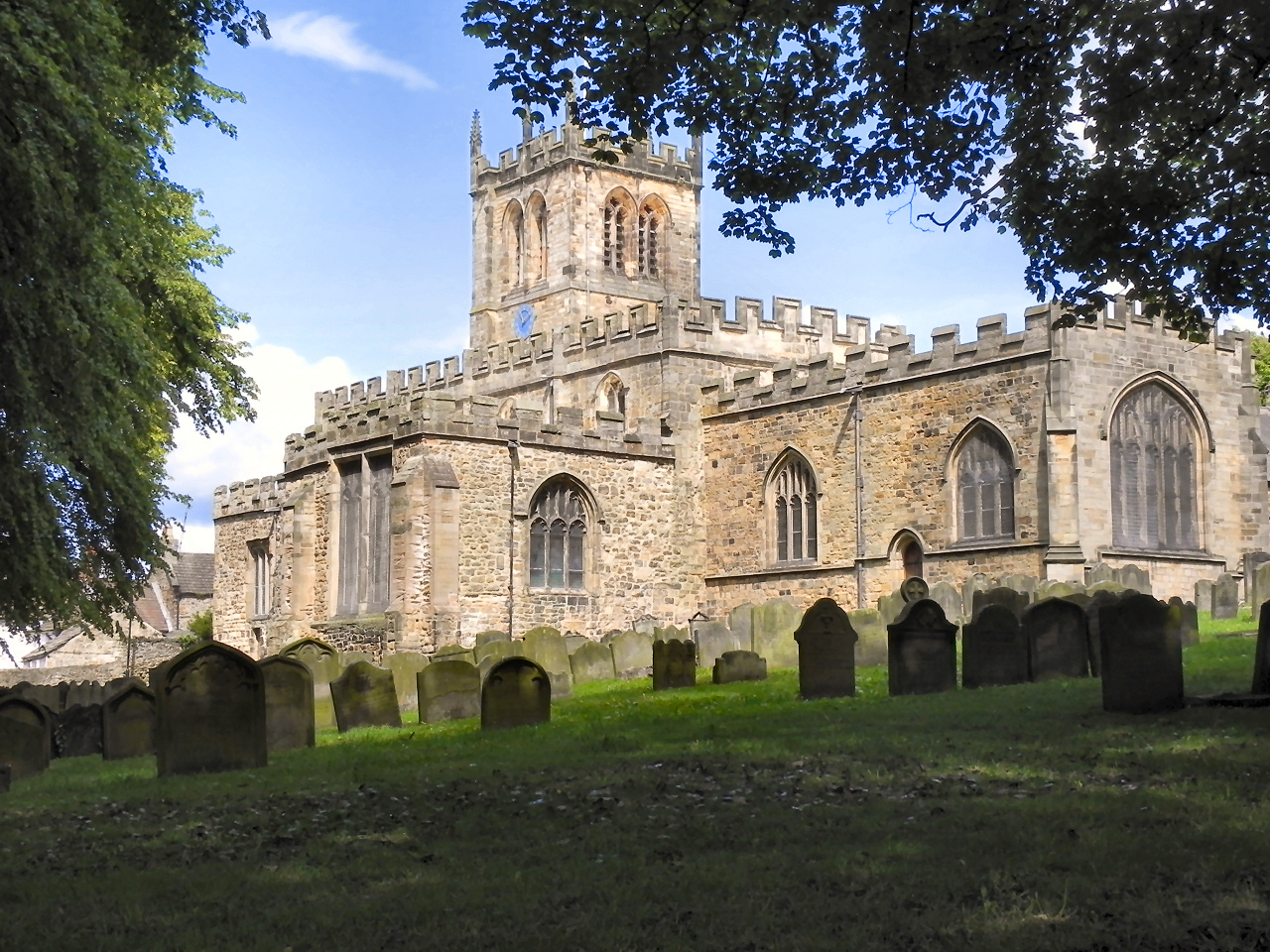
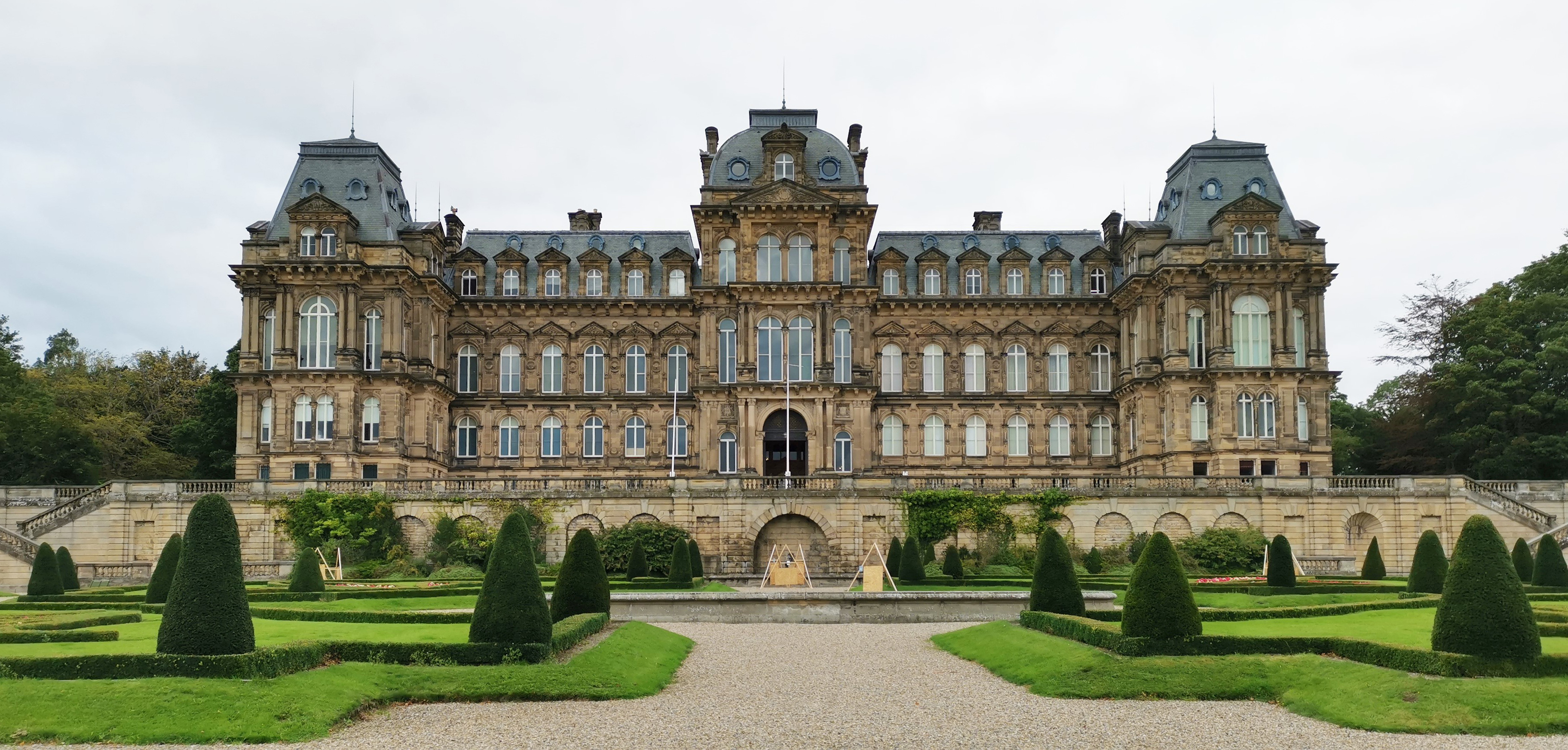
- Market Cross Castle St Mary’s Church Bowes Museum

- Location within County Durham
- Population: 5,495 (2011)
- OS grid reference: NZ047166
- Civil parish: Barnard Castle
- Unitary authority: County Durham
- Ceremonial county: County Durham
- Region: North East
- Country: England
- Sovereign state: United Kingdom
- Post town: BARNARD CASTLE
- Postcode district: DL12
- Dialling code: 01833
- Police: Durham
- Fire: County Durham and Darlington
- Ambulance: North East
- UK Parliament: Bishop Auckland
- Website: barnardcastletowncouncil.gov.uk

Barnard Castle (/ˈbɑːnəd/, BAR-nəd) is a market town on the north bank of the River Tees, in County Durham, England. The town is named after and built around a ruined medieval castle. The town's Bowes Museum has an 18th-century Silver Swan automaton exhibit and paintings by Goya and El Greco.

Barnard Castle is on the left bank of the River Tees, opposite Startforth, and is 21 miles (34 km) south-west of the county town of Durham. Nearby towns include Bishop Auckland to the north-east, Darlington to the east and Richmond to the south-east. The largest employer is GlaxoSmithKline, with a manufacturing facility on the outskirts of the town.

== History ==
Before the Norman Conquest, in 1066, the upper half of Teesdale was combined into an Anglo-Norse estate centred on the ancient village of Gainford, and mortgaged to the Earls of Northumberland.

In 1080 the first Norman Bishop of Durham, Bishop Walcher, was murdered. This led to the surrounding country being attacked and laid waste by the Norman overlords. Further rebellion, in 1095, caused the king, William II, to break up the Earldom of Northumberland into smaller baronies. The Lordship of Gainford was given to Guy de Balliol.

The earthwork fortifications of the castle were rebuilt in stone by his successor, Bernard I de Balliol, during the latter half of the 12th century, giving rise to the town's name. The castle passed down through the Balliol family (of which the Scottish king, John Balliol, was the most important member) and then into the possession of Richard Neville, Earl of Warwick. King Richard III inherited it through his wife, Anne Neville, but it fell into ruin in the century after his death.

The remains of the castle are Grade I listed, whilst the chapel, in the outer ward, is Grade II listed. Both sets of remains are now in the care of English Heritage and open to the public.

John Bowes lived at nearby Streatlam Castle (demolished in 1959). His Streatlam stud never had more than ten breeding mares at one time but produced no fewer than four Derby winners in twenty years. The last of these, West Australian, was the first racehorse to win the Triple Crown, in 1853.

Bowes and his wife, Joséphine Benoîte Coffin-Chevallier, founded the Bowes Museum, which is of national status. Housed in its own ornate building, the museum contains an El Greco, paintings by Goya, Canaletto, Boucher and Fragonard and a collection of decorative art. A great attraction is the 18th-century silver swan automaton, which preens itself, looks round and appears to catch and swallow a fish.

Although the town was never a major manufacturing centre, in the 18th century industry centred on hand-loom wool weaving, and in the early 19th century the principal industry was spinning and the manufacture of shoe thread.

== Notable visitors ==
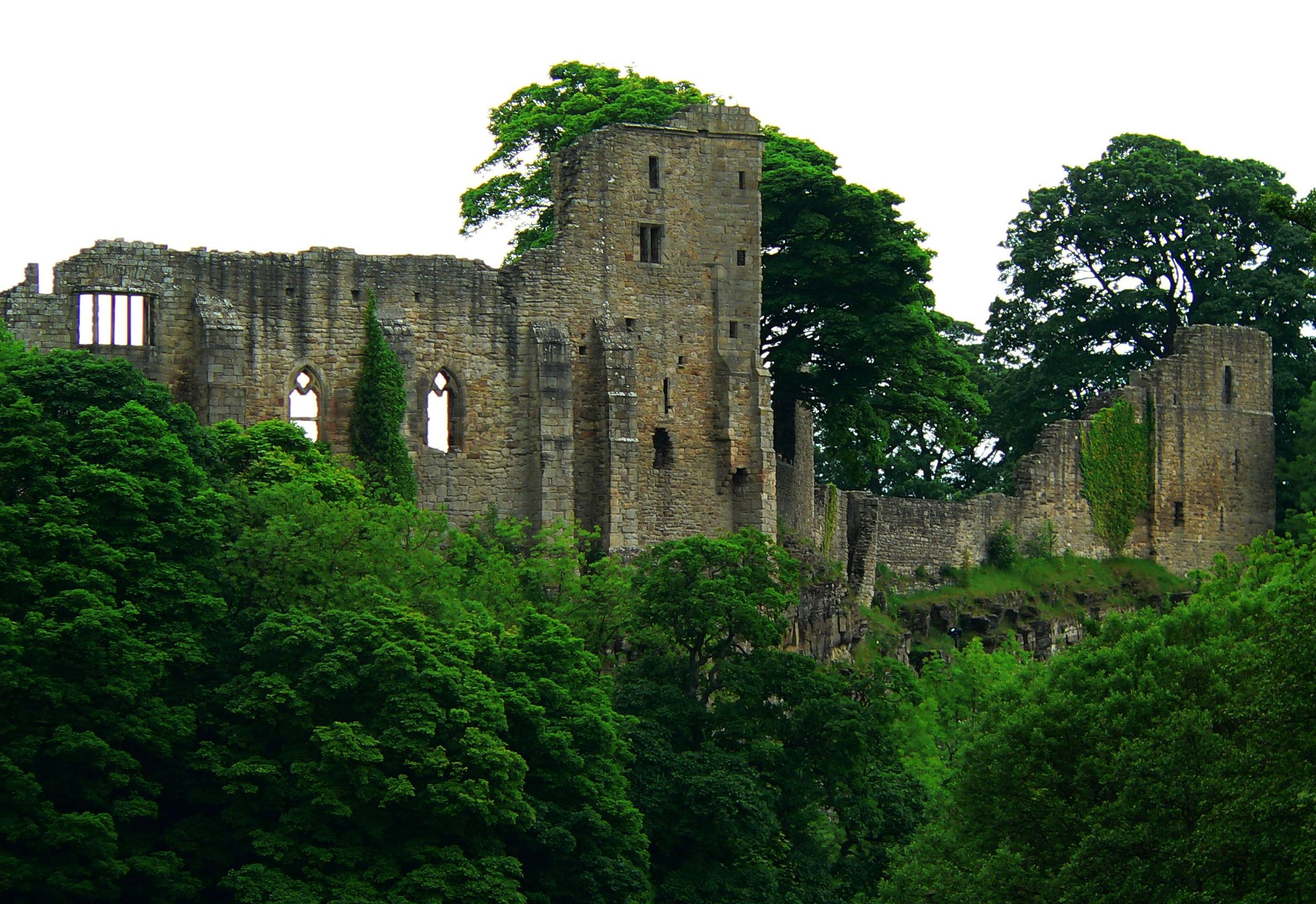
The ruins of Barnard Castle, which gave the town its name

Walter Scott frequently visited his friend John Sawrey Morritt at Rokeby Hall and was fond of exploring Teesdale. He begins his epic poem Rokeby (1813) with a man standing on guard on the round tower of the Barnard Castle fortress.

Charles Dickens (Boz) and his illustrator, Hablot Browne (Phiz), stayed at the King's Head in Barnard Castle while researching his novel Nicholas Nickleby in the winter of 1837–38. He is said to have entered William Humphrey's clock-maker's shop, then opposite the hotel, and enquired who had made a certain remarkable clock. William replied that his boy, Humphrey, had done it. This seems to have prompted Dickens to choose the title Master Humphrey's Clock for his new weekly, in which The Old Curiosity Shop and Barnaby Rudge appeared.

William Wordsworth, Daniel Defoe, Ralph Waldo Emerson, Hilaire Belloc, Bill Bryson and the artist J. M. W. Turner have also visited the town.

In May 2020 Barnard Castle came to national attention when Dominic Cummings, the chief adviser of the British Prime Minister, Boris Johnson, was discovered to have driven to the town with his family during the COVID-19 pandemic. He was at that time at significant risk of having the disease himself because of recent contact with the infected Prime Minister. (Cummings developed symptoms the next day.) Following media allegations that he had broken lockdown regulations by driving to the town, he maintained that he had driven there to test his eyesight, in order to reassure his wife that he was fit to drive them back to London the next day. Media commentators subsequently discovered that the phrase "Barnard Castle" had been slang for a pathetic excuse.

== Governance ==
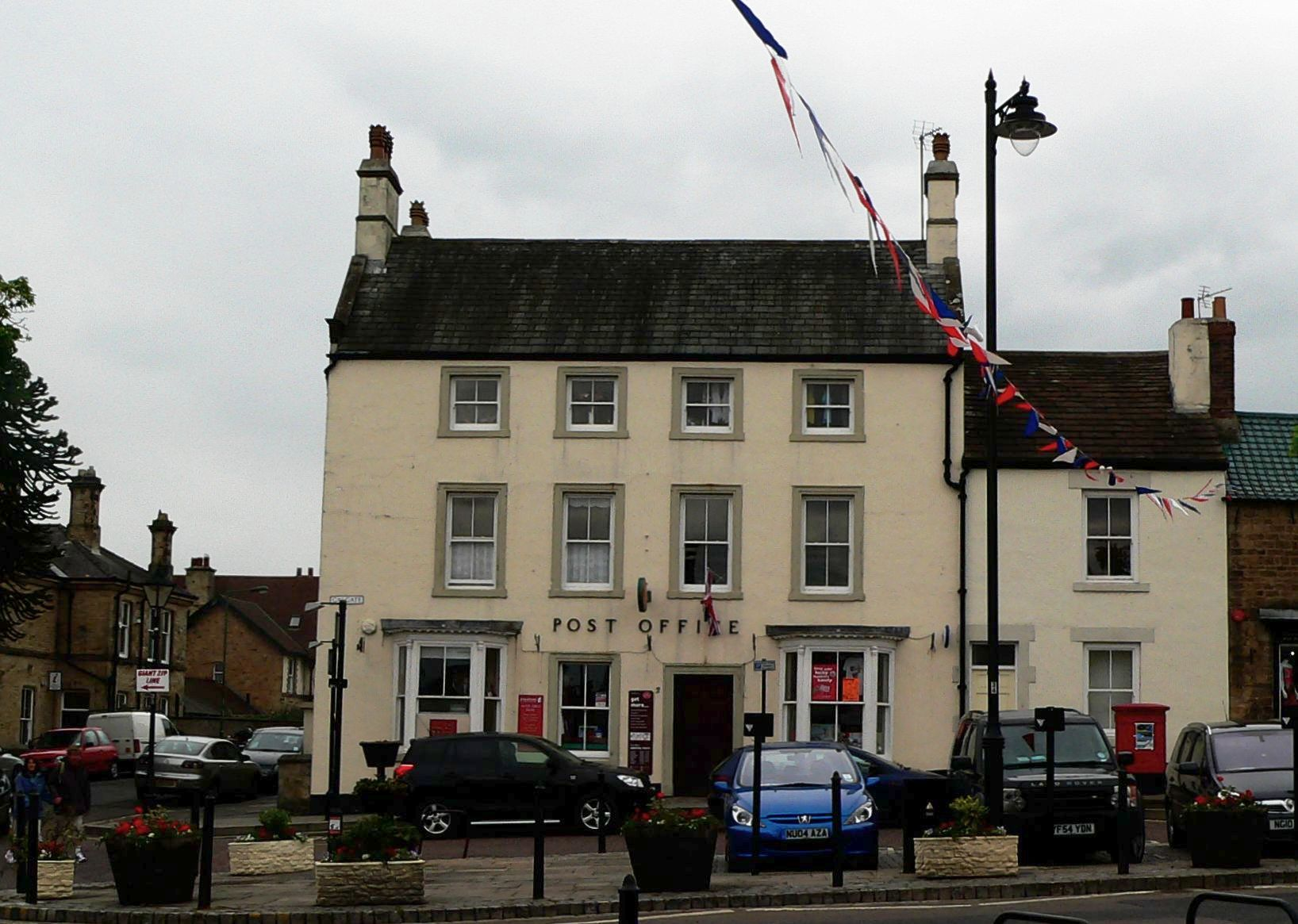
Barnard Castle Post Office

Barnard Castle is for all purposes (historic, ceremonial and unitary authority) located in County Durham. Barnard Castle has a Town Council governing a civil parish. The Town Council elects a ceremonial Town Mayor annually.

It is part of the Bishop Auckland parliamentary constituency, which since 2024 has been represented in parliament by Sam Rushworth of the Labour Party. Barnard Castle's County Councillor is Chris Foote-Wood of the Labour Party.

The local police force is Durham Constabulary. The town is the base for the Barnard Castle division, which covers 300 square miles (780 km^{2}). This division is within the force's south area.

=== Former ===
Between 1894 and 1974 the town was administratively part of Barnard Castle Urban District. The administrative and ceremonial county boundary was adjusted in 1974. Barnard Castle became the administrative centre of the Teesdale district of County Durham non-metropolitan county until its abolition on 1 April 2009, and the county council became the unitary authority of County Durham.

== Geography ==
- Elevation: 180 m (600 ft)
- Nearest large towns: Darlington, 16 miles (26 km), Bishop Auckland 14.8 miles (24 km)

== Economy ==
The most important employer in Barnard Castle is GSK, which has a large pharmaceutical manufacturing plant on the outskirts of the town which employs around 1,000 people. GSK has invested £80 million in the plant since 2007. Barnard Castle School follows GSK in second place, employing 183 people.

== Transport ==
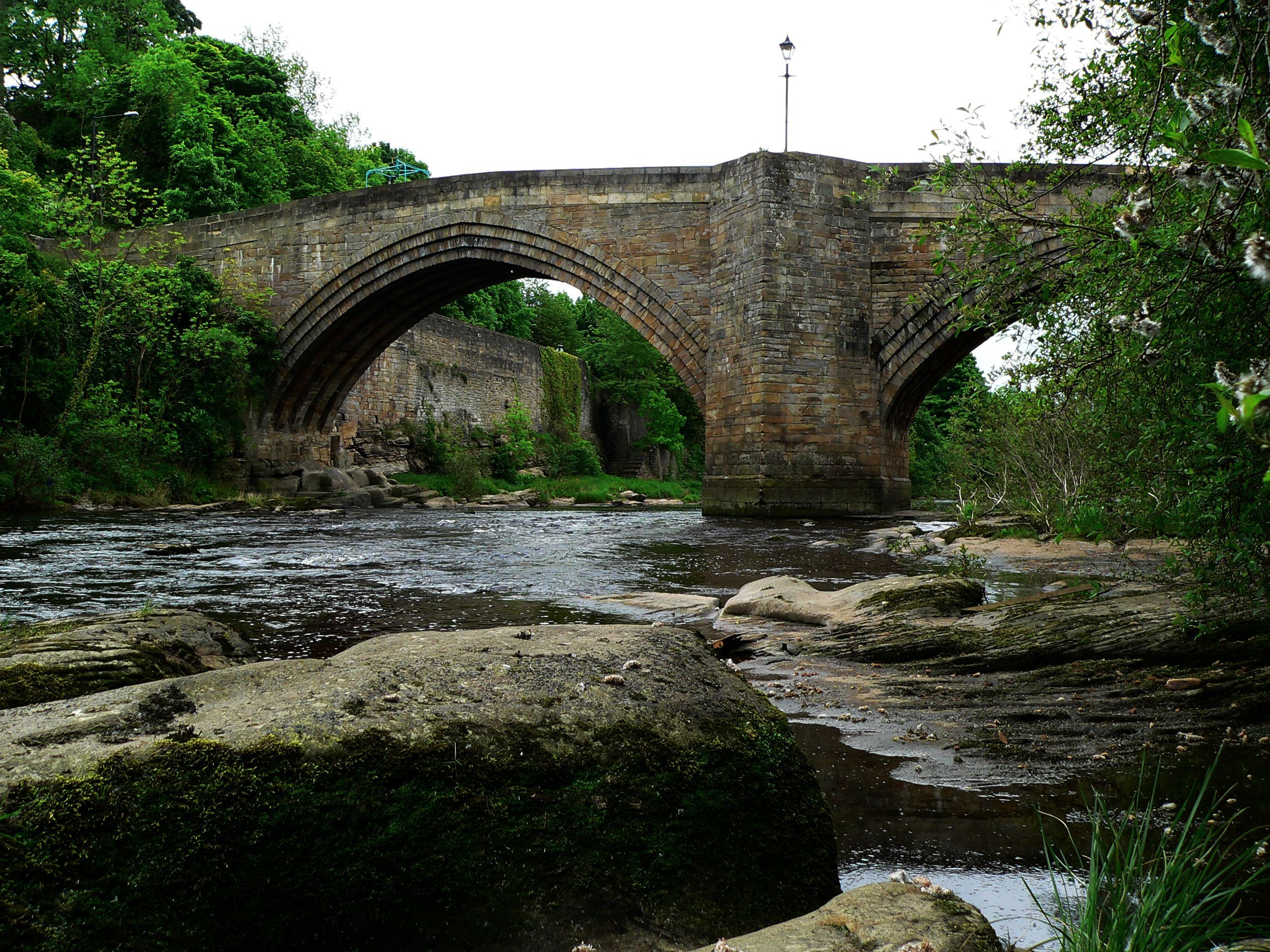
Barnard Castle Bridge over the River Tees

Barnard Castle has road connections to Bishop Auckland, Spennymoor and central County Durham via the A688 and to Darlington, Stockton-on-Tees and Middlesbrough by the A67. Barnard Castle is also four miles (6.4 km) from the A66, with access to the M6 to the west and the A1(M) to the east. The B6278 also connects Barnard Castle with Middleton-in-Teesdale. The old road bridge over the River Tees was built in 1569 and is Grade I listed.

Barnard Castle railway station was closed for passenger trains in 1964. A Bill was approved in 1854 for a line from a junction with the Stockton & Darlington Railway at Darlington to Barnard Castle, which opened on 9 July 1856, with intermediate stations at Broomielaw, Winston, Gainford and Piercebridge. The terminus at Darlington lasted only five years. In 1856 the South Durham & Lancashire Railway proposed a line from Bishop Auckland to Tebay via Barnard Castle and Kirkby Stephen but only the western section was built, with the Company receiving its Bill in 1857.

The line opened on 8 August 1861 from a second terminus at Barnard Castle to a junction with the Lancaster & Carlisle Railway at Tebay with intermediate stations at Lartington, Bowes, Barras, Kirkby Stephen, Ravenstondale & Gaisgill. The two stations at Barnard Castle were some distance apart; the earlier station became a through station and closed to passengers on 1 May 1862 but remained in use as a goods depot. The second station was closed for passenger trains under the Beeching cuts in 1964 and completely on 5 April 1965, and the site was eventually built on by GlaxoSmithKline. Today rail access is via Bishop Auckland or Darlington. Two bus routes provided by Arriva North East connect Barnard Castle to Darlington, the X75 (Via Staindrop) and the X76 (Via Winston), and the 79, provided by Hodgsons Coaches, travels from Barnard Castle to Richmond.

== Education ==
Barnard Castle School is an independent co-educational boarding school on the eastern edge of the town. Teesdale School is an 11–18 comprehensive school on the outskirts of the town, just off the A688.

There are three primary schools serving the town. Green Lane school is for 4–11-year-olds. St Mary's is a Roman Catholic school on Birch Road near the church of the same name. Montalbo Primary School and Nursery is for 3-11-year-olds.

== Culture ==
The Bowes Museum was purpose-built to house the collection of John and Josephine Bowes. The museum is built in the style of a French chateau, in extensive grounds, and is by far the largest building in the town. It contains paintings by El Greco, Francisco Goya, Canaletto, Jean-Honoré Fragonard and François Boucher, together with a sizable collection of decorative art, ceramics, textiles, tapestries, clocks and costumes, as well as older items from local history. It is famous for the Silver Swan automaton, which played every day at 2pm until it seized up during the 2020 COVID-19 Lockdown. It is currently undergoing repairs.

The Witham Arts Centre, on the Horse Market, presents a variety of events, including drama, cinema, music, spoken word and children's events, as well as being the town's visitor information centre.

The Barnard Castle Meet is an annual festival, held on the second bank-holiday weekend in May, the schools' summer half-term week. The Meet, as it is known locally, grew from the North East Cyclists' Meet, dating back to 1885. Since the early 1900s the town has staged a carnival and grand procession through the town centre on the bank holiday Monday. There are around twenty separate events, which the Meet Committee asserts “reach every corner of the community”. In recent years the committee has staged its own music event, showcasing local and national talent on the Sunday and Monday, with all technical and musical support provided by Teesdale Community Resources (TCR).

The TCR Hub is a community centre on the edge of the town, with a wide range of indoor and outdoor activities.

The Barnard Castle Band, founded in 1860, is a brass band, known outside the area as a result of the march Barnard Castle by Goff Richards.

== Notable people ==
- David Bellamy – botanist, television presenter and author, died in Barnard Castle
- George Brown – missionary and ethnographer
- Anne Fine – children's writer, twice winner of the Whitbread Prize
- David Harper - BBC TV Antiques presenter
- Arthur Henderson – Winner of Nobel Peace prize (1934), former MP for Barnard Castle and first Labour cabinet minister
- Glenn Hugill – television presenter and producer
- David Jennings – composer
- Ian Usher – traveller, adventurer, writer and speaker. Sold "entire life" on eBay in 2008.

=== Former residents ===
- Joshua Harold Burn, 1942, Emeritus Professor of Pharmacology at Oxford University
- Bob Chatt, footballer for Aston Villa
- Siobhan Fahey, singer/songwriter from Bananarama/Shakespears Sister lived here for a short time as a child.
- Hannah Hauxwell, English farmer who was the subject of several television documentaries
- William Hutchinson, 18th-century historian
- Roderick Murchison, President of both the Royal Geological and the Royal Geographical Societies
- Cyril Northcote Parkinson, writer and inventor
- Arthur Riddell, third Catholic Bishop of Northampton
- Henry Witham, geologist and philanthropist
