= John Balliol (disambiguation) =

John Balliol (also known as John of Scotland or John I of Scotland was King of Scots from 1292 to 1296.

John Balliol or John of Balliol or John de Balliol may also refer to:

- John I de Balliol (died c. 1269), father of the king
- John Balliol (play), play about the king
