= Alice de Lusignan, Countess of Surrey =

French born English Noblewoman

Alice de Lusignan
- Countess of Surrey
- Born: 1224; Lusignan, France
- Died: 9 February 1256 (aged 32); Warren, Sussex, England
- Noble family: Lusignan
- Spouse: John de Warenne, 6th Earl of Surrey (m. 1247)
- Issue: Eleanor de Warenne; Isabella de Warenne; William de Warenne
- Father: Hugh X de Lusignan, "le Brun", Seigneur de Lusignan, Count of La Marche
- Mother: Isabella of Angoulême

Alice de Lusignan, Countess of Surrey (1224 – 9 February 1256) was a half-sister of King Henry III of England and the wife of John de Warenne, 6th Earl of Surrey. Shortly after her arrival in England from France in 1247, her half-brother arranged her marriage to the Earl, which incurred some resentment from the English nobility.

== Lineage ==
Alice was the second-eldest daughter of Hugh X of Lusignan ("le Brun"), Seigneur de Lusignan and Count of La Marche, and Isabella of Angoulême, queen dowager of England. She was born in Lusignan, Poitou, France in 1224, and was a member of the House of Lusignan.

She had five full brothers and three full sisters, besides her royal half-siblings from her mother's first marriage.

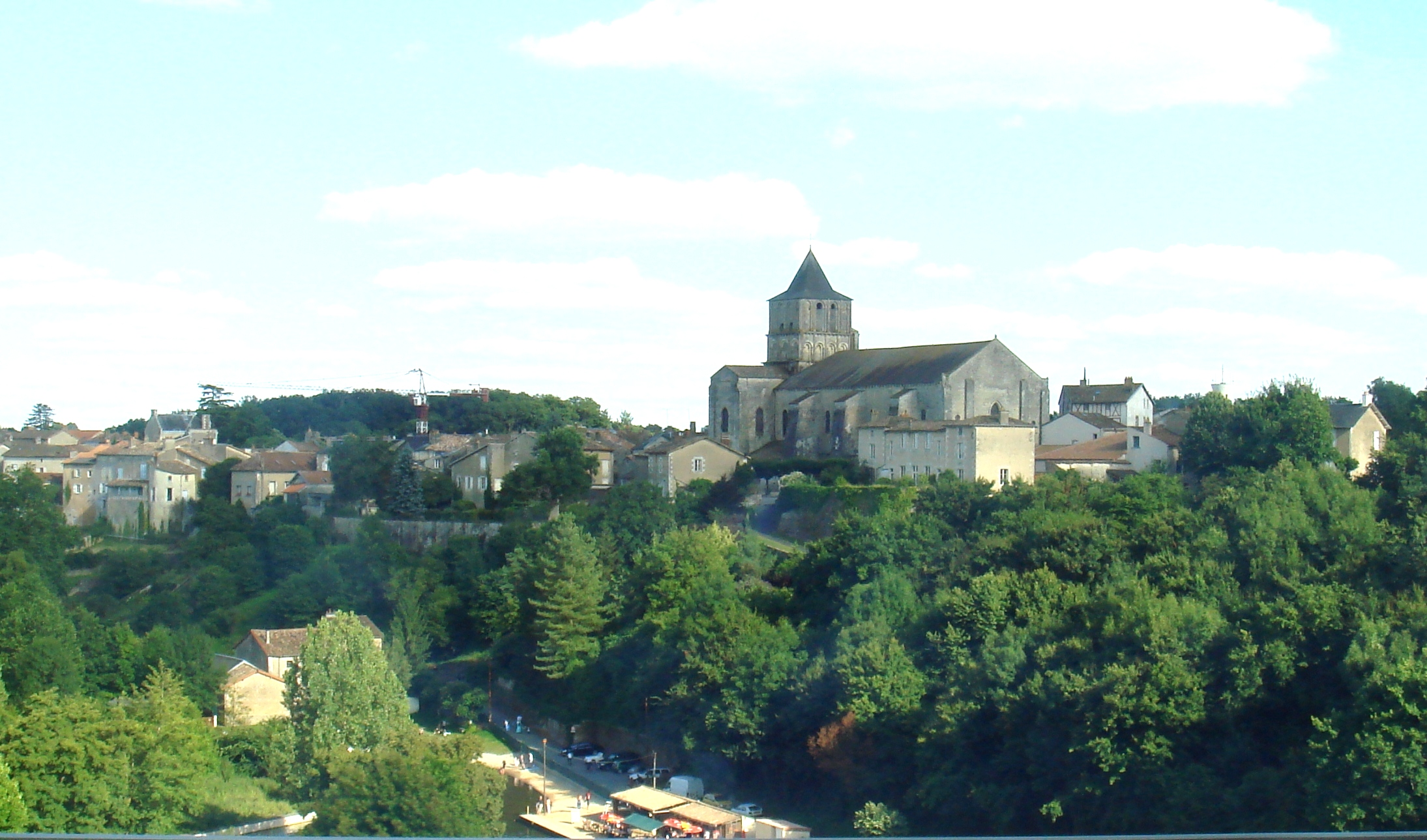
Lusignan, Vienne, France, the birthplace of Alice le Brun de Lusignan

== Marriage ==
In 1247, a year after her mother's death, Alice accompanied the new papal legate William of Modena, the Cardinal-bishop of Sabina, to England, which she had decided to make her home, and live at the expense of the Crown. In August of that year, her half-brother, King Henry married her to John de Warenne, 6th Earl of Surrey (August 1231 – 29 September 1304). The marriage caused some resentment amongst the English nobility, as they considered the king's Lusignan siblings to be parasites and a liability to the kingdom. Many prestigious honours and titles were granted to the Lusignans. Alice was also said to have been disdainful of all things English.

John was the son of William de Warenne, 5th Earl of Surrey and Maud Marshal. Together they had three children.

=== Issue ===
- Eleanor de Warenne (1251–1282), married Sir Henry de Percy, by whom she had issue, including Henry Percy, 1st Baron Percy of Alnwick.
- Isabella de Warenne (c.1253 – before 1292), married John Balliol, King of Scotland, and was the mother of Edward Balliol.
- William de Warenne (9 February 1256 – 15 December 1286). He was killed in a tournament. He married Joan de Vere, by whom he had two children, John de Warenne, 7th Earl of Surrey, and Alice de Warenne (15 June 1287 – 23 May 1338), who in turn married Edmund FitzAlan, 9th Earl of Arundel.

== Death ==
Alice died in Warren, Sussex, England, on 9 February 1256 after giving birth to her only son, William. She was about thirty-two years of age.

== Sources ==
- Carpenter, David (2020). Henry III: The Rise to Power and Personal Rule, 1207-1258. Yale University Press.
- Vincent, Nicholas (2003). "Isabella of Angouleme: John's Jezebel". In Church, S.D. (ed.). King John: New Interpretations. The Boydell Press.
