= Treaty of Newcastle (1334) =

14th treaty between England and Scotland

Territories ceded to England by Edward Balliol of Scotland

The Treaty of Newcastle was a treaty signed between King Edward III of England and his puppet King Edward Balliol of Scotland on 12 June 1334.

By the terms of the treaty, Balliol pledged the overlordship of England, the surrender of Berwick, and to cede the whole of south-eastern Scotland (Berwickshire, Roxburghshire, Selkirkshire, Peeblesshire, Dumfriesshire, East Lothian, Mid Lothian and West Lothian) to England.

The treaty became null and void when the legal Crown of Scotland was restored.
