= List of Scottish monarchs =

Monarchy of Scotland
- Royal coat of arms

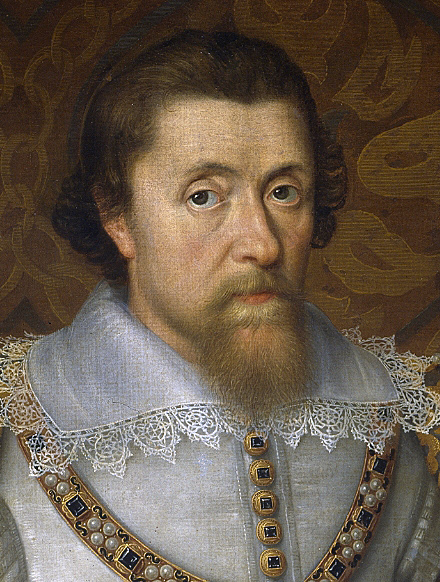
- Longest reigning James VI; 24 July 1567 – 27 March 1625

Details
- First monarch: Kenneth I
- Last monarch: Anne
- Formed: 843 (traditional)
- Abolished: 1 May 1707
- Residence: Royal Court of Scotland

The monarch of Scotland was the head of state of the Kingdom of Scotland. According to the Annals of Ulster, Kenneth I MacAlpin (Cináed mac Ailpín) — styled King of the Picts (Note: Historically, the Kingdom of Scotland is thought to have grown out of an earlier "Kingdom of the Picts" (and later the Kingdom of Strathclyde that was conquered in the 11th century, becoming part of the new Kingdom of Scotland). However, in reality, the distinction is a product of later medieval myth and confusion resulting from a change in nomenclature: Rex Pictorum ('King of the Picts') became Rí Alban ('King of Alba') under Donald II, when annals switched from Latin to vernacular around the end of the 9th century. By this time, the word Alba in Scottish Gaelic had come to refer to the Kingdom of the Picts rather than Britain (its older meaning).) — was the first king of a unified kingdom that encompassed the majority of what would later become the Kingdom of Alba. The Kingdom of the Picts went through a series of political turmoils including Viking invasions, and the assassination of Áed, King of The Picts in 878CE. The Kingdom of Alba became the kingdom's official name during the reign of Domnall mac Causantín, further evolving into the "Kingdom Of Scotland" in Scots and English by the 11th Century. Scottish kings would eventually style themselves using the term "rex Scottorum", or King of Scots.

After years of being ruled in a personal union, both the kingdoms of Scotland and England were dissolved to form a single unified kingdom, the Kingdom of Great Britain, in 1707. Queen Anne was the last monarch of both the kingdoms of Scotland and England and the first of Great Britain (see Union of the Crowns). Her uncle Charles II was the last monarch to be crowned in Scotland, at Scone in 1651. He had a second coronation in England ten years later.

== Heraldry ==
Royal Standard of the King of Scots

William I – James VI

James VI – Charles II

James VII

William II and Mary II

William II

Anne

== List of monarchs of Scotland ==
=== House of Alpin (848–1034) ===
The reign of Kenneth MacAlpin begins what is often called the House of Alpin, an entirely modern concept. The descendants of Kenneth MacAlpin were divided into two branches; the crown would alternate between the two, the death of a king from one branch often hastened by war or assassination by a pretender from the other. Malcolm II was the last king of the House of Alpin; in his reign, he successfully crushed all opposition to him and, having no sons, was able to pass the crown to his daughter's son, Duncan I, who inaugurated the House of Dunkeld.

Modern English name (Modern Gaelic name) (Medieval Gaelic name) Reign	Epithet	Title	Dynastic status
Kenneth I MacAlpin (Coinneach mac Ailpein) (Cináed mac Ailpín / Ciniod m. Ailpin); 843/848 – 13 February 858	An Ferbasach, "the Conqueror"	Rex Pictorum ("King of the Picts")	son of Alpin, king of Dál Riata
Donald I (Dòmhnall mac Solein) (Domnall mac Ailpín); 858 – 13 April 862	Drechruaidh, "of the Ruddy Countenance"	Rex Pictorum ("King of the Picts")	son of Alpin, king of Dál Riata, and brother of Kenneth I
Constantine I (Còiseam mac Choinnich) (Causantín mac Cináeda); 862–877	An Finn-Shoichleach, "the Wine-Bountiful"	Rex Pictorum ("King of the Picts")	Son of Kenneth I
Áed (Aodh mac Choinnich) (Áed mac Cináeda); 877–878	Fhionnscothach, "of the White Flowers"	Rex Pictorum ("King of the Picts")	Son of Kenneth I
Giric (Griogair mac Dhunghail) (Giric mac Dúngail); 878–889	Mac Rath, "Son of Fortune"	Rex Pictorum ("King of the Picts")	Son of Donald I?
Eochaid (Eochaid mac Run); 878–889?*	In Tuilti, "the Floods"	Rex Pictorum ("King of the Picts")	grandson of Kenneth I*
Donald II (Dòmhnall mac Chòiseim) (Domnall mac Causantín); 889–900	Dásachtach, "the Madman"	Rí Alban ("King of Scotland"); Rì nan Albannaich ("King of Scots")	Son of Constantine I
Constantine II (Còiseam mac Aoidh) (Causantín mac Áeda); 900–943	An Midhaise, "the Middle Aged"	Rí Alban ("King of Scotland"); Rì nan Albannaich ("King of Scots")	Son of Áed
Malcolm I (Maol Chaluim mac Dhòmhnaill) (Máel Coluim mac Domnall); 943–954	An Bodhbhdercc, "the Dangerous Red"	Rí Alban ("King of Scotland"); Rì nan Albannaich ("King of Scots")	Son of Donald II
Indulf (Ildulb mac Causantín); 954–962	An Ionsaighthigh, "the Aggressor"	Rí Alban ("King of Scotland"); Rì nan Albannaich ("King of Scots")	Son of Constantine II
Dub / Dubh or Duff (Dub mac Maíl Choluim) (Dubh mac Mhaoil Chaluim); 962–967	Dén, "the Vehement"	Rí Alban ("King of Scotland"); Rì nan Albannaich ("King of Scots")	Son of Malcolm I
Cuilén (Cuilean) (Cuilén mac Ilduilb); 967–971	An Fionn, "the White"	Rí Alban ("King of Scotland"); Rì nan Albannaich ("King of Scots")	Son of Indulf
Amlaíb (Amhlaigh) (Amlaíb mac Ilduilb); 973–977¤		Rí Alban ("King of Scotland"); Rì nan Albannaich ("King of Scots")	Son of Indulf
Kenneth II (Coinneach mac Mhaoil Chaluim) (Cináed mac Maíl Choluim); 971–995	An Fionnghalach, "the Fratricide"	Rí Alban ("King of Scotland"); Rì nan Albannaich ("King of Scots")	Son of Malcolm I
Constantine III (Còiseam mac Chailein) (Causantín mac Cuiléin); 995–997	Calvus, "the Bald"	Rí Alban ("King of Scotland"); Rì nan Albannaich ("King of Scots")	Son of Cuilén
Kenneth III (Coinneach mac Dhuibh) (Cináed mac Duib); 997 – 25 March 1005	An Donn, "the Chief"/ "the Brown"	Rí Alban ("King of Scotland"); Rì nan Albannaich ("King of Scots")	Son of Dub
Malcolm II (Maol Chaluim mac Choinnich) (Máel Coluim mac Cináeda); 1005–1034	Forranach, "the Destroyer"	Rí Alban ("King of Scotland"); Rì nan Albannaich ("King of Scots")	Son of Kenneth II

*Eochiad was a son of Run, King of Strathclyde, but his mother was a daughter of Kenneth I. Evidence of his reign is unclear. He may have never actually been king and if he was, he was co-king with Giric.

¤Amlaíb is known only by a reference to his death in 977, which reports him as King of Alba; since Kenneth II is known to have still been King in 972–973, Amlaíb must have taken power between 973 and 977.

=== House of Dunkeld (1034–1040) ===
Duncan succeeded to the throne as the maternal grandson of Malcolm II. The House of Dunkeld was therefore closely related to the House of Alpin. Duncan was killed in battle by Macbeth, another maternal grandson of Malcolm II.

Modern English name (Modern Gaelic name) (Medieval Gaelic name) Reign	Epithet	Title	Marriage(s)	Dynastic status
Duncan I (Donnchadh mac Crìonain) (Donnchad mac Crínáin); 1034–1040	An t-Ilgarach "the Diseased" or "the Sick"	Rí Alban	Suthen at least two sons	Grandson of Malcolm II (son of eldest daughter)

=== House of Moray (1040–1058) ===
Macbeth came to power in 1040 after killing Duncan I in battle and had a long and relatively successful reign. Macbeth may have been a maternal grandson of Malcolm II and thus possibly a cousin of Duncan. He married Gruoch in 1032, who may have had a claim to the Scottish throne herself, being the granddaughter of either Kenneth II or Kenneth III. In a series of battles between 1057 and 1058, Duncan's son Malcolm III defeated and killed Macbeth and Macbeth's stepson and heir Lulach and became the king, thereby passing the throne back to the House of Dunkeld.

Modern English name (Modern Gaelic name) (Medieval Gaelic name) Reign	Epithet	Title	Marriage(s)	Dynastic status
Macbeth (MacBheatha mac Fhionnlaigh) (Mac Bethad mac Findláich); 1040–1057	Rí Deircc "the Red King"	Rí Alban	Gruoch of Scotland no children	Son of Mormaer Findláech Grandson of Malcolm II (son of second daughter); Cousin of Duncan I
Lulach (Lughlagh mac Gille Chomghain) (Lulach mac Gille Comgaín); 1057–1058	Tairbith "the Unfortunate" - Fatuus "the Foolish"	Rí Alban	Unknown two children	Son of Gille Coemgáin, Mormaer of Moray and Gruoch of Scotland; Step-son of Macbeth; Great-grandson of Kenneth II or Kenneth III through his mother

=== House of Dunkeld (restored) (1058–1286) ===
In a series of battles between 1057 and 1058, Duncan's son Malcolm III defeated and killed Macbeth and Macbeth's stepson and heir Lulach, claiming the throne. The dynastic feuds did not end there: on Malcolm III's death in battle, his brother Donald III, known as "Bán", claimed the throne, expelling Malcolm III's sons from Scotland. A civil war in the family ensued, with Donald III (later supported by Malcolm III's son Edmund) opposed by Malcolm III's other sons, led first by Duncan II and then by Edgar and backed by the Kingdom of England. Edgar triumphed, sending his uncle and brother to monasteries. After the reign of David I, the Scottish throne was passed according to rules of primogeniture, moving from father to son, or where not possible, brother to brother. Alexander III was the last ruler from the house of Dunkeld, and having no sons, the throne was inherited by his granddaughter Margaret, Maid of Norway.

Modern English name (Modern Gaelic name) (Medieval Gaelic name) Reign	Epithet	Title	Marriage(s)	Dynastic status
Malcolm III (Maol Chaluim mac Dhonnchaidh) (Máel Coluim mac Donnchada); 1058–1093	Cenn Mór ("Canmore") "Great Chief"	Rí Alban / Scottorum basileus	Ingibiorg Finnsdottir three sons Margaret of Wessex; 1070 eight children	Son of Duncan I
Donald III (Dòmhnall mac Dhonnchaidh) (Domnall mac Donnchada); 1093–1097	Bán, "the Fair"	Rí Alban	Unknown at least one daughter	Son of Duncan I
Duncan II (Donnchadh mac Mhaoil Chaluim) (Donnchad mac Maíl Choluim); 1094		Rí Alban / Rex Scottorum	Ethelreda of Northumbria one son	Son of Malcolm III
Edgar (Eagar mac Mhaoil Chaluim) (Étgar mac Maíl Choluim); 1097–1107	Probus, "the Valiant"	Rí Alban / Rex Scottorum	None	Son of Malcolm III
Alexander I (Alasdair mac Mhaoil Chaluim) (Alaxandair mac Maíl Choluim); 1107–1124	"the Fierce"	Rí Alban / Rex Scottorum	Sybilla of Normandy no children	Son of Malcolm III
David I (Dàibhidh mac Mhaoil Chaluim) (Dabíd mac Maíl Choluim); 1124–1153	"the Saint"	Rí Alban / Rex Scottorum	Maud, Countess of Huntingdon; 1113 four children	Son of Malcolm III
Malcolm IV of Scotland (Maol Chaluim mac Eanraig) (Máel Coluim mac Eanric); 1153–1165	Virgo "the Maiden" - Cenn Mór, "Great Chief"	Rí Alban / Rex Scottorum	None	Grandson of David I
William I (Uilleam mac Eanraig) (Uilliam mac Eanric); 1165–1214	"the Lion" - Garbh, "the Rough"	Rí Alban / Rex Scottorum	Ermengarde de Beaumont; Woodstock Palace, Oxford, England; 5 September 1186 four children	Grandson of David I
Alexander II (Alasdair mac Uilleim) (Alaxandair mac Uilliam); 1214–1249	"the Peaceful"	Rí Alban / Rex Scottorum	Joan of England; York Minster, England; 21 June 1221 no children Marie de Coucy; Roxburgh; 15 May 1239 one son	Son of William I
Alexander III (Alasdair mac Alasdair) (Alaxandair mac Alaxandair); 1249–1286		Rí Alban / Rex Scottorum	Margaret of England; York Minster, England; 25 December 1251 three children Yolande de Dreux; Jedburgh Abbey; 15 October 1285 no children	Son of Alexander II

=== House of Sverre (1286–1290) ===
Margaret, Maid of Norway inherited the throne in 1286, but died in 1290 in Orkney on her way to be crowned. During her absence, Scotland was ruled by a set of guardians. After her death, Scotland entered a period of interregnum, where 13 contenders fought for the throne and ultimately, John Balliol succeeded.

The status of Margaret, as a Scottish monarch is debated by historians. She was never crowned, and her contemporaries in Scotland described her as "queen" very rarely, referring to her instead as Scotland's "lady", "heir", or "lady and heir". On the other hand, documents issued from late 1286 no longer refer to the "king whosoever he may be", indicating that the throne may have been regarded as already occupied by Margaret. In modern historiography she is nearly unanimously called "queen", and reference books give 19 March 1286, the date of Alexander III's death, as the start of her reign.

Name	Birth	Death	Dynastic status
Margaret the Maid of Norway; 1286–1290	c. April 1283; Tønsberg, Norway daughter of Eric II of Norway and Margaret of Scotland	September/October 1290; St Margaret's Hope, Orkney aged 7	Granddaughter of Alexander III through his daughter

=== First Interregnum (1286–1292) ===
The First Interregnum began upon the death of Alexander III of Scotland in 1286. Alexander's only surviving descendant was his granddaughter Margaret, Maid of Norway, a young child, who inherited the throne in 1286. A set of guardians were appointed to rule Scotland in her absence since she was living in Norway where her father Eric II was king. She was finally sent to Scotland in 1290 but died before arriving in Scotland. The next king of Scots was not determined until completion of an arbitration in 1292.

=== House of Balliol (1292–1296) ===
The death of Margaret of Norway began a two-year interregnum in Scotland caused by a succession crisis. With her death, the descent of William I became extinct and there was no obvious heir. Thirteen candidates presented themselves; the most prominent were John Balliol, great-grandson of William I's younger brother David of Huntingdon, and Robert de Brus, 5th Lord of Annandale, grandson of David of Huntingdon. The Scottish magnates invited Edward I of England to arbitrate the claims. He did so but forced the Scots to swear allegiance to him as their overlord. Eventually, it was decided that John Balliol should become king. He proved weak and incapable and, in 1296, was forced to abdicate by Edward I. Edward then attempted to annex Scotland into the Kingdom of England.

Name	Portrait	Birth	Marriage(s)	Death	Dynastic status
John Balliol; Toom Tabard ("Empty Cloak") (Iain Balliol); 1292–1296		c. 1249	Isabella de Warenne; 9 February 1281 at least one son	c. 25 November 1314; Picardy, France	Great-great-great-grandson of King David I (election)

=== Second Interregnum (1296–1306) ===
John Balliol abdicated in March 1296. That same month Edward I invaded Scotland. The second set of guardians were appointed under Edward I who ruled from 1296 to 1306, until the election of Robert the Bruce as the king of Scotland.

=== House of Bruce (1306–1371) ===
For ten years, Scotland had no king. The Scots, however, refused to tolerate English rule. First William Wallace and Andrew Moray, then John Comyn, and finally Robert the Bruce (the grandson of the 1292 competitor, Robert de Brus, 5th Lord of Annandale who in turn was the grandson of David of Huntingdon, younger brother of William I) fought against the English. Bruce and his supporters had murdered their rival to the throne of Scotland, John Comyn, Lord of Badenoch, on 10 February 1306 at Greyfriars Church in Dumfries. Shortly after in 1306, Robert was crowned King of Scots at Scone. Robert Bruce was then hunted down for his crime of murder, and subsequently, he escaped to the outskirt islands, leaving the country completely leaderless, and the English invaded once again. Bruce returned a year later and gained support for his cause. His energy, and the corresponding replacement of the vigorous Edward I with his weaker son Edward II in 1307, allowed Scotland to free itself from English rule. At the Battle of Bannockburn in 1314, the Scots routed the English, and by 1328 the English had agreed by treaty to accept Scottish independence. Robert's son, David, acceded to the throne as a child. The English renewed their war with Scotland, and David was forced to flee the kingdom by Edward Balliol, son of King John, who managed to get himself crowned (1332–1356) and to give away Scotland's southern counties to England before being driven out again. David spent much of his life in exile, first in freedom with his ally, France, and then in prison in England. He was only able to return to Scotland in 1357. Upon his death, childless, in 1371, the House of Bruce came to an end.

Name	Portrait	Arms	Birth	Marriage(s)	Death	Dynastic status
Robert I the Bruce (Raibeart a Briuis); 1306–1329			11 July 1274; Turnberry Castle son of Robert de Brus, 6th Lord of Annandale and Marjorie, Countess of Carrick	Isabella of Mar; 1295 one daughter Elizabeth de Burgh; Writtle, Essex, England; 1302 four children	7 June 1329; Manor of Cardross aged 54	Great-great-great-great-grandson of King David I (election)
David II (Dàibhidh Bruis); 1329–1371			5 March 1324; Dunfermline Abbey son of Robert I and Elizabeth de Burgh	Joan of England; Berwick-upon-Tweed; 17 July 1328 no children Margaret Drummond; Inchmurdach, Fife; 20 February 1364 no children	22 February 1371; Edinburgh Castle aged 46	son of Robert I (primogeniture)

=== House of Balliol (Disputed claimant) (1332–1356) ===
Edward Balliol was the son of King John Balliol, who had himself ruled for four years following his election in the Great Cause. Following his abdication, John Balliol lived out his life in obscurity in Picardy, France. During the minority of David II, Edward Balliol seized the opportunity to assert his claim to the throne, and backed by the English, he defeated the forces of David's regency and was himself crowned king at Scone in 1332. He was quickly defeated by loyalist forces and sent back to England. With English support, he would mount two more attempts to seize the throne again, in 1333 and 1335, each time his actual control of the throne was brief before being sent back to England, for the last time in 1336. When David returned from exile in 1341 to rule in his own right, Edward lost most of his support. When David II was captured in battle in 1346, Edward made one last attempt to seize the throne for himself but had little support and the campaign fizzled before it gained much traction. In 1356 he renounced all claims to the throne.

Name	Portrait	Birth	Marriage(s)	Death	Claim
Edward Balliol; 1332–1356; In opposition to David II		1283; Son of John Balliol and Isabella de Warenne	None	1367; Doncaster, England aged 83–84	Son of John Balliol, candidate of the English to replace the exiled David II

=== House of Stewart/Stuart (1371–1651) ===
Robert the Stewart was a grandson of Robert I by the latter's daughter, Marjorie. Having been born in 1316, he was older than his uncle, David II. Consequently, he was at his accession a middle-aged man, already 55, and unable to reign vigorously, a problem also faced by his son Robert III, who also ascended in middle age at 53 in 1390, and suffered lasting damage in a horse-riding accident. These two were followed by a series of regencies, caused by the youth of the succeeding five boy kings. Consequently, the Stewart era saw periods of royal inertia, during which the nobles usurped power from the crown, followed by periods of personal rule by the monarch, during which he or she would attempt to address the issues created by their minority and the long-term effects of previous reigns. Governing Scotland became increasingly difficult, as the powerful nobility became increasingly intractable. James I's attempts to curb the disorder of the realm ended in his assassination. James III was killed in a civil war between himself and the nobility, led by his son. When James IV, who had governed sternly and suppressed the aristocrats, died in the Battle of Flodden, his wife Margaret Tudor, who had been nominated regent for their young son James V, was unseated by noble feuding, and James V's wife, Mary of Guise, succeeded in ruling Scotland during the regency for her young daughter Mary I only by dividing and conquering the noble factions, distributing French bribes with a liberal hand. Finally, Mary I, the daughter of James V, found herself unable to govern Scotland faced with the surliness of the aristocracy and the intransigence of the population, who favored Calvinism and disapproved of her Catholicism. She was forced to abdicate, and fled to England, where she was imprisoned in various castles and manor houses for eighteen years and finally executed for treason against the English queen Elizabeth I. Upon her abdication, her son, fathered by Henry, Lord Darnley, a junior member of the Stewart family, became King as James VI.

James VI became King of England and Ireland as James I in 1603 when his cousin Elizabeth I died. Thereafter, although the two crowns of England and Scotland remained separate, the monarchy was based chiefly in England. Charles I, James's son, found himself faced with the Civil War. The resultant conflict lasted eight years and ended in his execution. The English Parliament then decreed their monarchy to be at an end. The Scots Parliament, after some deliberation, broke their links with England and declared that Charles II, son and heir of Charles I, would become King. He ruled until 1651 when the armies of Oliver Cromwell occupied Scotland and drove him into exile.

Name	Portrait	Arms	Birth	Marriage(s)	Death	Dynastic status
Robert II the Stewart (Raibeart II Stiùbhairt); 1371–1390			2 March 1316; Paisley Abbey son of Walter Stewart, 6th High Steward of Scotland and Marjorie Bruce	Elizabeth Mure; 1336 (uncertain canonicity); 1349 (with Papal dispensation) ten children Euphemia de Ross; 2 May 1355 four children	19 April 1390; Dundonald Castle aged 74	grandson of Robert I through his daughter (primogeniture)
Robert III (born John Stewart) the Lame King (Raibeart III Stiùbhairt, An Righ Bhacaigh); 1390–1406			c. 1337 unknown son of Robert II and Elizabeth Mure	Anabella Drummond; 1367 seven children	4 April 1406; Rothesay Castle aged about 69	son of Robert II (primogeniture)
James I (Seumas I Stiùbhairt); 1406–1437			late July 1394; Dunfermline Abbey son of Robert III and Anabella Drummond	Joan Beaufort; Southwark Cathedral; 2 February 1424 eight children	21 February 1437; Church of the Friars Preachers of Blessed Virgin and Saint Dominic at Perth aged about 42 (assassinated)	son of Robert III (primogeniture)
James II; Fiery Face (Seumas II Stiùbhairt); 1437–1460			16 October 1430; Holyrood Abbey son of James I and Joan Beaufort	Mary of Guelders; Holyrood Abbey; 3 July 1449 seven children	3 August 1460; Roxburgh Castle aged 29	son of James I (primogeniture)
James III (Seumas III Stiùbhairt); 1460–1488			10 July 1451; Stirling Castle or St Andrews Castle son of James II and Mary of Guelders	Margaret of Denmark; Holyrood Abbey; 13 July 1469 three children	11 June 1488; Sauchie Burn aged 36	son of James II (primogeniture)
James IV (Seumas IV Stiùbhairt); 1488–1513			17 March 1473; Stirling Castle son of James III and Margaret of Denmark	Margaret Tudor; Holyrood Abbey; 8 August 1503 six children	9 September 1513; Flodden Field, Northumberland, England aged 40	son of James III (primogeniture)
James V (Seumas V Stiùbhairt); 1513–1542			15 April 1512; Linlithgow Palace son of James IV and Margaret Tudor	Madeleine of Valois; Notre Dame Cathedral, Paris, France; 1 January 1537 no children Mary of Guise; Notre Dame Cathedral, Paris, France; 18 May 1538 three children	14 December 1542; Falkland Palace aged 30	son of James IV (primogeniture)
Mary I (Màiri Stiùbhairt); 1542–1567			8 December 1542; Linlithgow Palace daughter of James V and Mary of Guise	François II, King of France; 24 April 1558 no children Henry Stuart, Lord Darnley; Palace of Holyroodhouse, Edinburgh; 9 July 1565 one child James Hepburn, 4th Earl of Bothwell; Palace of Holyroodhouse; 15 May 1567 no children	8 February 1587; Fotheringhay Castle, Northamptonshire, England aged 44 (executed)	daughter of James V (cognatic primogeniture)
James VI (Seumas VI Stiùbhairt); 1567–1625		until 1603 from 1603	19 June 1566; Edinburgh Castle son of Henry Stuart, Lord Darnley and Mary I	Anne of Denmark; Old Bishop's Palace, Oslo, Norway; 23 November 1589 seven children	27 March 1625; Theobalds House, Hertfordshire, England aged 58	son of Mary I (primogeniture)
Charles I (Teàrlach I Stiùbhairt); 1625–1649			19 November 1600; Dunfermline Palace son of James VI and Anne of Denmark	Henrietta Maria of France; St Augustine's Church, Canterbury, England; 13 June 1625 nine children	30 January 1649; Palace of Whitehall, Westminster, England aged 48 (executed)	son of James VI (primogeniture)
Charles II (Teàrlach II Stiùbhairt); 1649–1651			29 May 1630; St James's Palace, Westminster, England son of Charles I and Henrietta Maria of France	Catherine of Braganza; Portsmouth, England; 14 May 1662 no children	6 February 1685; Palace of Whitehall aged 54	son of Charles I (primogeniture)

=== House of Stuart (restored) (1660–1707) ===
With the Scottish Restoration, the Stuarts became Kings of Scotland once more but Scotland's rights were not respected. During the reign of Charles II, the Scottish Parliament was dissolved and James was appointed Governor of Scotland. James II himself became James VII in 1685. His Catholicism was not tolerated, and he was driven out of England after three years. In his place came his daughter Mary and her husband William of Orange, the ruler of the Dutch Republic. The two were accepted as monarchs of Scotland after a period of deliberation by the Scottish Parliament and ruled together as William II and Mary II.

An attempt to establish a Scottish colonial empire through the Darien Scheme, in rivalry to that of England, failed, leaving the Scottish nobles who financed the venture for their profit bankrupt. This coincided with the accession of Queen Anne, daughter of James VII. Anne had multiple children but none of these survived her, leaving as her heir her half-brother, James, then living in exile in France. The English favored the Protestant Sophia of Hanover (a granddaughter of James VI) as heir. Many Scots preferred Prince James, who as a Stuart was a Scot by ancestry, and threatened to break the Union of Crowns between England and Scotland by choosing him for themselves. To preserve the union, the English elaborated a plan whereby the two Kingdoms of Scotland and England would merge into a single Kingdom, the Kingdom of Great Britain, ruled by a common monarch, and with a single Parliament. Both national parliaments agreed to this (the Scots albeit reluctantly, motivated primarily by the national finances), and some subterfuge as a total majority of signatories were needed to ratify the Scottish parliament's assent, bribes, and payments. Thereafter, although monarchs continued to rule over the nation of Scotland, they did so first as monarchs of Great Britain, and from 1801 of the United Kingdom.

Name	Portrait	Arms	Birth	Marriage(s)	Death	Claim
Charles II (Teàrlach II Stiùbhairt); 1660–1685			29 May 1630; St James's Palace; Son of Charles I and Henrietta Maria of France	Catherine of Braganza; Portsmouth, England; 14 May 1662; No children	6 February 1685; Palace of Whitehall; Aged 54	Son of Charles I (primogeniture)
James VII (Seumas VII Stiùbhairt); 1685–1688			14 October 1633; St James's Palace; Son of Charles I and Henrietta Maria of France	Anne Hyde; The Strand, London, England; 3 September 1660; Eight children Mary of Modena; Dover, England; 21 November 1673; Seven children	16 September 1701; Château de Saint-Germain-en-Laye, France; Aged 67	Son of Charles I (primogeniture)
Mary II (Màiri II Stiùbhairt); 1689–1694			30 April 1662; St James's Palace, England; Daughter of James VII (II of England) and Anne Hyde	St James's Palace; 4 November 1677; No children. A miscarriage may have rendered Mary infertile	28 December 1694; Kensington Palace, England; Aged 32	Daughter of James VII (offered the crown by the Convention of Estates)
William II (Uilleam Orains, "William of Orange"); 1689–1702		until 1694 from 1694	4 November 1650; Binnenhof, The Hague, Republic of the Seven United Netherlands; Son of William II, Prince of Orange and Mary, Princess Royal	St James's Palace; 4 November 1677; No children. A miscarriage may have rendered Mary infertile	8 March 1702; Kensington Palace; Aged 51	Grandson of Charles I (offered the crown by the Convention of Estates)
Anne (Anna Stiùbhairt); 1702–1707 (Queen of Great Britain and Ireland; 1707–1714)			6 February 1665; St James's Palace; Daughter of James VII and Anne Hyde	George of Denmark; St James's Palace; 28 July 1683; 5 children, none of whom survived childhood; 12 miscarriages and still-births	1 August 1714; Kensington Palace; Aged 49	Daughter of James VII (primogeniture); Claim of Right 1689

== Acts of Union ==
The Acts of Union were twin acts of Parliament passed during 1706 and 1707 by the Parliament of England and the Parliament of Scotland, putting into effect the terms of the Treaty of Union, agreed on 22 July 1706, following prolonged negotiation between Queen Anne's Commissioners representing both parliaments. The acts joined the Kingdom of England and the Kingdom of Scotland to form a united Kingdom of Great Britain.

Scotland and England had shared a common monarch since the Union of the Crowns in 1603 when the Scottish king James VI succeeded to the English throne. Although described as a Union of Crowns, before the Acts of Union of 1707, the crowns of the two separate kingdoms had rested on the same head. Three unsuccessful attempts (in 1606, 1667, and 1689) were made to unite the two kingdoms by acts of Parliament, but it was not until the early 18th century that the idea had the will of both political establishments to succeed, thereby bringing the two separate states together under a single parliament as well as a single monarch.

== Later claimants ==
James VII continued to claim the thrones of England, Scotland, and Ireland. When he died in 1701, his son James inherited his father's claims and called himself James VIII of Scotland and III of England and Ireland. He would continue to do so all his life, even after the Kingdoms of England and Scotland were ended by their merging as the Kingdom of Great Britain. In 1715, a year after the death of his half-sister, Queen Anne, and the accession of their cousin George of Hanover, James landed in Scotland and attempted to claim the throne. He failed and was forced to flee back to the Continent. A second attempt by his son Charles, on behalf of his father, in 1745–6, also failed. Both James's children died without legitimate issue, bringing the Stuart family to an end.

- James Francis Edward Stuart, also known as The Old Pretender, son of James VII, was claimant as "James VIII" ("James III" in England and Ireland) from 1701 until he died in 1766.
- Charles Edward Stuart, also known as The Young Pretender and often called Bonnie Prince Charlie, son of James VIII, was claimant as "Charles III" from his father's death until his death in 1788 without legitimate issue.
- Henry Benedict Stuart, brother of Charles III and youngest son of James VIII, was claimant as "Henry I" ("Henry IX" in England and Ireland). As a Catholic cleric, Henry died unmarried and without issue in 1807.

After 1807, the Jacobite claims passed first to the House of Savoy (1807–1840), then to the Modenese branch of the House of Habsburg-Lorraine (1840–1919), and finally to the House of Wittelsbach (since 1919). The current heir is Franz, Duke of Bavaria. Neither he nor any of his predecessors since 1807 have pursued their claim.

In 1971, Ugandan President Idi Amin proclaimed himself to be the uncrowned king of Scotland, although this claim gained no international recognition.

== Coronation oath ==
The Scottish coronation oath sworn by James VI, Charles I, and Charles II and approved by the Parliament of Scotland in 1567:

I, N.N., promise faithfully, in the presence of the eternal, my God, that I, enduring the whole Course of my Life, shall serve the same Eternal, my God, to the utmost of my Power, accordingly as he required in his most Holy Word, revealed and contained in the New and Old Testament; and according to the same Word shall maintain the true Religion of Jesus Christ, the preaching of his Holy Word, and due and right administration of his Sacraments, now received and practised within this Realm; and shall abolish and oppose all false Religion contrary to the same; and shall rule the People committed to my Charge, according to the Will and Command of God, revealed in his foresaid Word, and according to the lovable Laws and Constitutions received in this Realm, in no way repugnant to the said Word of the Eternal, my God; and shall procure to my utmost to the Kirk of God and whole Christian people true and perfect Peace in all times coming; the Rights and Rents, with all just privileges of the Crown of Scotland, I shall preserve and keep inviolate, neither shall I transfer nor alienate the same; I shall forbid and repress in all Estates and all Degrees theft, Oppression and all kind of Wrong; in all Judgements, I shall command and procure that Justice and Equity be kept to all creatures without exception, as he be merciful to me and you that is the Lord and Father of all Mercies; and out of all my lands and empire I shall be careful to root out all Heresy and Enemies to the true Worship of God, that shall be convicted by the true Kirk of God of the foresaid Crimes; and these Things above-written I faithfully affirm by my solemn Oath.

The coronation oath sworn by William II, Mary II and Anne was approved by the Parliament of Scotland on 18 April 1689. The oath was as follows:

WE William and Mary, King and Queen of Scotland, faithfully promise and swear, by this our solemn Oath, in presence of the Eternal God, that during the whole Course of our Life we will serve the same Eternal God, to the uttermost of our Power, according as he has required in his most Holy Word, revealed and contained in the New and Old Testament; and according to the same Word shall maintain the true Religion of Christ Jesus, the preaching of his Holy Word, and the due and right Ministration of the Sacraments, now received and preached within the Realm of Scotland; and shall abolish and gainstand all false Religion contrary to the same, and shall rule the People committed to our Charge, according to the Will and Command of God, revealed in his aforesaid Word, and according to the laudable Laws and Constitutions received in this Realm, no ways repugnant to the said Word of the Eternal God; and shall procure, to the utmost of our power, to the Kirk of God, and whole Christian People, true and perfect Peace in all time coming. That we shall preserve and keep inviolated the Rights and Rents, with all just Privileges of the Crown of Scotland, neither shall we transfer nor alienate the same; that we shall forbid and repress in all Estates and Degrees, Reif, Oppression and all kind of Wrong. And we shall command and procure, that Justice and Equity in all Judgments be kept to all Persons without exception, us the Lord and Father of all Mercies shall be merciful to us. And we shall be careful to root out all Heretics and Enemies to the true Worship of God, that shall be convicted by the true Kirk of God, of the aforesaid Crimes, out of our Lands and Empire of Scotland. And we faithfully affirm the Things above-written by our solemn Oath.

== See also ==
- Family tree of Scottish monarchs
- Holyrood Palace – The principal residence of the King of Scots.
- Duke of Rothesay – The title of the heir apparent to the Scottish throne.
- His Grace – The style of address used by the King of Scots.
- List of Scottish royal consorts
- Lord High Commissioner to the Parliament of Scotland
- Lists of monarchs in the British Isles
- List of monarchs of the British Isles by cause of death
- Burial places of British royalty

== Bibliography ==
- Anderson, Alan Orr, Early Sources of Scottish History: AD 500–1286, 2 Vols (Edinburgh, 1922).
- Broun, Dauvit (2007), Scottish Independence and the Idea of Britain. From the Picts to Alexander III., Edinburgh University Press, ISBN 978-0-7486-2360-0
- Duncan, Archibald Alexander McBeth (2002). The Kingship of the Scots, 842–1292: Succession and Independence. Edinburgh University Press. ISBN 0748616268.
- Hudson, Benjamin T., Kings of Celtic Scotland (Westport, 1994).
- Oram, Richard (2002). The Canmores: Kings & Queens of the Scots, 1040–1290. Tempus. ISBN 0752423258.
- Reid, Norman (1982). "Margaret, "Maid of Norway" and Scottish Queenship" (PDF). Reading Medieval Studies. 8: 75–96. Archived (PDF) from the original on 11 September 2022.
- Skene, W. F. (ed.), Chronicles of the Picts, Chronicles of the Scots and other Early Memorials of Scottish History (Edinburgh, 1867)
