= Château de Hélicourt =

Castle in Hauts-de-France, France

- Tilloy-Floriville, Picardy, France

Location
- Coordinates: 49.9977°N 1.5751°E

Site history
- Demolished: 1422

Château de Hélicourt was a castle near Tilloy-Floriville, Picardy, France. The former King of Scotland, John Balliol, retired to the castle after being released by Pope Boniface VIII and ended his days at the castle in 1314.

Hélicourt was confiscated from Edward Balliol by King Philip VI of France in 1338 and was placed under control of the French Crown. The castle came under siege in 1340, during King Edward III of England's summer campaign against France. The castle remained in royal hands until 1355, when it was granted to Jacques de Bourbon, Count of La Marche.

The castle was captured by an Anglo-Bourguignon force and destroyed in 1422 on the orders of Richard Beauchamp, Count of Aumale.

== Sources ==
- Beam, Amanda. G.; The Balliol Dynasty, 1210–1364, John Donald, 2008. ISBN 9781904607731
- Fordon, John; Chronica Gentis Scotorum, c. 14th century.
