= John de Warenne, 6th Earl of Surrey =

13th-century English nobleman and military commander

John de Warenne
- 6th Earl of Surrey
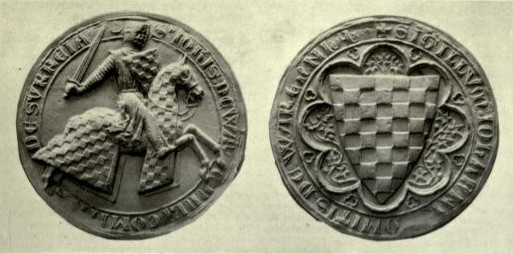
- Warenne's seal from Barons' Letter, 1301
- Predecessor: William de Warenne, 5th Earl of Surrey
- Successor: John de Warenne, 7th Earl of Surrey
- Born: 1231; Surrey, England
- Died: 27 September 1304 (aged around 73); Kennington, Surrey, England
- Residence: Holt Castle
- Noble family: Warenne
- Spouse: Alice de Lusignan (m. 1247; died 1256)
- Issue: Eleanor de Warenne; Isabella de Warenne; William de Warenne
- Father: William de Warenne, 5th Earl of Surrey
- Mother: Maud Marshal

John de Warenne, 6th Earl of Surrey (1231 – 27 September 1304) was a prominent English nobleman and military commander during the reigns of Henry III of England and Edward I of England. During the Second Barons' War he switched sides twice, ending up in support of the king, for whose capture he was present at Lewes in 1264. Warenne was later appointed as "warden of the kingdom and land of Scotland" and featured prominently in Edward I's wars in Scotland.

== Early life and marriage ==
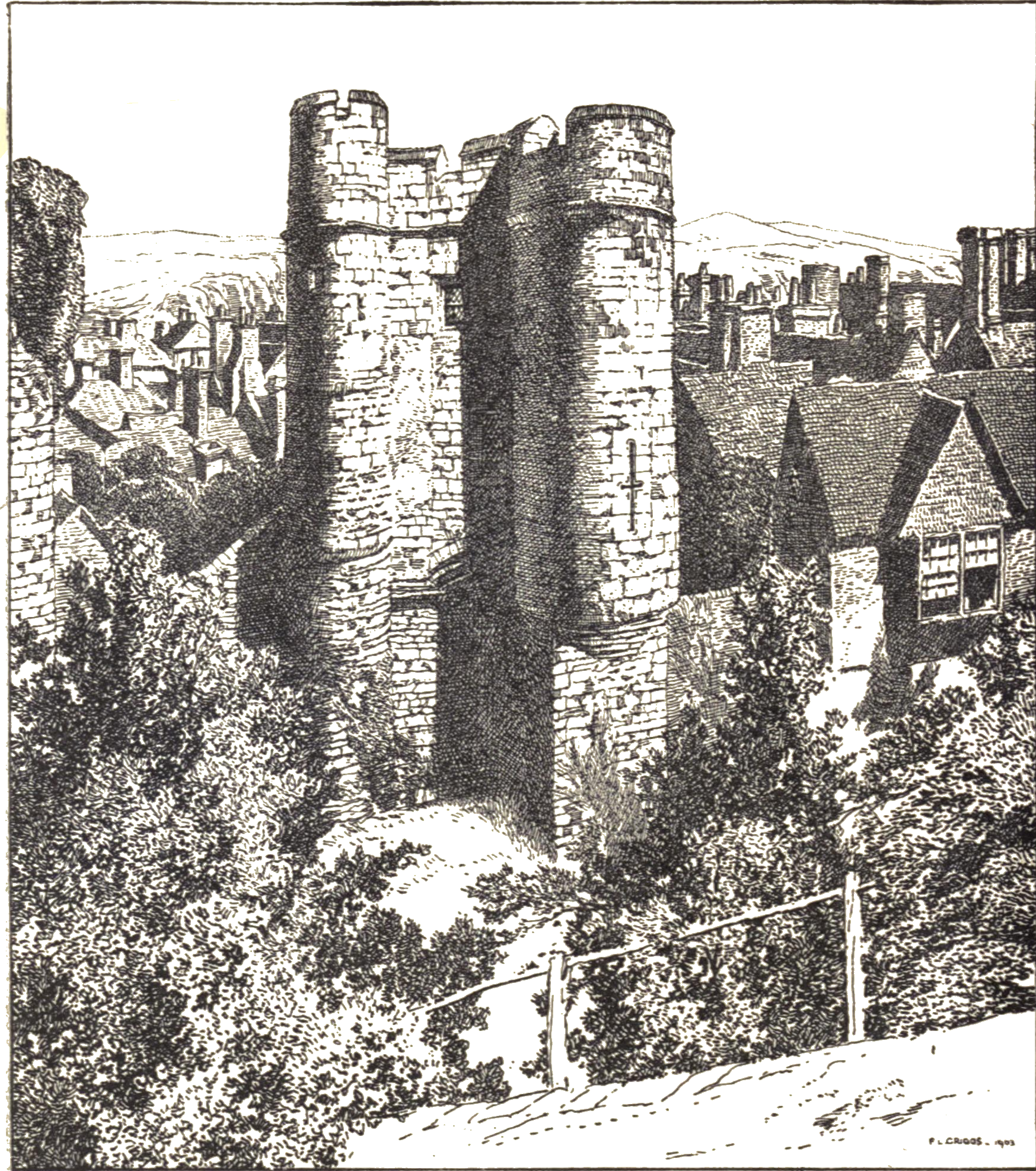
Lewes Castle, Warenne's ancestral home, built in 1069

Warenne was the son and heir of William de Warenne, 5th Earl of Surrey, and Maud Marshal. His mother was the daughter of William Marshal, 1st Earl of Pembroke and widow of Hugh Bigod, 3rd Earl of Norfolk, making Roger Bigod, 4th Earl of Norfolk his elder half-brother.

A boy when his father died, Warenne became a royal ward. Peter of Savoy was appointed guardian of his holdings and Warenne was raised at the royal court. In 1247, he married Henry III's half-sister Alice le Brun de Lusignan, a marriage that created resentment amongst the English nobility, who did not like seeing a wealthy English nobleman marrying a penniless foreigner.

During the following years, Warenne was closely associated with the court faction centering on his in-laws. In 1254, he accompanied the king's son Edward (the future Edward I) on Edward's journey to Spain to marry Eleanor of Castile.

During the conflicts between Henry III and his barons, Warenne started as a strong supporter of the king, switched to support for Simon de Montfort, and then returned to the royalist party. He opposed the initial baronial reform plan of May 1258, but along with other opponents capitulated and took the oath of the Provisions of Oxford.

== Early career and Second Barons' War ==
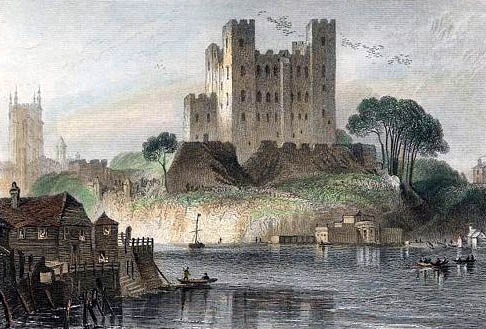
View of Rochester Castle (1836), where Warenne was besieged by de Montfort in 1264

By 1260, Warenne had joined the party of Simon de Montfort, but switched back to the king's side in 1263. In April 1264, he and Roger de Leybourne were besieged by de Montfort at Rochester Castle. In May of the same year Warenne was present for the Battle of Lewes (fought near his ancestral home, Lewes Castle). After the capture of the king and Prince Edward he fled to the Continent, where he remained for about a year. His estates were confiscated but were subsequently restored. He returned to fight in the campaign which culminated in the Battle of Evesham, the Battle of Chesterfield and the siege of Kenilworth Castle.

In 1270, Warenne and Alan la_Zouche became involved in a dispute over two manors in Northamptonshire. On 19 June the trial was proceeding before the justices at Westminster Hall. On 1 July 1270 at Westminster Hall, Warenne attacked both Zouche and his son. Zouche died of his wounds on 10 August 1270, while Warenne was fined heavily for the assault.

Warenne served in King Edward I's Welsh campaigns in 1277, 1282 and 1283. In 1282, Edward awarded him the Lordship of Bromfield and Yale in Wales, which was taken from Prince Gruffudd Fychan I and his son Madog Crypl. He also started the construction of his castle there named Holt Castle, which was continued by his son William. A good part of the following years were spent in Scotland. He was one of the negotiators for the 1289 treaty of Salisbury and for the 1290 treaty of Birgham, and accompanied the king on Edward's 1296 invasion of Scotland where he commanded the only major field action of that year in the Battle of Dunbar.

== Scotland ==
On 22 August 1296, the king appointed him "warden of the kingdom and land of Scotland". However, Warenne returned to England a few months later claiming that the Scottish climate was bad for his health. The following spring saw the rebellion of William Wallace, Warenne was ordered to lead his army North by the king after initially refusing to return to Scotland. He was defeated by Wallace at the Battle of Stirling Bridge and fled to York.

Nevertheless, the king appointed Warenne captain of the next campaign against the Scots in early 1298. He raised the siege of Roxburgh and re-took the town of Berwick. The king himself took the field later that year, and Warenne was one of the commanders during the decisive English victory at the Battle of Falkirk.

In the 1300 campaign, Warrene commanded one of four cavalry units in Edward I's army. On 8 August, near the estuary of the Cree, Edward ordered his men and Warenne's to charge at a Scottish force—causing the Scots to flee.

== Quo warranto? ==
In 1278, Edward I called a parliament at Gloucester with the intention of determining which lords had usurped royal rights—specifically, rights of adjudication—and reclaiming those rights. Walter of Guisborough tells the story that the earl was served a writ of quo warranto ("by what warrant?") as a result of these proceedings. Warenne supposedly responded by drawing a rusty sword and exclaiming that this was his warrant, saying, "My ancestors came with William the Bastard, and conquered their lands with the sword, and I will defend them with the sword against anyone wishing to seize them."

== Later years ==
Warenne died on 27 September 1304 in Kennington, Surrey. He was interred in Lewes Priory at a service conducted by the Archbishop of Canterbury. He was succeeded by his grandson, also called John.

== Issue ==
Warenne and Alice de Lusignan had three children:

- Eleanor, who married Henry Percy and was the mother of Henry de Percy, 1st Baron Percy of Alnwick (see Percy family)
- Isabella, who married John Balliol (briefly the King of Scots), and was the mother of Edward Balliol;
- William, who married Joan, daughter of Robert de Vere, 5th Earl of Oxford, and was accidentally killed at a tournament on 15 December 1286. Their son John succeeded his grandfather as earl of Surrey; their daughter Alice de Warenne married Edmund Fitzalan, 9th Earl of Arundel.

== Sources ==
- Ancestral Roots of Certain American Colonists Who Came to America Before 1700 by Frederick Lewis Weis, Lines: 83–28, 153A-20, 153A-29, 161–27.
- Waugh, Scott L. "Warenne, John de, sixth earl of Surrey (earl of Surrey and Sussex, Earl Warenne) (1231–1304), magnate". Oxford Dictionary of National Biography. Oxford University Press.
- Scott-Ellis, Baron Howard de Walden, Thomas Evelyn (1904), Some feudal lords and their seals, MCCCJ (Some feudal lords and their seals, MCCCJ. ed.), [London]: De Walden Library, OL 7163336M
- Pegge, Samuel (1769). "A succinct and authentic narrative of the Battle of Chesterfield, A.D 1266 in the reign of King Henry III". Archaeologica. XXXVI: 276–285.
- Chisholm, Hugh, ed. (1911). "Warenne, Earls" . Encyclopædia Britannica. Vol. 28 (11th ed.). Cambridge University Press. p. 324.

Peerage of England
Preceded by William de Warenne	Earl of Surrey; 1240–1304	Succeeded by John de Warenne
