= John Balliol (play) =

Play by William Tennant

John Balliol, An Historical Drama In Five Acts (1825) by William Tennant is a royalist play written from a peasants perspective. John Balliol is depicted as "a weak leader", influenced by his mother Dervorguilla of Galloway, and his rival Robert de Brus, 5th Lord of Annandale is depicted as a "noble hero". However, John is the one whose crowning is honoured by "ten thousand nobles". The play has several supernatural elements, such as a seer, omens and even references to ghosts. Valentina Bold points out that there are many similarities to The Royal Jubilee (1822), by James Hogg.

Balliol was Tennant's second dramatic failure:

"Undeterred by the failure of [ Cardinal Beaton ], Tennant, in 1825, published "John Baliol," and only added another unit to his failures. His adoption of the "toom tabard" as his hero, seemed to intimate that his own wits were run out, and the poem therefore thred as its namesake had done—it was deposed and sent into oblivion. The public now wondered, and well it might, that the rich promise given in "Anster Fair" had been so poorly redeemed. What had become of that ungovernable wit that had burst its bounds, and overflowed in such profusion? A single stanza of Rob the Ranter was worth fifty Baliols and Beatons to boot."
