= Isabella de Warenne =

Anglo-Scottish noble

- Lady of Balliol
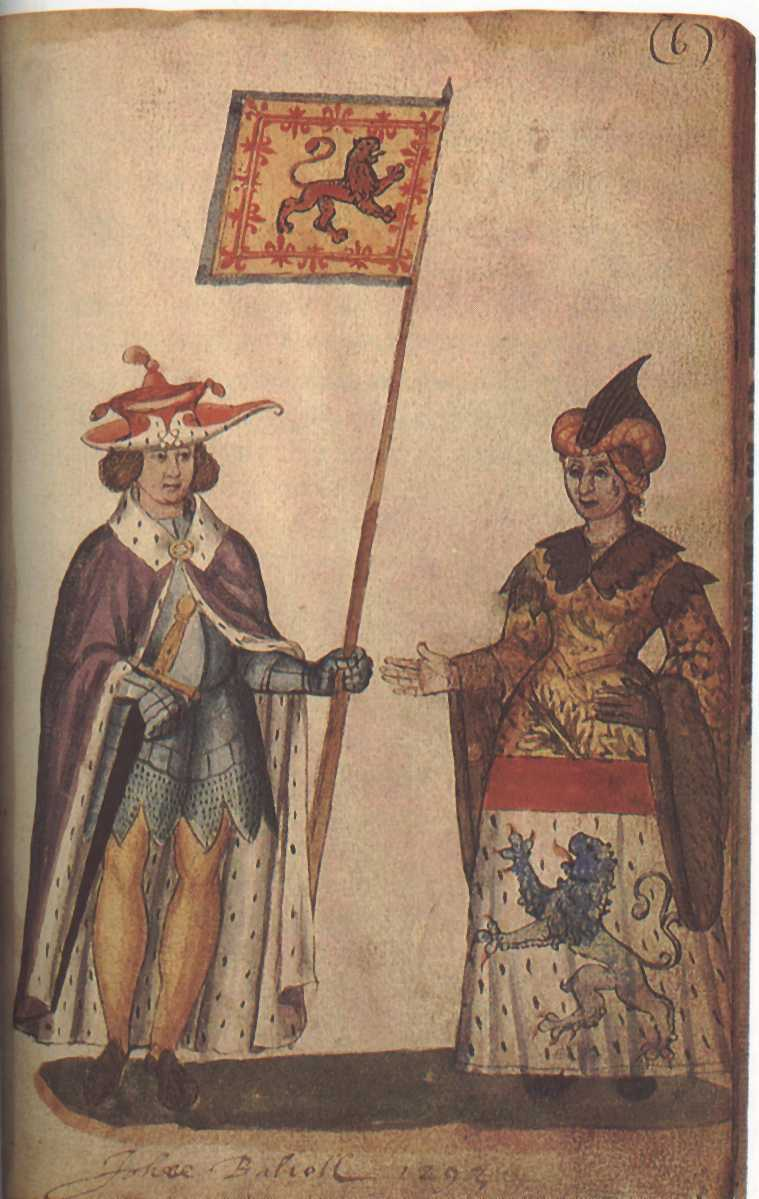
- Isabella with her husband
- Born: c. 1253
- Died: before 1292
- Noble family: Warenne
- Spouse: John Balliol
- Issue: Edward Balliol
- Father: John de Warenne, 6th Earl of Surrey
- Mother: Alice de Lusignan

Isabella de Warenne (c.1253 – before 1292) was Lady of Balliol by her marriage to John Balliol; there is, however, doubt that she lived to become queen when he succeeded to the Scottish throne.

== Family ==
Isabella was the second of three children born to John de Warenne, 6th Earl of Surrey and his wife Alice de Lusignan, maternal half-sister of Henry III of England. Her elder sister, Eleanor, married Henry Percy and became mother of Henry de Percy, 1st Baron Percy. Their mother died while giving birth to Isabella's younger brother, William, who was killed in a tournament after he had married Joan de Vere and sired two children.

== Life ==
On about 9 February 1281 Isabella married John Balliol, who had a claim to the Scottish throne. The marriage lasted about ten years. The chronicle of Thomas Wykes records the marriage. It has been established that the couple had at least one child:

- Edward Balliol, Scottish pretender (d.1364) – married to Marguerite de Taranto, daughter of Philip I, Prince of Taranto (d.1332); annulled or divorced with no issue.

However, other children have been linked to the couple as other possible issue:

- Henry de Balliol. He was killed in the Battle of Annan on 16 December 1332, leaving no issue.
- Agnes (or Maud) de Balliol – married to Bryan FitzAlan, Lord FitzAlan, and feudal baron of Bedale. They were parents to Agnes FitzAlan (b. 1298), who married Sir Gilbert Stapleton, Knt., of Bedale (1291–1324). Gilbert is better known for his participation in the assassination of Piers Gaveston, Earl of Cornwall.

It is believed that Isabella did not live to see her husband become King of Scotland, so it is likely that she died before 1292, when her husband ascended to the throne. However, some are of the opinion that Isabella did survive long enough to see her husband succeed and then abdicate.
