= Cardinal Beaton (play) =

Play written by William Tennant

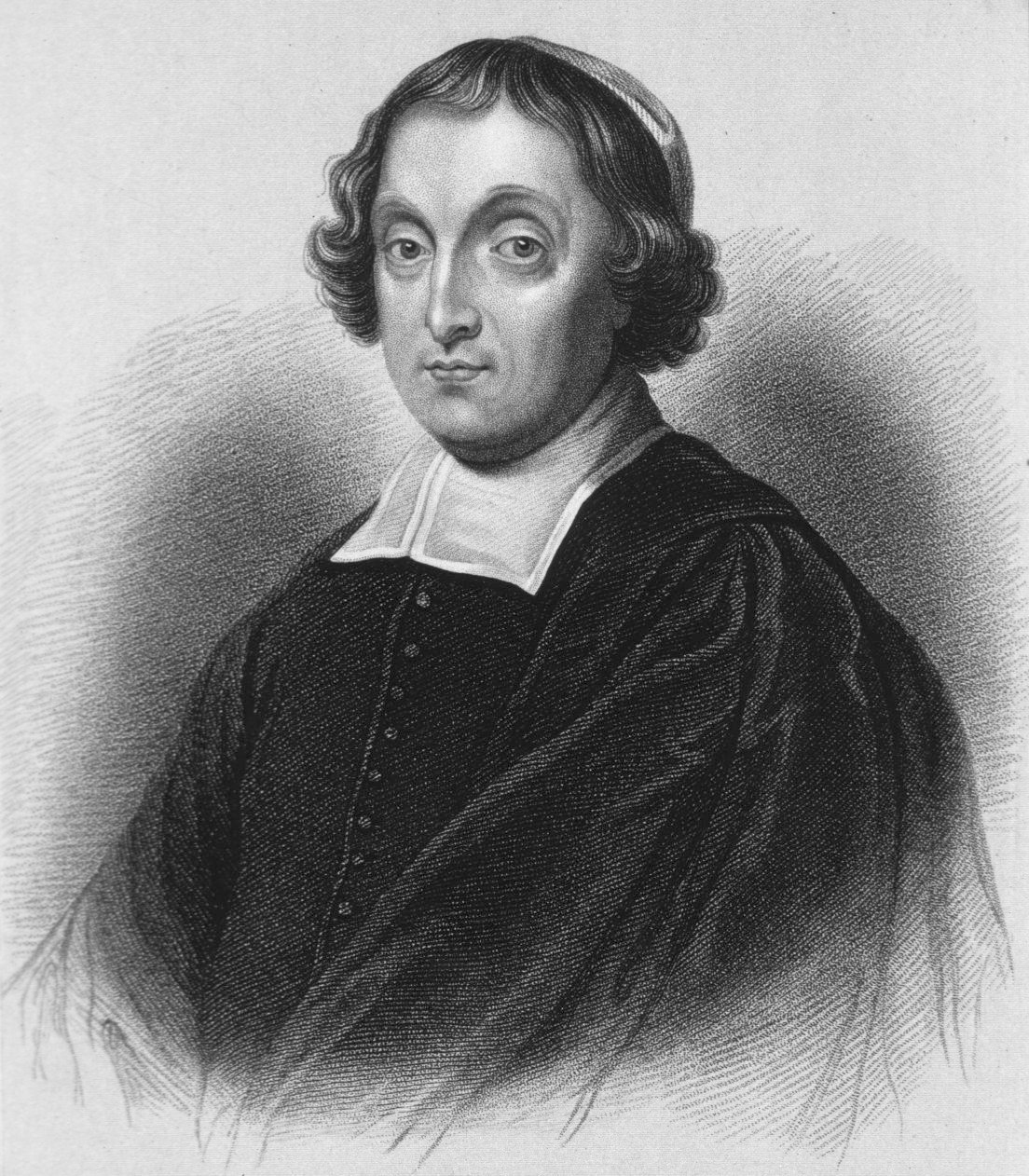
19th-century engraving of Cardinal Beaton

Cardinal Beaton; A Drama, in Five Acts (1823) is an historical drama by William Tennant based on the life of David Beaton. It was not received well.

This dramatic poem few have read, and of that few not half of the number would greatly care to remember it. The subject itself is a noble one, and the character of the cardinal, that "less than a king, yet greater," was amply fitted to develop the very highest of poetic talent. But, unluckily, the poet, instead of exhibiting this bold bad man with the lofty regal and intellectual qualities which he undoubtedly possessed, has stuck to the sordid and sensual vices with which Beaton was chargeable, and has thus converted him into a mere vulgar incubus. In fact, he has made him talk, not in the elevated language of one to whom high designs, by which Europe itself was to be shaken, were familiar, but rather after the fashion of the vulgar sensualist, who, in the phrase of Knox, "was busie at his compts with Mistris Marion Ogilbie." This was not a picture suited to the improved tastes of the day, and therefore the public would none of "Cardinal Beaton."

Tennant wrote another unsuccessful play after this, and then retired from stage writing:

"The public now wondered, and well it might, that the rich promise given in "Anster Fair" had been so poorly redeemed. What had become of that ungovernable wit that had burst its bounds, and overflowed in such profusion? A single stanza of Rob the Ranter was worth fifty Baliols and Beatons to boot. Fortunately for Tennant’s character as a poet, his retirement from the stage was calm and graceful."

David Macbeth Moir in Sketches of the Poetical Literature of the Past Half-Century described Beaton as "ineffective as a drama, but abounding in passages of high merit and interest".
