= William de Warenne (1256–1286) =

English noble

William de Warenne (9 February 1256 – 15 December 1286) was the only son of John de Warenne, 6th Earl of Surrey and his wife Alice de Lusignan.

== Life ==
William married Joan, daughter of Robert de Vere, 5th Earl of Oxford. They had the following children:

- John de Warenne, 7th Earl of Surrey (June 1286 – June 1347)
- Alice de Warenne (15 June 1287 - 23 May 1338), wife of Edmund FitzAlan, 2nd Earl of Arundel.

William was killed in a tournament at Croydon in 1286, predeceasing his father. It has been suggested that this was murder, planned by William's enemies. On the 6th Earl's death the title went to John, the only son of William. John died without legitimate children, so on his death the title passed to Richard FitzAlan, 10th Earl of Arundel, eldest son of Edmund FitzAlan and John's sister Alice.

== Ancestry ==
Ancestors of William de Warenne (1256–1286)

Geoffrey Plantagenet, Count of Anjou
Hamelin de Warenne, Earl of Surrey
William de Warenne, 5th Earl of Surrey
William de Warenne, 3rd Earl of Surrey
Isabel de Warenne, Countess of Surrey
Adela of Ponthieu, Countess of Surrey
John de Warenne, 6th Earl of Surrey
John Marshal
William Marshal, 1st Earl of Pembroke
Sybilla of Salisbury
Maud Marshal, Countess of Norfolk
Richard de Clare, 2nd Earl of Pembroke
Isabel de Clare, 4th Countess of Pembroke
Aoife of Leinster
William de Warenne
Hugues of Lusignan, co-Seigneur of Lusignan
Hugh IX of Lusignan
Orengarde
Hugh X de Lusignan
Agathe de Preuilly
Alice de Lusignan, Countess of Surrey
William IV of Angoulême
Aymer of Angoulême
Marguerite of Turenne
Isabella of Angoulême
Peter I of Courtenay
Alice of Courtenay
Elizabeth de Courtenay
