= John Balliol =

King of Scots from 1292 to 1296

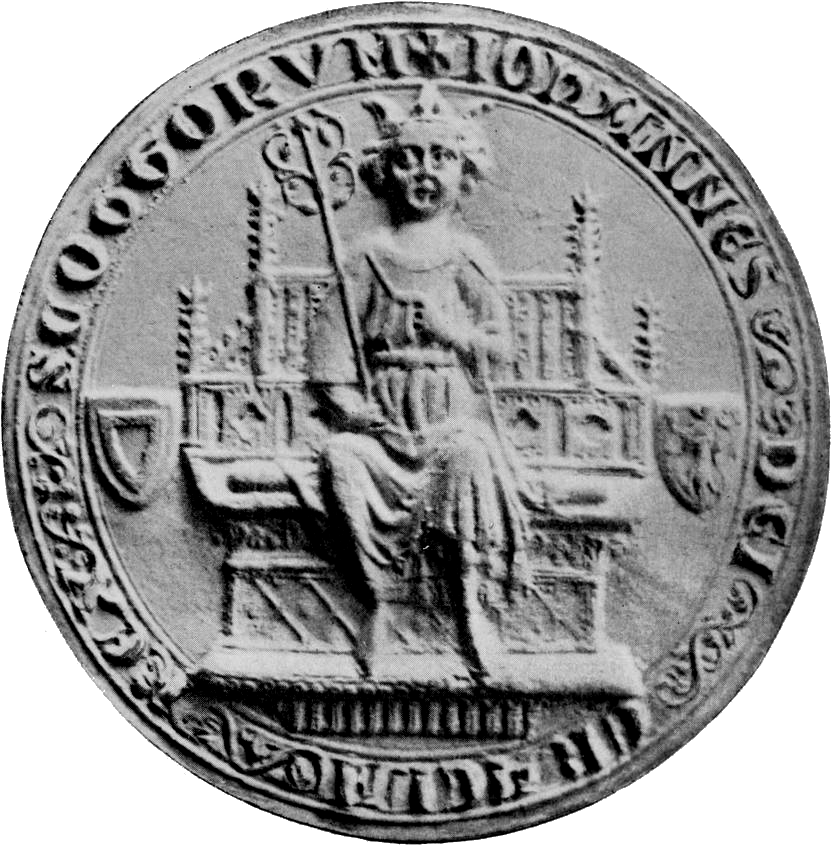
- Seal of King John

King of Scots
- Reign: 17 November 1292 – 10 July 1296
- Inauguration: 30 November 1292
- Predecessor: Margaret (1290)
- Successor: Robert I (1306)
- Born: c. 1249
- Died: late 1314 (aged around 65); Château de Hélicourt, Picardy, France
- Burial: prob. Hélicourt
- Spouse: Isabella de Warenne
- Issue: Edward Balliol
- House: Balliol
- Father: John I de Balliol
- Mother: Dervorguilla of Galloway

John (de) Balliol (c. 1249 – late 1314), known derisively as Toom Tabard (meaning 'empty coat'), was King of Scots from 1292 to 1296. Little is known of his early life. After the death of Margaret, Maid of Norway, Scotland entered an interregnum during which several competitors for the Crown of Scotland put forward claims. Balliol was chosen from among them as the new King of Scotland by a group of selected noblemen headed by King Edward I of England.

Edward used his influence over the process to subjugate Scotland and undermined Balliol's personal reign by treating Scotland as a vassal of England. Under pressure from the Scottish nobility, Balliol signed a treaty with France known as the "Auld Alliance" and renounced his fealty to Edward.

In retaliation, Edward invaded Scotland, starting the Wars of Scottish Independence. After a Scottish defeat in 1296, Balliol abdicated and was imprisoned in the Tower of London. Eventually, Balliol was sent to his estates in France and retired into obscurity, taking no more part in politics. Scotland was then left without a monarch until the accession of Robert the Bruce in 1306. John Balliol's son Edward Balliol would later exert a claim to the Scottish throne against the Bruce claim during the minority of Robert's son David.

== Name ==
Balliol arms: Gules an orle Argent

In Norman French his name was Johan de Bailliol; in Middle Scots it was Jhon Ballioun, and in Scottish Gaelic, Iain Bailiol. In Scots he was also known by the nickname Toom Tabard, usually understood to mean "empty coat" in the sense that he was an ineffective king. Alternatively the word coat may refer to a coat of arms; either to the Balliol arms which are a plain shield with an orle, also known as an inescutcheon voided or because his arms were stripped from his tabard in public.

== Early life ==
Little of Balliol's early life is known. He was born between 1248 and 1250 at an unknown location; possibilities include Galloway, Picardy, and Barnard Castle, County Durham. He was the son of John, 5th Baron Balliol, Lord of Barnard Castle (and founder of Balliol College, Oxford), and his wife Dervorguilla of Galloway, daughter of Alan, Lord of Galloway and granddaughter of David, Earl of Huntingdon — the brother of William the Lion. From his mother he inherited significant lands in Galloway and claim to lordship over the Gallovidians, as well as various English and Scottish estates of the Huntingdon inheritance; from his father he inherited large estates in England and France, such as Hitchin, in Hertfordshire.

== Accession as King of Scots ==
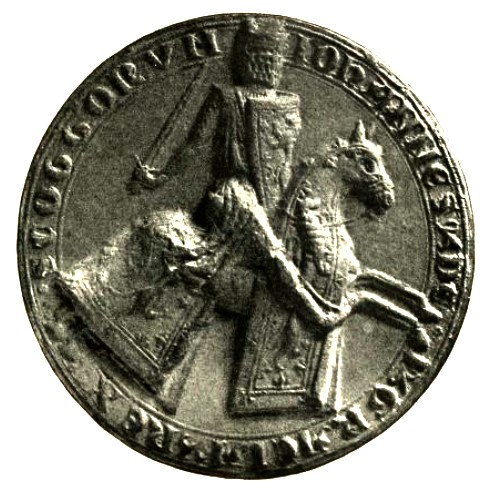
The seal of John Balliol

In 1284 Balliol had attended a parliament at Scone, which had recognised Margaret, Maid of Norway, as heir presumptive to her grandfather, King Alexander III. Following the deaths of Alexander III in 1286 and Margaret in 1290, John Balliol was a competitor for the Scottish crown in the Great Cause, as he was a great-great-great-grandson of David I through his mother (and therefore one generation further than his main rival Robert Bruce, 5th Lord of Annandale, grandfather of Robert the Bruce, who later became king), being senior in genealogical primogeniture but not in proximity of blood. He submitted his claim to the Scottish auditors with King Edward I of England as the administrator of the court, at Berwick-upon-Tweed, on 6 June 1291. The Scottish auditors' decision in favour of Balliol was pronounced in the Great Hall of Berwick Castle on 17 November 1292, and he was inaugurated accordingly King of Scotland at Scone, 30 November 1292, St. Andrew's Day.

Edward I, who had coerced recognition as Lord Paramount of Scotland, the feudal superior of the realm, steadily undermined John's authority. He demanded homage to be paid towards himself, legal authority over the Scottish king in any disputes brought against him by his own subjects, contribution towards the costs for the defence of England, and military support was expected in his war against France. He treated Scotland as a feudal vassal state and repeatedly humiliated the new king. According to some English accounts, such as the Lanercost Chronicle, the Scots soon tired of their deeply compromised king and the direction of affairs was taken out of his hands by the leading men of the kingdom, who appointed a council of twelve — in practice, a new panel of guardians — at Stirling in July 1295. This has been challenged by recent historians; Amanda Beam argues that Balliol was not deposed, and that this council was formed to assist in the defence of the realm against England. Balliol continued to issue charters in his name for the remainder of his reign, demonstrating that he was still playing an active role as king. Assisted by the council, Balliol went on to conclude a treaty of mutual assistance with Philip IV of France on 23 October 1295, known in later years as the "Auld Alliance". By the terms of the alliance, Balliol's son Edward was betrothed to Philip's niece, Joan of Valois.

== Abdication ==
In retaliation for Scotland's treaty with France, Edward I invaded, commencing the Wars of Scottish Independence. The Scots were defeated at Dunbar and the English took Dunbar Castle on 27 April 1296. John abdicated at Stracathro, near Montrose, on 10 July 1296.

Balliol was imprisoned in the Tower of London until allowed to go to France in July 1299. When his baggage was examined at Dover, the Royal Golden Crown and Seal of the Kingdom of Scotland, with many vessels of gold and silver, and a considerable sum of money, were found in his chests. Edward I ordered that the crown be offered to the shrine of St Thomas Becket at Canterbury and that the money be returned to Balliol for the expenses of his journey. But he kept the seal himself. Balliol was released into the custody of Pope Boniface VIII on condition that he remain at a papal residence. He was released around the summer of 1301 and lived the rest of his life on his family's ancestral estates at Hélicourt, Picardy.

Over the next few years, there were several Scottish rebellions against Edward (for example, in 1297 under William Wallace and Andrew Moray). When Wallace was chosen as commander, he claimed to act in the name of his king, John Balliol. This claim came to look increasingly tenuous, as Balliol's position under nominal house-arrest meant that he could not return to Scotland nor campaign for his release, despite the Scots' diplomatic attempts in Paris and Rome. After 1302, he made no further attempts to extend his personal support to the Scots.

== Death ==
Balliol died in late 1314 at his family's château at Hélicourt in France. On 4 January 1315, King Edward II of England, writing to King Louis X of France, said that he had heard of the death of "Sir John de Balliol" and requested the fealty and homage of Edward Balliol to be given by proxy.

A John de Bailleul is interred in the church of St. Waast at Bailleul-Neuville in Normandy.

Balliol was survived by his son, Edward Balliol, who later revived his family's claim to the Scottish throne, received support from the English, and had some temporary successes.

== Marriage and children ==
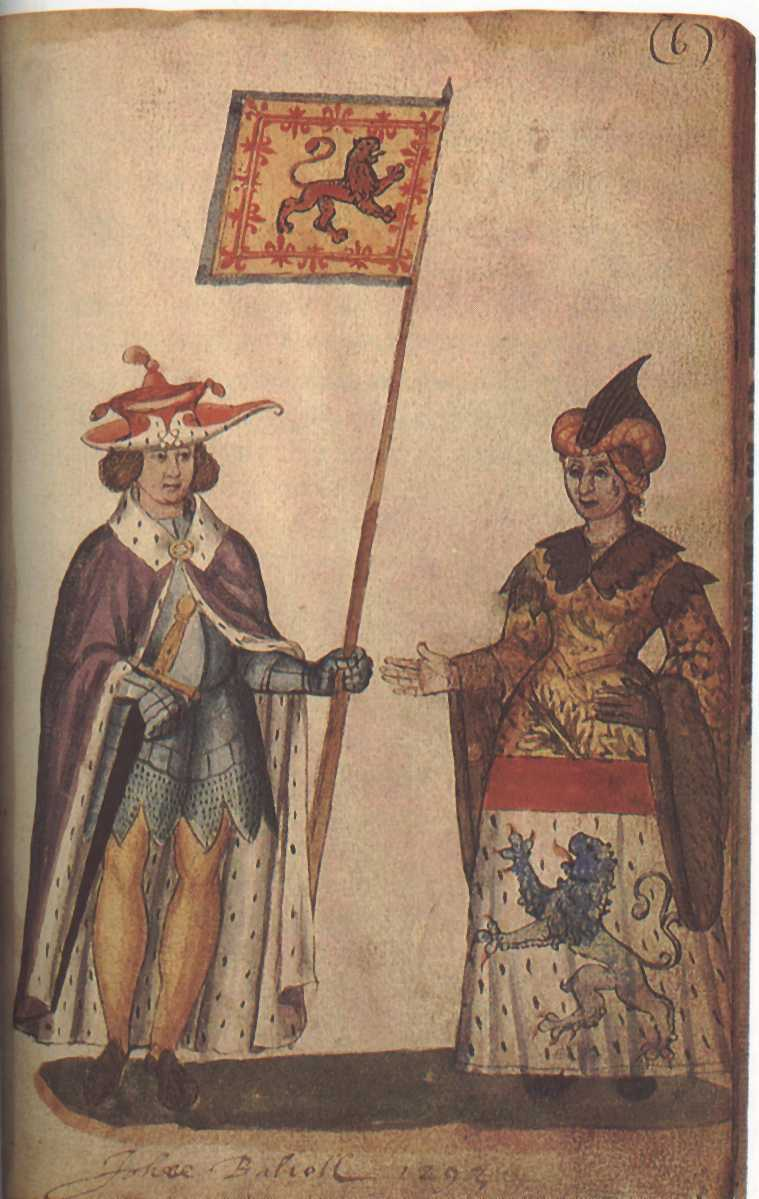
John Balliol and his wife

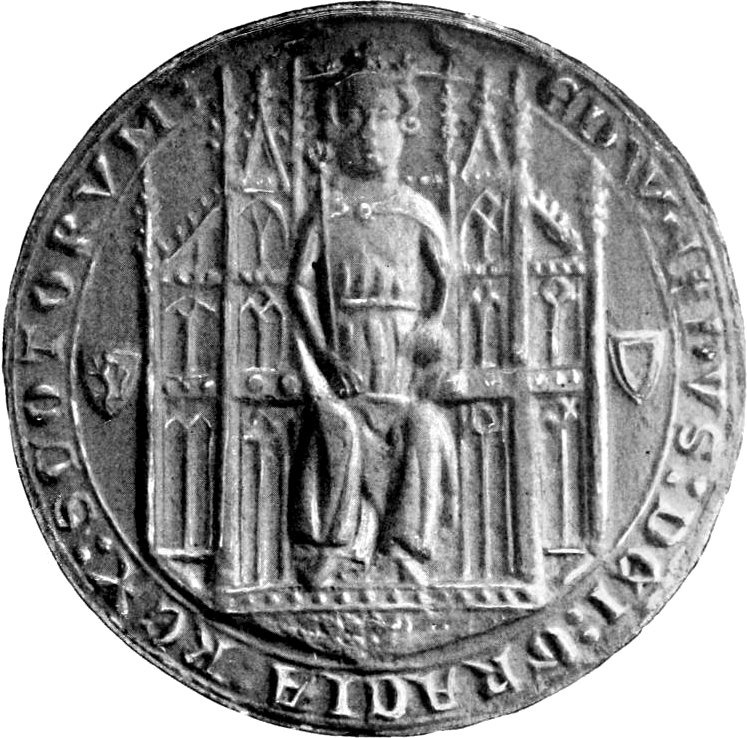
Edward Balliol, King of Scotland seal

Balliol married around 9 February 1281 to Isabella de Warenne, daughter of John de Warenne, 6th Earl of Surrey.

It has been established that Balliol and de Warenne had at least one child, Edward Balliol. Other children linked to the couple include Henry Balliol, killed in the Battle of Annan on 16 December 1332, Agnes (or Maud or Anne) Balliol (who might actually have been his sister), who married Bryan FitzAlan, Lord FitzAlan, and Margaret Balliol who married Sir John St Clere, knight, of East Grinsted, Sussex.

== Fictional portrayals ==
- John Balliol, An Historical Drama. In Five Acts (1825), play based on his life by William Tennant.

== See also ==
- Scottish monarchs' family tree

== Sources ==
- Bold, Valentina (2007), James Hogg: a bard of nature's making, Peter Lang, ISBN 9783039108978
- Rymer, Thomas, Foedera Conventions, Literae et cuiuscunque generis Acta Publica inter Reges Angliae, London, 1745. (Latin)
- Chambers, Robert; Thomson, Thomas Napier (1857). "Baliol, John" . A Biographical Dictionary of Eminent Scotsmen . Vol. 1. Glasgow: Blackie and Son. pp. 116–121 – via Wikisource.
- Mackay, Aeneas James George (1885). "Baliol, John de (1249-1315)" . Dictionary of National Biography. Vol. 03. pp. 66–70.

John Balliol House of Balliol Born: ? c. 1249 Died: November 1314
Regnal titles
Vacant Title last held by Margaret	King of Scots; 1292–1296	Vacant Title next held by Robert I
