= William Tennant (poet) =

Scottish scholar and poet

William Tennant (16 May 1784 – 14 October 1848) was a Scottish scholar and poet.

== Life ==
He was born at Anstruther, Fife.

He was lame from childhood. His father sent him to the University of St Andrews, where he remained for two years, and on his return he became clerk to one of his brothers, a corn factor. In his leisure time he mastered Hebrew as well as German and Italian.

His study of Italian verse bore fruit in the mock-heroic poem of Anster Fair (1812), which gave an amusing account of the marriage of "Maggie Lauder," the heroine of the popular Scottish ballad. It was written in the ottava rima adopted a few years later by "the ingenious brothers Whistlecraft" (John Hookham Frere), and turned to such brilliant account by Byron in Don Juan. The poem, unhackneyed in form, full of fantastic classical allusions applied to the simple story, and brimming over with humour, had an immediate success. It is said to be the first use of this Italian style in Britain. He was a member of the Anstruther Musimanik Society, a literary society.

Tennant's brother, meanwhile, had failed in business, and the poet became in 1812 schoolmaster of the parish of Dunino, near St Andrews. From this he was promoted (1816) to the school at Lasswade, near Edinburgh; from that (1819) to a mastership in Dollar Academy; from that (1834), by Lord Jeffrey, to the professorship of oriental languages (having mastered Hebrew, Arabic and Persian by this stage) at the University of St Andrews. The Thane of Fife (1822), shows the same humorous imagination as Anster Fair, but the subject was more remote from general interest, and the poem fell flat.

He also wrote a poem in Lowland Scots, Papistry Stormed (1827); two historical dramas, Cardinal Beaton (1823) and John Balliol (1825); and a series of Hebrew Dramas (1845), founded on incidents in Bible history.

He died at Devon Grove, on 14 February 1848.

Tennant's plays proved to be disappointing and unsuccessful:

"The public now wondered, and well it might, that the rich promise given in "Anster Fair" had been so poorly redeemed. What had become of that ungovernable wit that had burst its bounds, and overflowed in such profusion? A single stanza of Rob the Ranter was worth fifty Baliols and Beatons to boot. Fortunately for Tennant’s character as a poet, his retirement from the stage was calm and graceful."

A Memoir of Tennant by MF Connolly was published in 1861.
