= Edward Balliol =

Claimant to the Scottish throne from 1332 to 1356

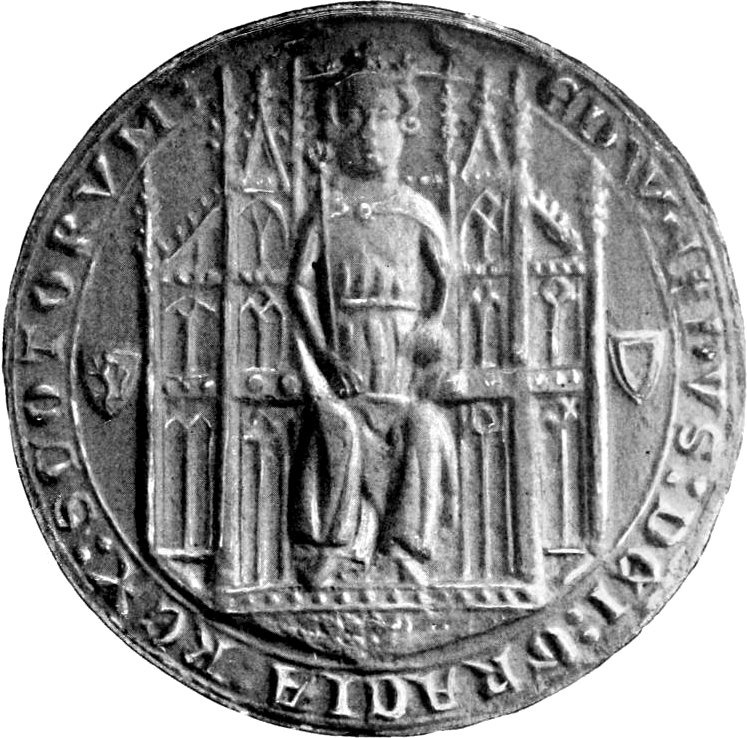
- Edward's seal

Contested King of Scots
- Reign: 24 September 1332 – 20 January 1356
- Contender: David II of Scotland
- Born: c. 1283; Cavers, Roxburghshire, Kingdom of Scotland
- Died: January 1364 (aged around 81); Wheatley, Doncaster, Kingdom of England
- House: Balliol
- Father: John Balliol
- Mother: Isabella de Warenne

Edward Balliol or Edward de Balliol (Scottish Gaelic: Èideard Balliol; c. 1283 – January 1364) was a claimant to the Scottish throne during the Second War of Scottish Independence. With English help, he ruled parts of the kingdom from 1332 to 1356.

== Early life ==
Edward was the eldest son of John Balliol and Isabella de Warenne. When his father negotiated an alliance with France in 1295, Edward was betrothed to Joan of Valois, the eldest daughter of Charles, Count of Valois (1271–1325) and his first wife Marguerite of Anjou (1273–1299). When John resigned his title as King of Scotland in 1296, the betrothal was cancelled.

Following his father's abdication, Balliol was a prisoner in the Tower of London until 1299, when he was released into the custody of his grandfather John de Warenne, 6th Earl of Surrey. Balliol could possibly have been involved in the "Soules Conspiracy", a plot to depose king Robert I and possibly to install Balliol on the throne led by William II de Soules. Balliol possibly married Margaret of Taranto, daughter of Philip I, Prince of Taranto around 1331. If this marriage did take place, it was childless and had been annulled by the time Balliol made his bid for the Scottish crown in 1332.

== Claimant to the Scottish throne ==
The death of King Robert I in June 1329 left his six-year-old son David II as King and one of King Robert's ablest lieutenants, Thomas Randolph, the Earl of Moray, as regent. Around this time, Balliol was recruited by "the disinherited", men whose Scottish lands and titles had been confiscated by Robert I following the Battle of Bannockburn. These men included Henry de Beaumont, David III Strathbogie, and Gilbert de Umfraville, son of Robert de Umfraville, Earl of Angus. In 1332 the disinherited and Balliol made plans for an invasion of Scotland, covertly supported by Edward III of England. Following the death of Randolph on 20 July 1332, the disinherited along with several English adventurers such as Walter Manny and Thomas Ughtred invaded. Balliol's forces defeated the new regent, the Earl of Mar, at the Battle of Dupplin Moor in Perthshire on 11 August 1332.

Edward Balliol was crowned at Scone on 24 September 1332, but three months later he was forced to flee back to England, following a surprise attack by nobles loyal to David II at the Battle of Annan. On his retreat from Scotland, Balliol sought refuge with the Clifford family, land owners in Westmorland, and stayed in their castles at Appleby, Brougham, Brough, and Pendragon.

In early 1333, Edward III openly declared his support for Balliol as king. Balliol returned to Scotland with Edward and an English army in the summer, capturing Berwick and defeating the Scottish forces at the Battle of Halidon Hill. Balliol, under the Treaty of Newcastle (1334), then ceded the whole of the district formerly known as Lothian to Edward and paid homage to him as liege lord while staying in Blackfriars friary in Newcastle upon Tyne. He was also betrothed to Edward III's sister Joan of the Tower, who was already married to David II. Despite David II fleeing Scotland for France, Balliol's position was still not secure, and infighting between his supporters along with frequent fighting from pro-Bruce forces caused Balliol to flee Scotland once again. In November 1334, Edward III and Balliol invaded again, but unable to bring the Scots to battle, they retreated in February 1335. On 30 November 1335, a pro-Balliol army under the command of Strathbogie was defeated at the Battle of Culblean, which was the effective end of Balliol's attempt to overthrow the King of Scots.

In early 1336, a truce was proposed with intervention from Philip VI of France. The truce would have recognized Balliol as king and allowed him to marry princess Joan, and David II would become his heir. David however, rejected the treaty. Edward III and Balliol returned again in July 1336 with a large English army and advanced through Scotland, first to Glasgow and then to Perth, destroying the surrounding countryside as they went but by late 1336, the Scots had regained control over virtually all of Scotland, and by 1338 the tide had turned against the usurper.

Edward Balliol returned to Scotland after the defeat of King David II at the Battle of Neville's Cross in 1346 and with a small force raised an insurrection in Galloway in a final attempt to gain the crown of Scotland. He only succeeded in gaining control of some of Galloway, with his power diminishing there until 1355.

== Final years ==
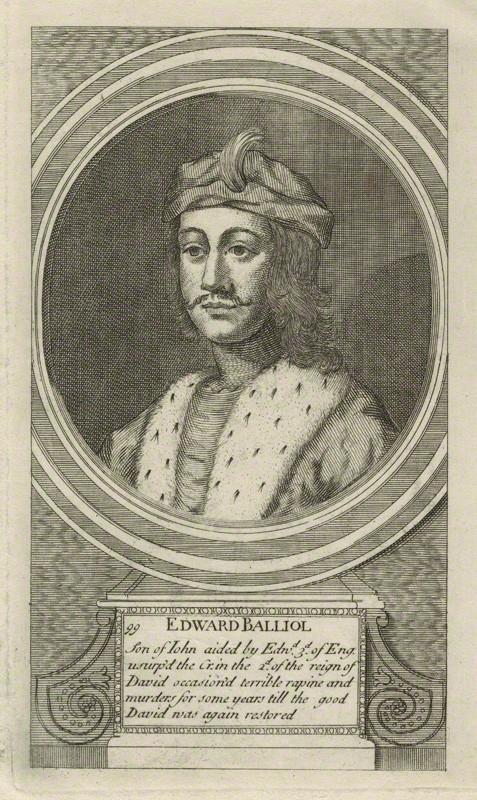
Engraving of Edward Balliol from the 18th century

On 20 January 1356, Balliol surrendered his claim to the Scottish throne to Edward III in exchange for an English pension of £2,000 per year. He spent the rest of his life living near Yorkshire and died childless in January 1364, at Wheatley, Doncaster. The location of his grave has been speculated to be under a Doncaster Post Office.

== Sources ==
=== Primary ===
- Ashley, W. J., ed. (1887). Edward III and His Wars, 1327–1360. London: D. Nutt.
- Bain, Joseph, ed. (1881–1888). Calendar of Documents Relating to Scotland (4 vols. ed.). Edinburgh: H.M. General Register House.
- Bower, Walter (1987–1998). Watt, D. E. R. (ed.). Scotichronicon: In Latin and English (9 vols. ed.). Aberdeen: Aberdeen University Press.
- Capgrave, John (1858). The Book of the Illustrious Henries. trans. Francis Charles Hingeston. London: Longman, Brown, Green, Longmans, & Roberts.
- Galbraith, V. H., ed. (1970) [1927]. The Anonimalle Chronicle, 1333 to 1381. Manchester: Manchester University Press. ISBN 0-389-03979-9.
- Gray, Thomas (1907). Scalacronica: The Reigns of Edward I, Edward II and Edward III. trans. Herbert Maxwell. Glasgow: J. Maclehose.
- Skene, William F., ed. (1872). John of Fordun's Chronicle of the Scottish Nation. trans. Felix J. H. Skene. Edinburgh: Edmonston and Douglas.
- Wilson, James (2001) [1913]. The Chronicle of Lanercost, 1272–1346. trans. Herbert Maxwell. Cribyn, Wales: Llanerch Press. ISBN 1-86143-109-0.

=== Secondary ===
- Balfour-Melville, E. M. W. (1954). Edward III and David II. London: G. Philip.
- Beam, Amanda (2008). The Balliol Dynasty, 1210–1364. Edinburgh: John Donald.
- Campbell, James (1965). "England, Scotland and the Hundred Years War in the fourteenth century". In Hale, J. R.; Highfield, J. R. L.; Smalley, B. (eds.). Europe in the Late Middle Ages. London: Faber and Faber.
- Dalrymple, David (1776–1779). Annals of Scotland: From the Accession of Malcolm III Surnamed Canmore to the Accession of Robert I. London: J. Murray.
- Nicholson, Ranald (1965). Edward III and the Scots: The Formative Years of a Military Career, 1327–1335. London: Oxford University Press.
- Paterson, R. C. "Edward Balliol", in Military History, April 2003.
- Ramsay, J. H., "Edward Balliol's Scottish Campaign in 1347", in English Historical Review, vol. 25, 1910.
- Ramsay, James H. (1913). Genesis of Lancaster; or, The Three Reigns of Edward II, Edward III and Richard II, 1307–1399. Oxford: Clarendon Press.
- Reid, R. C., "Edward de Balliol", in Transactions of the Dumfriesshire and Galloway Antiquarian and Natural History Society, vol. 35 1956–1957.
- Summerson, Henry; Trueman, Michael; Harrison, Stuart (1998), "Brougham Castle, Cumbria", Cumberland and Westmorland Antiquarian and Archaeological Society Research Series, Cumberland and Westmorland Antiquarian and Archaeological Society, ISBN 1-873124-25-2
- Webster, B., "Scotland without a King, 1329–1341", in Medieval Scotland, Crown, Lordship and Community, ed A. Grant and K. J. Stringer, 1993.
- Webster, Bruce (2004). "Balliol, Edward". Oxford Dictionary of National Biography (online ed.). Oxford University Press. doi:10.1093/ref:odnb/1206. (Subscription, Wikipedia Library access or UK public library membership required.)
