= Bacon (surname) =

People with family name "Bacon"

- Pronunciation: /ˈbeɪkən/
- Language: English

Origin
- Region of origin: Normandy; England

Other names
- Variant forms: Bachun, Bacun (early sources)

Bacon is an English surname originally from Normandy and England.

== Etymology ==
Its etymology is uncertain, with Charnock favoring a derivation from a diminutive of Germanic bach ("little stream, creek") (Note: Cognate with Old Norse bekkr which gave its name to Bec Abbey in Normandy.) and others from an eponymous seigniory in Normandy or from a corruption of Beacon.

== People ==
- Albion Fellows Bacon (1865–1933), American reformer and writer
- Alice Bacon (disambiguation)
  - Alice Martha Bacon (1909–1993), English politician and baroness
- Amanda Chantal Bacon, American entrepreneur
- Anne Bacon (c. 1528–1610), English scholar, translator, and lady of the British court
- Anthony Bacon (disambiguation)
  - Anthony Bacon (1796–1864), British cavalry officer during the Napoleonic wars
  - Anthony Bacon (1718–1786), English-born merchant and industrialist
- Antoinette Frissell Bacon (1907–1988), American photographer; better known as Toni Frissell
- Arthur Bacon (1905–1942), English footballer
- Augustus O. Bacon (1839–1914), American politician
- Benjamin Wisner Bacon (1860–1932), American theologian
- Benoit-Antoine Bacon, Canadian neuropsychologist
- Bertha Bacon (1866–1922), British suffragette
- Brady Bacon (b. 1990), American race car driver
- Butts Bacon (1580–1661), English politician; one of the Bacon baronets
- Cecil W. Bacon (1905–1992), British artist and illustrator
- Charles Bacon (disambiguation)
  - Charles Bacon (1821–1886), English sculptor
- Charlotte Bacon (disambiguation)
  - Lady Charlotte Bacon (1801–1880), English aristocrat
- Chris Bacon (disambiguation) several people
  - Chris Bacon (boxer) (born 1969), Australian Olympic judoka and boxer
- Christylez Bacon (born 1986), American hip-hop musician
- Clara Latimer Bacon (1866–1948), American mathematician
- Clarrie Bacon Clarence George Bacon (1889–1954), English footballer
- Cyril Bacon (1919–2001), English footballer
- Cyrus Bacon (c. 1796–1873), American politician
- Everett Bacon C. Everett "Ev" Bacon (1890–1989), American football player
- C. Shannon Bacon (born 1971 or 1972), American judge
- Daisy Sarah Bacon (1898–1986), American magazine editor
- Daniel Bacon (disambiguation) several people
  - Daniel S. Bacon (1798–1866), American politician and judge
- David Bacon (disambiguation) several people
  - David Bacon (missionary) (1771–1817), American missionary and explorer
  - David Bacon (photojournalist) (born 1948), American photojournalist
  - David F. Bacon (born 1963), American computer programmer
- Delia Bacon (1811–1859), American Anti-Stratfordian
- Dick Bacon (1932–2000), nudist from Wisconsin
- Dolores Bacon (1870–1934), American novelist
- Don Bacon (disambiguation) several people
  - Don Bacon (microbiologist) (1926–2020), from New Zealand
  - Don Bacon (baseball) (born 1935), American baseball player and manager
  - Don Bacon (born 1963), American politician
- Dorothy Bacon, American lawn and indoor bowls player
- Dorothy Carolin Bacon (1902–1998), American economist
- Dwayne Bacon (born 1995), American basketball player
- Edgar Bacon (disambiguation), several people
  - Edgar Bacon (1887–1963), British wrestler
- Edmund Bacon (disambiguation), several people
  - Edmund Bacon (1785–1866), American business manager and overseer for Thomas Jefferson
  - Edmund Bacon (architect) (1910–2005), American urban planner
  - Sir Edmund Bacon, 13th Baronet (1903–1982), British landowner and businessman; one of the Bacon baronets
- Edward Bacon (disambiguation) several people
  - Edward Denny Bacon (1860–1938), knighted British philatelist
  - Edward Woolsey Bacon (1843–1887), American Congregational preacher and writer
- Edwin Munroe Bacon (1844–1916), American writer and editor
- Elijah W. Bacon (c. 1836–1864), Union Army Medal of Honor recipient
- Elizabeth Bacon (disambiguation), several people
  - Elizabeth Bacon (c. 1541–1621), English aristocrat
  - Elizabeth D. Bacon (1844–1917), American suffragist and educator
- Emily Bacon (1891–1972), American pediatrician
- Ephraim Bacon (c. 1780–1826), American church minister
- Ernest Bacon (1893–1966), British wrestler and civil servant
- Ernie Bacon (1896–1972), English footballer
- Ernst Bacon (1898–1990), American composer and pianist
- Eugen Bacon, Tanzanian-Australian computer scientist and author of speculative fiction
- Eugenia Jones Bacon (1840–1920), American writer
- Eugenia M. Bacon (1853–1933), American suffragist and public library advocate
- Eva Bacon (1909–1994), Australian socialist, feminist, and pacifist
- Evan Bacon (born 1997), American LEGO-artist and software developer
- Evelyn Bacon (born 1949), Canadian politician
- Ezekiel Bacon (1776–1870), American politician
- Faith Bacon (1910 –1956), American dancer and actress
- Francis Bacon (disambiguation), several people
  - Francis Bacon (1561–1626), English lawyer, philosopher, statesman, and author
  - Francis Bacon (artist) (1909–1992), Anglo-Irish painter
  - Francis Thomas Bacon (1904–1992), British engineer
- Frank Bacon (disambiguation), several people
  - Frank Bacon (actor) (1864–1922), American actor and playwright
  - Frank L. Bacon (1841–1917), American politician
- Frederick Bacon (disambiguation), several people
  - Fred Bacon (died 1954), British runner
  - Frederick J. Bacon (1871–1948) American banjo player and manufacturer
  - Frederick S. Bacon (1877–1861) American football coach
- Gareth Bacon (born 1972), British Conservative politician
- Gaspar G. Bacon (1886–1947), American politician
- George Bacon (disambiguation), several people
  - George B. Bacon (1836–1876), American Congregational preacher and writer
  - George Washington Bacon (1830–1922), American cartographer and publisher
- Georgeanna Muirson Woolsey Bacon (1833–1906), American author and nurse; better known as Georgeanna Woolsey
- Gertrude Bacon (1874–1949), British writer, aeronaut and botanist
- Guy Bacon (1936–2018), Canadian politician
- Helen H. Bacon (1919–2007), American classical philologist
- Henry Bacon (disambiguation), several people
  - Henry Bacon (painter) (1839–1912), American painter
  - Henry Bacon (1866–1924), American architect
- Irving Bacon (1893–1965), American character actor
- James Bacon (disambiguation), several people
  - James Bacon (judge) (1798–1895), British judge
  - Jim Bacon (politician) (1950–2004), Premier of Tasmania, Australia
  - Jim Bacon (rugby) (1896–1968), Welsh rugby union and rugby league footballer
- Jamie, Jonathan, and Jarrod Bacon, Bacon Brothers Canadian gangsters
- Janet Ruth Bacon (1891–1965), British educator
- Jaylen Bacon (born 1996), American sprinter
- Jean Bacon (born 1942), British computer scientist
- Jeff Bacon, Australian gunsmith and politician
- Jennifer Bacon, American attorney, educator, and politician
- J. S. Bacon Jeremiah S. Bacon (1858–1939), American politician
- Joanna Bacon (born 1962), British architect
- John Bacon (disambiguation), several people
  - John Bacon (1290–1347), English Carmelite friar and philosopher known as John Baconthorpe
  - John Bacon (Massachusetts politician) (1728–1820), US politician from Massachusetts
  - John Bacon (sculptor, born 1740) (1740–1799), British sculptor
  - John Bacon (sculptor, born 1777) (1777–1859), British sculptor
  - John E. Bacon (South Carolina politician) (1830–1897), American lawyer, politician, diplomat, and judge
  - John Henry Frederick Bacon (1865–1914), British painter and illustrator
  - John Mackenzie Bacon (1846–1904), English astronomer, aeronaut, and lecturer
  - John Mosby Bacon (1844–1913), United States Army general
- Joséphine Bacon (born 1947), Innu poet
- Josephine Daskam Bacon (1876–1961), American writer
- Jules Bacon (1917–2007), American bodybuilder
- Kelyn Bacon (born 1973), British judge; also known as Kelyn Meher Bacon Darwin
- Ken Bacon (disambiguation), several people
  - Kenneth Bacon (1944–2009), American journalist
  - Ken Bacon (politician) (born 1944), Australian politician
- Katherine Bacon (1896–1982), English classical pianist
- Kevin Bacon (disambiguation), several people
  - Kevin Bacon (born 1958), American film actor
- Lander McCoy Bacon (1942–2008), American football player known as Coy Bacon
- Lee Bacon (born 1979), American children's author
- Leonard Bacon (disambiguation), several people
  - Leonard Bacon (1802–1881), American Congregational preacher and writer
  - Leonard Bacon (poet) (1887–1954), American poet, translator, and literary critic
- Lindo Bacon, American nutritionist
- Lise Bacon (1934–2025), Canadian politician
- Liz Bacon (born 1963), Canadian professor of computer science
- Lloyd Bacon (1889–1955), American actor
- Lori Bacon (born 1959), Canadian entrepreneur
- Louis Bacon (musician) (1904–1967), American jazz musician
- Louis Bacon (born 1956), American hedge fund manager and billionaire
- Louisa Mary Bacon (1800–1885), British musician and writer; better known as Louisa Barwell
- Lucy Bacon (1857–1932), American artist
- Mabel Marks Bacon (1876 –1966), American hotelier
- Mae Bacon (1897–1981), British actress
- Mark R. Bacon (1852–1941), American politician
- Margaret Bacon (disambiguation), several people
  - Margaret Frances Bacon (1895–1987), American artist and author; better known as Peggy Bacon
- Margaretha Bacon (1903–1977), American singer; better known as Greta Keller
- Maria Helena Bacon (1906–2001), American musician, choral conductor, educator, and athlete; better known as Madi Bacon
- Marjorie May Bacon (1902–1988), English printmaker and painter
- Mary Bacon (1948–1991), American thoroughbred jockey and model
- Mathew Bacon (c. 1700 – c. 1775), British legal writer
- Matthew Bacon (cricketer) (born 1993), New Zealand cricketer
- Max Bacon (disambiguation) several people
  - Max Bacon, British rock singer for Nightwing and GTR
  - Max Bacon (politician) (born 1941), Missouri jurist and legislator
- Michael Bacon (disambiguation), several people
  - Michael Bacon (musician) (born 1949), American musician
- Montagu Bacon (1688–1749), English scholar and critic
- Nathaniel Bacon (disambiguation), several people
  - Nathaniel Bacon of Stiffkey (died 1622), English lawyer and politician
  - Nathaniel Bacon (painter) (1585–1627), knighted English painter, landowner and horticulturist
  - Nathaniel Bacon (English politician) (1593–1660), English politician
  - Nathaniel Bacon (Virginia colonist) (1647–1676), Virginia colonist and instigator of Bacon's Rebellion
- Nicholas Bacon (disambiguation), several people
  - Nicholas Bacon (Lord Keeper) (1510–1579), English politician and Lord Keeper of the Great Seal
  - Sir Nicholas Bacon, 1st Baronet, of Redgrave (c. 1540–1624), English politician; first of the Bacon baronets
  - Nicholas Bacon (Ipswich MP) (c. 1622–1687) English politician
  - Sir Nicholas Bacon, 14th Baronet (born 1953), British baronet, lawyer, and Page of Honour to Queen Elizabeth II
- Nick Bacon (1945–2010), American soldier and Medal of Honor recipient
- Orrin Bacon (1821–1893), American politician
- Paul Bacon (disambiguation), several people
  - Paul Bacon (1907–1999), French politician
- Percy Charles Haydon Bacon, British stained-glass artist and sculptor
- Peter C. Bacon (1804–1886), American lawyer
- Phanuel Bacon (1700–1783), English playwright, poet, and author
- Philemon Bacon (died 1666), captain in the Royal Navy
- Philip Bacon (born 1947), Australian art dealer and philanthropist
- Phoebe Bacon (born 2002), American swimmer
- Randall Bacon, American actor and football player
- Ranulph Bacon (1906–1988), British police officer
- Reginald Bacon (1863–1952), Royal Navy admiral
- Richard Bacon (disambiguation)
  - Richard Bacon (politician) (born 1962), British politician
  - Richard Bacon (broadcaster) (born 1975), English television and radio presenter
- Rick Bacon (born 1955), Canadian volleyball player
- Robert Bacon (disambiguation), several people
  - Robert Bacon (d. 1248), English Dominican writer
  - Robert Bacon (1860–1919), American diplomat
  - Robert Low Bacon (1884–1938), American politician
- Roger Bacon (disambiguation), several people
  - Roger Bacon (1214–1295), Franciscan friar, English philosopher
- Romain Bacon (born 1990), French cyclist
- Ronald Bacon (born 1946), American respiratory therapist and politician
- Ronnie Bacon (1935–2020), English footballer
- Ruth E. Bacon (1908–1985), American foreign service officer
- Samuel Bacon (1781–1820), American lawyer, newspaper editor, and colonist
- Sarah Bacon (born 1996), American diver
- Scott Bacon (born 1977), Australian politician, son of Jim Bacon
- Selden D. Bacon (1909–1992), Yale professor of sociology and alcoholism researcher
- Sosie Bacon (born 1992), American film actress
- Stanley Bacon Bacon (1885–1952), British wrestler
- Steevi Bacon, musician from London
- Sylvia Bacon (1931–2023), judge of the Superior Court of the District of Columbia
- Thomas Bacon (disambiguation), several people
  - Thomas Bacon (academic) (died 1559), English academic
  - Thomas Bacon (priest) (1711/1712–1768), Anglican clergyman
  - Thomas Rutherford Bacon (1850–1913), American Congregational preacher, historian
- Tim Bacon (1964–2016), British actor and restaurateur
- Tony Bacon, American table football player
- Venancio "Anciong" Bacon, inventor of Balintawak Eskrima
- Virginia Cleaver Bacon (1883–1930), Oregon State Librarian
- Virginia P. Bacon (1853–1919), American heiress and art dealer
- Waine Bacon (b. 1979), American football player
- Waller Bacon (c. 1669–1734), British lawyer and Whig politician
- Walter Bacon (disambiguation), several people
- Wendy Bacon (b. 1946), Australian academic, investigative journalist, and political activist
- William J. Bacon (1803–1889), American politician and judge
- William Thompson Bacon (1812–1881), American minister, editor, and author
- Winchel Bacon (1816–1894), American politician
- W. Meredith Bacon (1946–2026), American political scientist and LGBT rights activist
- Yehuda Bacon (born 1929), Israeli artist and Holocaust survivor

== Other people with the name "Bacon" ==
- Albert Bacon Fall (1861–1944), American politician
- Anne Bacon Drury (1572–1624), English literary patron
- Bacon Rind (c. 1860–1932), Osage politician
- Camille Bacon-Smith, American scholar and novelist
- Elizabeth Bacon Custer (1842–1933), American journalist and memoirist
- Florence Hannah Bacon Marsh (1881–1948), British botanist
- George Bacon Wood (1797–1879), American physician
- Harriet Bacon MacDonald (1865–1935), American musician
- John Bacon McDonald (1859–1927), United States Army general
- John Bacon Sawrey Morritt (c. 1772–1843), British politician
- Joseph Bacon Fraser (1895–1971), US Army general
- Joseph Bacon Fraser Jr. (1926–2014), American architect
- June Bacon-Bercey (1928–2019), American meteorologist
- Linus B. Comins (1817–1892), American politician
- Matthew Bacon Sellers Jr. (1869–1932), American inventor and scientist
- Peter Bacon Hales (1950–2014), American historian, professor, musician, and photographer
- Samuel Bacon Hillocks (1869–1937), Canadian politician, minister, and inventor
- Sarah Bacon Tunnicliff (1872–1957), American clubwoman
- Sydney Bacon Palmer (1890–1954), British clubman
- Thomas B. Fugate (1899–1980), American politician
- Tilman B. Parks (1872–1950), American lawyer and politician
- Wilbur Bacon Camp (1860–1918), American architect
- Wilford Bacon Hoggatt (1865–1938), American naval officer and sixth Governor of Alaska
- William B. Oliver (1867–1948), American politician
- William Bacon Stevens (1815–1887), American bishop
- William Bacon Wright (1830–1895), Confederate politician

== Fictional characters ==
- Abra Bacon, character in John Steinbeck's East of Eden
- Don Bacon, the main antagonist of the mobile game Angry Birds Evolution
- Sam Bacon, character in Grange Hill

== Further lists ==
- Ed Bacon (disambiguation)
- General Bacon
- Justice Bacon (disambiguation)
- Senator Bacon
- Bacon baronets, a position in the English peerage held by several Bacons

== See also ==
- Bacon (disambiguation)
