= John Bacon =

John Bacon may refer to:

== Art ==
- John Bacon (sculptor, born 1740) (1740–1799), British sculptor
- John Bacon (sculptor, born 1777) (1777–1859), British sculptor
- John Henry Frederick Bacon (1865–1914), British painter and illustrator

== Military ==
- John M. Bacon (1844–1913), American general
- John Bacon (loyalist) (died 1783), loyalist guerilla fighter during the American Revolutionary War

== Politics and government ==
- John Bacon (English judge) (died 1321), English judge
- John Bacon (Massachusetts politician) (1738–1820), US Representative from Massachusetts
- John E. Bacon (South Carolina politician) (1830–1897), South Carolina politician, diplomat
- John E. Bacon (Arizona politician) (1869–1964), Arizona politician, doctor
- John F. Bacon (1789–1860), clerk of the New York State Senate, and U.S. Consul at Nassau, Bahamas
- John L. Bacon (1878–1961), mayor of San Diego, California
- John Lement Bacon (1862–1909), Vermont banker, businessman and politician

== Sports ==
- John Bacon (footballer) (born 1973), Irish footballer
- John Bacon (cricketer) (1871–1942), English cricketer

== Others ==
- John Mackenzie Bacon (1846–1904), English astronomer, aeronaut, and lecturer
- John Bacon (clerk) (1738–1816), British clerk and editor
- John Bacon (landlord) (died 1824), friend of Robert Burns
- John U. Bacon (born 1964), American author
- John Baconthorpe, a.k.a. John Bacon (c. 1290–1346), English Carmelite friar
- John Bacon (Dedham) (died 1683), early American settler
