= Representative Bacon =

Several individuals named Bacon have served as United States state or federal representatives, including:

- Augustus Octavius Bacon (1839-1914), Georgia state representative (1871–1886)
- Cyrus Bacon, Michigan state representative (1849)
- Daniel S. Bacon, Michigan state representative (1839)
- Don Bacon (1963-), U.S. representative for Nebraska's 2nd congressional district (2017-)
- John Bacon (Massachusetts politician) (1738-1820), state representative (1801-1803)
- Kevin Bacon (politician) (1971-), Ohio state representative (2007–2010)
- Robert Bacon (Iowa politician) (1959-), state representative (2013-)
- Robert L. Bacon (1884-1938), U.S. representative from New York's 1st district (1923-1938)

== See also ==
- Bacon (name)
