= Judge Bacon =

Judge Bacon may refer to:

- Daniel S. Bacon (1798–1866), Michigan judge
- Francis Bacon (1561–1626), Lord Chancellor of England
- Francis Bacon (judge) (1587–1657), English judge
- James Bacon (judge) (1798–1895), British judge of the Court of Chancery
- John Bacon (English judge) (died 1321), English judge
- John Bacon (Massachusetts politician), judge of the Common Pleas of Massachusetts
- Kelyn Bacon (born 1973), British High Court judge
- Max Bacon (politician) (born 1941), judge of the Greene County, Missouri circuit court
- Sylvia Bacon (1931–2023), judge of the Superior Court of the District of Columbia
- Thomas Bacon (judge) (fl. 1336), English judge of the Common Pleas

== See also ==
- Justice Bacon (disambiguation)
