= Edgar Bacon (disambiguation) =

Edgar Bacon (1887–1963) was a British wrestler.

Edgar Bacon may also refer to:

- Edgar Mayhew Bacon (1855–1935), American author
- Edgar Bacon (baseball) (Edgar Suter Bacon, 1895–1963), American baseball player

== See also ==
- Ed Bacon (disambiguation)
- Edward Bacon (disambiguation)
- Edmund Bacon (disambiguation)
- Edwin Bacon (disambiguation)
