= Frederick Bacon =

Frederick Bacon may refer to:

- Fred Bacon, British runner
- Frederick J. Bacon (1871–1948), American banjoist and banjo manufacturer
- Frederick S. Bacon (1877–1961), American football coach
- John Henry Frederick Bacon (1865–1914), British painter
