= The Coronation of King George V =

1911 painting by John Henry Frederick Bacon

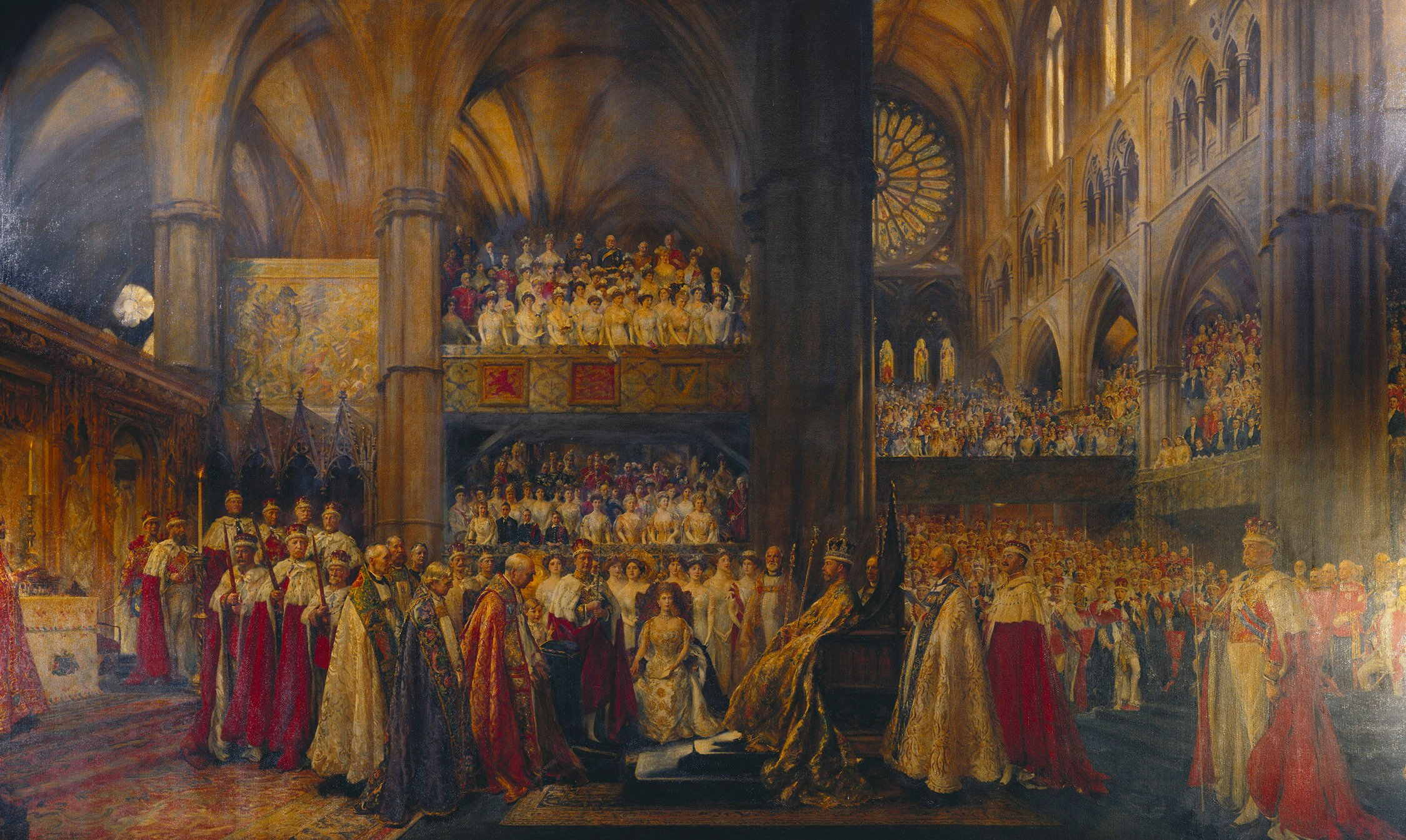
- Artist: John Henry Frederick Bacon
- Year: 1911
- Type: Oil on canvas, historical painting
- Dimensions: 336.2 cm × 552.5 cm (132.4 in × 217.5 in)
- Location: Royal Collection, London

The Coronation of King George V is a painting from 1911 by the British artist John Henry Frederick Bacon. It depicts in oils the coronation of George V at Westminster Abbey on 22 June 1911. George was forty four when he succeeded his father King Edward VII to the throne on 6 May 1910 and went on to reign until 1936.

Bacon was commissioned to produce the official portrait of the coronation service while Laurits Tuxen to paint a more intimate portrait. Bacon was given a space on the north side of the Sacrarium facing the Royal Box to work on sketches of the service. George V is depicted seated on the Coronation Chair holding the Sceptre with the Cross and the Sceptre with the Dove. In front of him is the Archbishop of Canterbury and to his right is Queen Mary, who is placed closed to the painting's centre. Standing behind the Queen in the gallery (from left to right) are Princess Mary, Prince Albert, Prince Henry, Prince George, the Princess Royal, Princess Helena, the Duchess of Argyll, and Princess Beatrice. George and Mary took part in sittings at the artist's studio in February and March 1912 before the painting went on display at the Royal Academy Summer Exhibition in the same year. Mary was particularly impressed with the results. The painting is on long term loan to the Palace of Westminster, while interior sketches made for the commission and photogravures of the painting are kept at London Museum and the National Portrait Gallery.
