= Robert Bacon (disambiguation) =

Robert Bacon (1860–1919), U.S. Secretary of State and diplomat

Robert Bacon may also refer to:

- Robert Bacon (writer) (died 1248), Dominican writer in England
- Robert Bacon (MP) (c. 1562–1633), English MP for St Ives
- Sir Robert Bacon, 3rd Baronet (1574–1655), English gentry
- Robert L. Bacon (1884–1938), U.S. Representative for New York, banker and soldier
- Tubby Bacon (Robert Bacon, 1930–2012), American baseball team owner
- Bob Bacon (born 1935), American politician in Colorado
- Robert Bacon (Iowa politician) (born 1955), American politician in Iowa
- Robert Bacon (footballer) (born 1989), English association footballer

== See also ==
- Robert Bacon House (built 1830), historic house in Winchester, Massachusetts
