= Don Bacon (disambiguation) =

Don Bacon (born 1963) is an American politician from Nebraska.

Don Bacon may also refer to:

- Don Bacon (microbiologist) (1926–2020), New Zealand professor of microbiology
- Don Bacon (baseball) (born 1935), minor league baseball player and manager
- Don Bacon, the main antagonist of the mobile game Angry Birds Evolution
