= Richard Bacon =

Richard Bacon may refer to:

== People ==
- Sir Richard Bacon, 7th Baronet (Redgrave), 8th Baronet (Mildenhall) (1695–1773), see Bacon baronets
- Sir Richard Bacon, 3rd Baronet (c. 1663–1685), see Bacon baronets
- Richard Bacon (politician) (born 1962), English Conservative politician, Member of Parliament for South Norfolk since 2001
- Richard Bacon (broadcaster) (born 1975), English television and radio presenter
- Richard Mackenzie Bacon (1775–1844), English Whig journalist and musician
- Richard Noverre Bacon (1798–1884), English newspaper editor and writer

== Other ==
- HMT Richard Bacon, a Castle class trawler of the Royal Navy

== See also ==
- Dick Bacon (1932–2000), American nudist or naturist from Milwaukee, Wisconsin
- Rick Bacon (born 1955), Canadian volleyball player
