= George Robert Gray =

English ornithologist and curator

George Robert Gray FRS
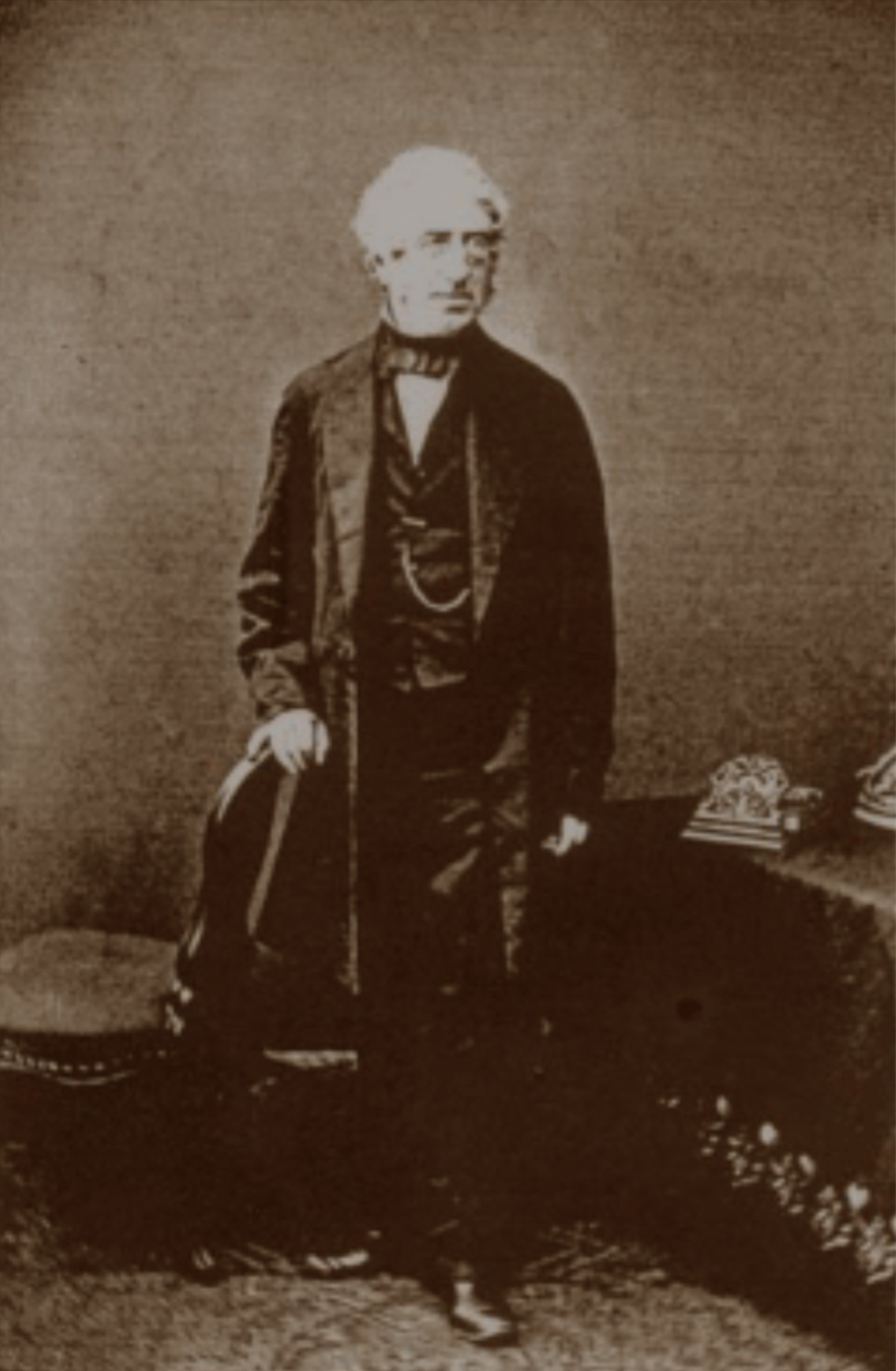
- Undated photograph of Gray
- Born: 8 July 1808; Little Chelsea, London, England
- Died: 6 May 1872 (aged 63); London, England
- Known for: Genera of Birds, description of many species of Lepidoptera
- Parent(s): Samuel Frederick Gray; Elizabeth Forfeit
- Relatives: John Edward Gray (brother)
- Scientific career
- Fields: Ornithologist, entomologist
- Workplaces: British Museum
- Author abbrev. (zoology): G. R. Gray

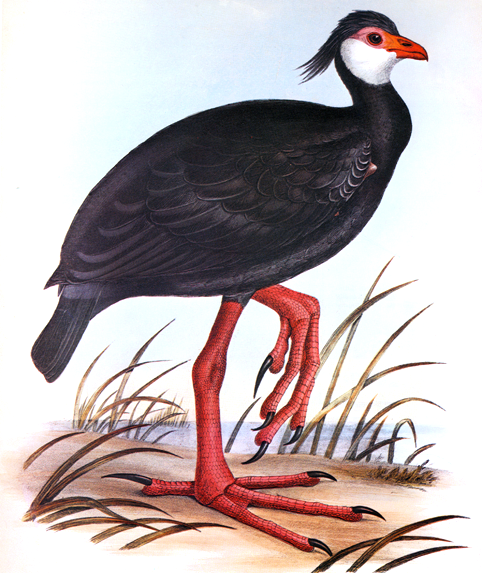
Chauna chavaria. Plate from Genera of Birds

George Robert Gray FRS (8 July 1808 – 6 May 1872) was an English zoologist and author, and head of the ornithological section of the British Museum, now the Natural History Museum, London for forty-one years. He was the younger brother of the zoologist John Edward Gray and the son of the botanist Samuel Frederick Gray.

George Gray's most important publication was his Genera of Birds (1844–49), illustrated by David William Mitchell and Joseph Wolf, which included 46,000 references.

== Biography ==
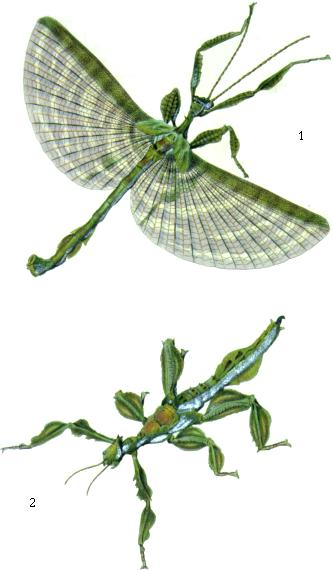
Plate 8 from The Monograph of the Genus Phasma, showing Extatosoma tiaratum

He was born on 8 July 1808 in Little Chelsea, London, to Samuel Frederick Gray, naturalist and pharmacologist, and Elizabeth (née Forfeit), his wife. He was educated at Merchant Taylor's School.

Gray started at the British Museum as Assistant Keeper of the Zoology Branch in 1831.

He began by cataloguing insects, and published an Entomology of Australia (1833) and contributed the entomogical section to an English edition of Georges Cuvier's Animal Kingdom. Gray described many species of Lepidoptera. In 1833, he was a founder of what became the Royal Entomological Society of London.

Gray's original description of Gray's grasshopper warbler, which was named for him, appeared in 1860. The specimen had been collected by Alfred Russel Wallace in the Moluccas. In a brief biography dealing with Gray's work on phasmids, Bragg credits Gray with more than doubling the number of named species of phasmids with three publications (in 1833, 1835 and 1843); three species of phasmids were subsequently named after Gray.

Gray died on 6 May 1872 in London, England.

== Works ==
- 1831 The Zoological Miscellany Zool. Miscell. (1): [1] 1–40
- 1833 The Entomology of Australia, in a series of Monographs. Part I. The Monograph of the Genus Phasma. London.
- 1835 Synopsis of the species of insects belonging to the family of Phasmidae. London, Longmans. 48pp.
- 1843 Description of several species of the genus Phyllium. Zoologist, (1)1: 117–123.
- 1844 List of the specimens of birds in the collection of the British Museum. London, Trustees of the British Museum.
- 1846 Descriptions and Figures of some new Lepidopterous Insects chiefly from Nepal. London, Longman, Brown, Green, and Longmans.
- Gray G. R. (1844–1849). The Genera of Birds: Comprising their Generic Characters, a Notice of the Habits of Each Genus, and an Extensive list of Species Referred to their Several Genera, Vol. 1, Vol. 2, Vol. 3: London: Longman, Brown, Green, and Longmans.
- 1852 Catalogue of Lepidopterous Insects in the British Museum. Part 1. Papilionidae. [1853 Jan], "1852" iii + 84pp., 13pls.
- 1871 A fasciculus of the Birds of China. London, Taylor and Francis.
- with Richard Bowdler Sharpe, The Zoology of the Voyage of HMS Erebus & HMS Terror. Birds of New Zealand., 1875. The revised edition of Gray (1846) (1875).

== See also ==
- European and American voyages of scientific exploration
