= Max Bacon (disambiguation) =

Max Bacon is a British rock singer for Nightwing and GTR.

Max Bacon may also refer to:

- Max Bacon (politician) (born 1941), Missouri jurist and legislator
- Max Bacon (actor) (1906–1969), British musician and film and TV actor
