= Daniel Bacon (disambiguation) =

Daniel Bacon may refer to:

- Daniel S. Bacon (1798–1866), American politician and judge
- Daniel Bacon (footballer) (born 1980), English footballer
- Danny Bacon (born 1980), English footballer
- Danny Bacon, character played by Takayuki Sugō
- Daniel Bacon (voice actor) in The BFG (2016 film)
- Daniel Bacon, see Aurora Teagarden
