= Senator Bacon =

Senator Bacon may refer to:

- Augustus Octavius Bacon (1839–1914), U.S. Senator from Georgia
- Bob Bacon (born 1935), Colorado State Senate
- Gaspar G. Bacon (1886–1947), Massachusetts State Senate
- John Bacon (Massachusetts politician) (1738–1820), Massachusetts State Senate
- Kevin Bacon (politician) (born 1971), Ohio State Senate
- Orrin Bacon (1820–1893), Wisconsin State Senate
- Robert Bacon (Iowa politician) (born 1955), Iowa State Senate
