= Charlotte Bacon =

Charlotte Bacon may refer to:

- Lady Charlotte Bacon (1801–1880), English aristocrat
- Charlotte Bacon (physician) (1884–1976), British medical missionary
- Charlotte Bacon (author) (born 1965), American author and professor of English
- Charlotte Bacon (2006–2012), victim in the Sandy Hook Elementary School shooting
- Charlotte Bacon, wife of homeopath George Napoleon Epps
