= Charles Bacon (disambiguation) =

Charles Bacon (1885–1968) was an American athlete.

Charles Bacon may also refer to:

- Charles Bacon (sculptor) (1821–1886), English sculptor
- Charles R. Bacon, late 20th-century American geologist
