= General Bacon =

General Bacon may refer to:

- Anthony Bacon (British Army officer) (1796–1864), British Army major general
- Don Bacon (born 1963), U.S. Air Force brigadier general
- John M. Bacon (1844–1913), U.S. Volunteers brigadier general
