= Evan Bacon =

American artist and child prodigy

- Occupation: Software Developer at SpaceXAI
- Years active: 2011–present
- Known for: Lego Artist
- Website: evanbacon.dev

Evan Bacon (born 3 July 1997) is an American LEGO-artist and software developer, best known for his life-sized LEGO sculptures and his work at React Native Expo, where he served as engineering manager of developer tools.

== Lego artistry ==
His artistic debut came in 2011, when he displayed a life-sized LEGO Batman sculpture at Brick Fiesta for Adam West. His Batman sculpture was awarded "Best Artistic", "Best Youth Creation", and "People's Choice Award" at Brick Fiesta 2011. Following the initial success, Evan went on to construct LEGO sculptures full-time; building Iron Man, Superman, and Captain Kirk.

Evan was awarded a Best of Austin award from The Austin Chronicle for his Breast Cancer awareness model.

In 2013 Evan turned his attention to the video game industry, collaborating with Rooster Teeth he built a Life-Size LEGO Minion from Despicable Me at RTX.

== Software development career ==
Bacon began his career in technology as a Visual Design Intern at Frog Design in 2015, subsequently advancing to the role of Design Technologist. While at Frog Design, he utilized Expo and React Native for client project development. In October 2017, he joined Expo as a software programmer, where his primary responsibilities included the development of Expo's web platform and CLI tools. His role evolved to engineering manager in January 2022, overseeing the developer tools division at Expo. His work includes the development of Expo Router and contributions to cross-platform mobile development infrastructure.

Bacon, who received his education through homeschooling, established his presence in the Expo community through social media engagement and application development, which preceded his employment at the company. His technical presentations include appearances at React Europe and App.js conf, where he introduced Expo's web platform. In July 2026, Bacon announced he joined SpaceXAI as an engineer.

=== Awards and nominations ===
Year	Award	Nominated work	Result
2011	LEGO Brick Fiesta People's Choice Award for Best Exhibition	LEGO Batman Sculpture	Won
2011	LEGO Brick Fiesta Best Artistic Exhibition	LEGO Batman Sculpture	Won
2011	LEGO Brick Fiesta Best Youth Exhibition	LEGO Batman Sculpture	Won
2012	LEGO Brick Fiesta People's Choice Award for Best Exhibition	LEGO Iron Man Sculpture	Won
2012	LEGO Brick Fiesta Best Artistic Exhibition	LEGO Iron Man Sculpture	Nominated
2013	The Austin Chronicle Best of Austin: Best Big Lego Builder	LEGO Susan G. Komen Breast Cancer awareness Sculpture	Won
