= Bradford Beach =

Public Beach in Milwaukee, Wisconsin

- Beach
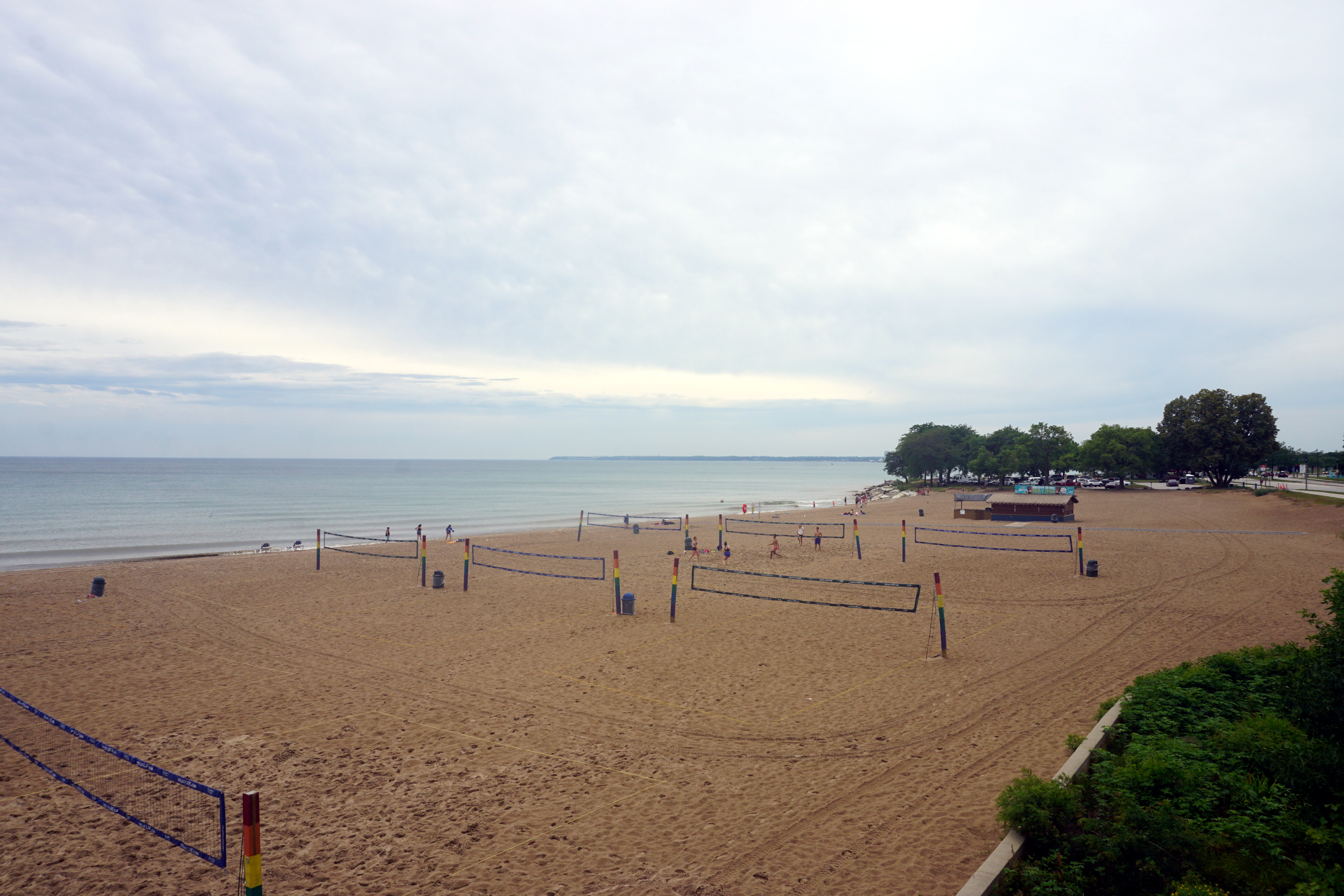

- Coordinates: 43.061667°N 87.873056°W
- Location: Milwaukee, Wisconsin
- Part of: Lake Park, Milwaukee Historic park
- Offshore water bodies: Lake Michigan
- Age: Approximately 100 years old

Area
  - Total: 28.3 hectares (70 acres)

Dimensions
  - Length: 1.94 km (1.21 mi)
- Elevation: 3.1 m (10 ft)
- Website: bradfordbeachmke.com

Bradford Beach is a public beach in Milwaukee, Wisconsin, United States. The beach which was constructed in the 1920s is part of Lake Park; a mile (1.6 km)-long park on a bluff above Lake Michigan. Lake Park was listed on the National Register of Historic Places on April 22, 1993.

== Design ==
Bradford Beach falls within Lake Park which was designed in the late 19th century by landscape architect Frederick Law Olmsted, who also designed Central Park in New York City.

The beach is wheelchair accessible. In 2021 the rising water of Lake Michigan has shrunk the width of the beach.

== History ==
In the 1920s, the beach was created by filling in swampy areas near Lake Michigan. It has been Milwaukee's most popular beach. On the beach near the road, there is a historic bathhouse. The Bathhouse was built in 1949 and includes a walkway above Lincoln Memorial Drive. The Wisconsin Historical Society surveyed it in 2011.

One local resident who patronized the beach was a man named Dick Bacon. Bacon was known to work on his sun tan in the middle of winter at Bradford Beach.

== See also ==
- Parks of Milwaukee
- East Side, Milwaukee
