= Little Chelsea =

Hamlet in London, England

Coordinates: 51.4847°N 0.1785°W

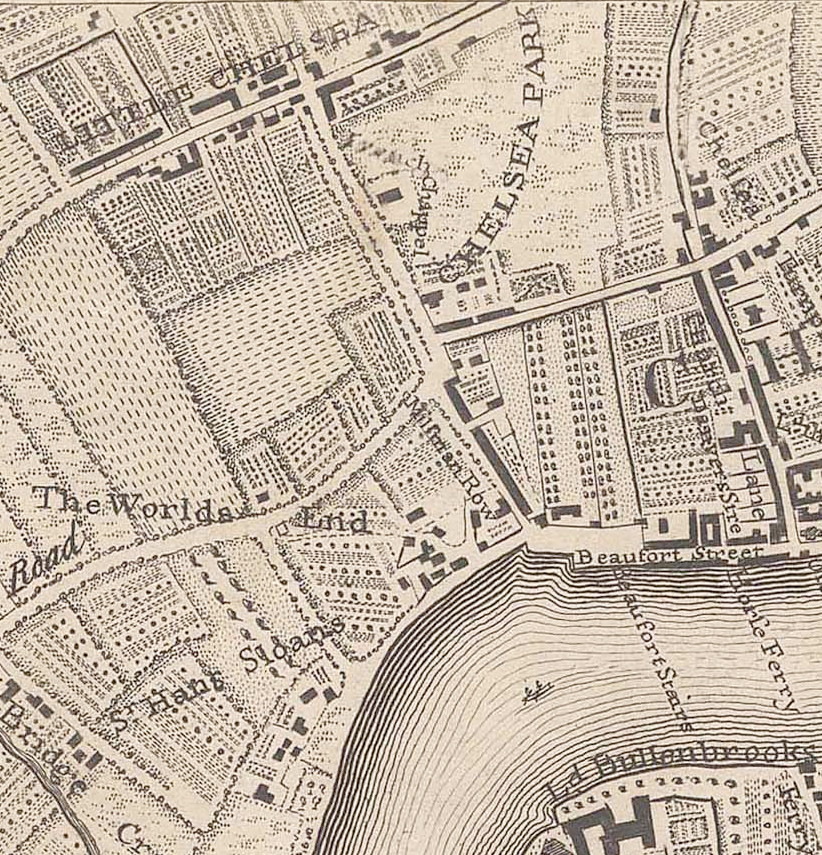
The hamlet of Little Chelsea (top left), along the Fulham Road, in John Rocque's 1746 map of London.

Little Chelsea was a hamlet, located on either side of Fulham Road, half a mile southwest of Chelsea, London. The earliest references to the settlement date from the early 17th century, and the name continued to be used until the hamlet was surrounded by residential developments in the late 19th century.

== History ==
Evidence of a settlement known by this name appears in the Kensington parish burial record for a child in 1617 and magistrates accounts of an alehouse run by Thomas Freeman in 1625. By the 1670s, the Hearth tax lists 23 buildings, of various size and quality, and the section of Fulham Road that ran through the hamlet was known as 'Little Chelsey streete'. A school was operating in 1703, and, by 1737 there were two public houses in Fulham Road, including the 'Coach and Horses' near Park Walk.

In 1811, the area's mixed character remained with:

"... weather-boarded cottages, shops, builders' premises and schools in this part of Fulham Road, but also houses occupied by wealthy retired tradesmen, rentiers and office-holders, with poplars blowing in their front gardens and the orchards and nursery-grounds of south-west Brompton behind them."

In his memoirs, journalist William Jerdan recalled his time in Little Chelsea in the early 19th century. One of his near neighbours, living 'on a very moderate scale', was the 'exiled Princess of Condé'. The Princess, Louise Adélaïde de Bourbon, lived in a cottage owned by M. Amyot, in 1815-16. Jerdan reports that she often had visits from Marie Thérèse of France, then Duchess of Angoulême, daughter of the executed Louis XVI, and he described seeing Marie Thérèse in the street 'dressed little better than a milkmaid, which rank indeed she resembled in her form, and walking about in thick-soled boots'.

In 1868, the National Gazetteer of Great Britain and Ireland places 'St. George's workhouse, formerly the residence of the earls of Shaftesbury; Chelsea Park, the Pavilion, and the Goat in Boots inn, the sign of which was originally painted by Moreland' within the bounds of Little Chelsea.

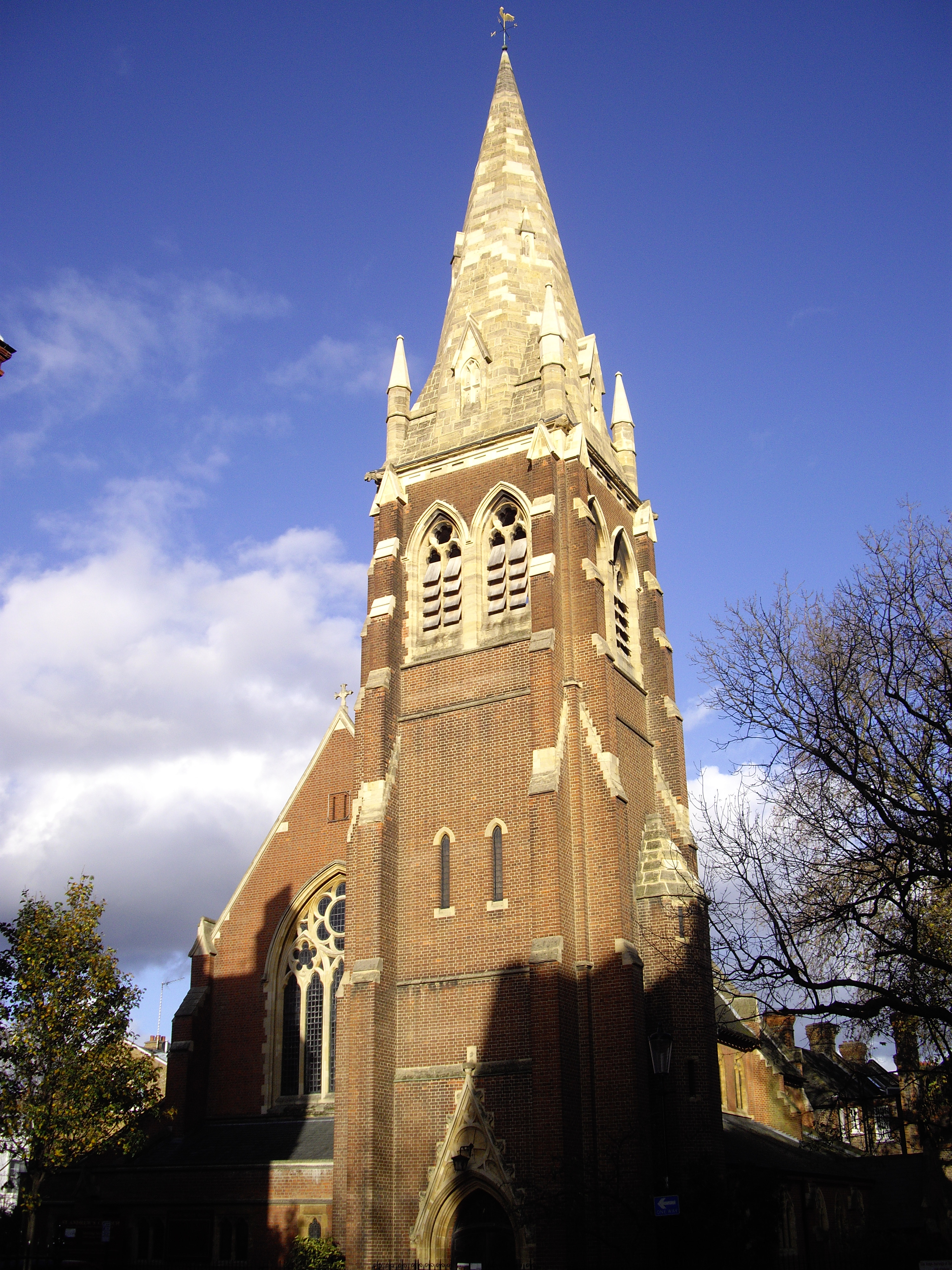
Present-day St Andrew's Church in Park Walk, Chelsea, is built on the site of Park Chapel, the local place of worship for Little Chelsea from 1718.

=== Shaftesbury House ===
In 1699, the Earl of Shaftesbury purchased a property known as 'Sir James Smith's House' in Little Chelsea, which was reported to have built by Smith in 1635. Shaftesbury added 50 foot extension into the garden to house his bedchamber and Library. In the garden itself, the Earl planted fruit trees, and 'every kind of vine'. The property was sold to Narcissus Luttrell in 1710. The parish of St George Hanover Square became owners in 1787 and converted the house and grounds into an additional workhouse for their parish poor.

=== Chelsea Park and Chapel ===
In the 1680s, 40 acres of farmland adjoining Fulham Road was enclosed by a wall and became known as Chelsea Park. As land on the Park's western side began to be built on, a dividing roadway was established which was 'lined with elms and called Twopenny Walk' (now Park Walk). In 1718, John Appletree established the Raw Silk Company which paid £200 for a 61-year lease of the Park. A large silkworm nursery was built and 2000 mulberry trees planted. In 1723, the company was able to produce satin for Caroline of Ansbach, Princess of Wales, however, the removal of the tax on imported silk, two years earlier, had led to financial difficulties and the business closed. Raw Silk Company shareholder Richard Manningham took over the lease in 1724, but had some rights to the land in 1718, which allowed him to build Park Chapel, in Twopenny Walk, as a local church for Little Chelsea residents.

Manningham's Park Chapel was a simple, single storey building, with a roof turret that housed one bell. In 1810, the Chapel was enlarged to seat a congregation of 1200. By the 1830s, the Chapel had associated subscription schools, in new buildings in its grounds. The National School for boys had 150 pupils and the Chelsea National, for girls, had eighty. The Chapel was renamed Emmanuel in 1906/7 and demolished in 1912. The chapel land, owned by Cyril Sloane Stanley was donated to the parish, and Charles Bannister paid for the construction of a new church on the site, St. Andrew's, which opened in 1913. Four houses in Park Walk, to the north of the new Church, were donated by congregation member Miss Birch, including the present vicarage.

== Notable residents ==
- Montagu Bacon - spent time in 'Duffield's madhouse' before his death in 1749.
- Charles Boyle, 4th Earl of Orrery - born at Little Chelsea in 1674.
- Anthony Ashley-Cooper, 3rd Earl of Shaftesbury - built Shaftesbury House in 1699, sold in 1710.
- George Robert Gray - born at Little Chelsea in 1808.
- Adrian Hardy Haworth - resident in Little Chelsea from 1792 to 1812 and 1817 until his death in 1833.
- Narcissus Luttrell - bought Shaftesbury House in 1710, died in Little Chelsea in 1732.
- Mary Robinson (poet) - taught at her mother's school in Little Chelsea from 1771.
- Edward Wynne (jurist) - inherited Shaftesbury House and died there in 1784.
