= Alice Bacon =

Alice Bacon may refer to:

- Alice Bacon, Baroness Bacon (1909–1993), British politician
- Alice Mabel Bacon (1858–1918), American author
