= Kevin Bacon (disambiguation) =

Kevin Bacon (born 1958) is an American film and theater actor and musician.

Kevin Bacon may also refer to:

- Kevin Bacon (producer) (born 1959), English musical producer, also the bassist of the band Comsat Angels
- Kevin Bacon (politician) (born 1971), state representative of the US state of Ohio
- Kevin Bacon (equestrian) (1932–2020), Australian Olympic equestrian
