= Ernie Bacon =

English footballer (1896–1972)

Personal information
- Full name: Ernest Frederick Bacon
- Date of birth: 19 February 1896
- Place of birth: Leicester, England
- Date of death: 9 January 1972 (aged 75)
- Place of death: Aylestone, England
- Positions: Right half; utility player

Youth career
- Oxford Street
- St Andrew's

Senior career*
Years	Team	Apps	(Gls)
1919–1920	Leicester City	4	(0)
1920–1921	Watford	12	(0)
1921–1923	Charlton Athletic	5	(0)
1923	Nuneaton Town	4	(1)
1923–1924	Kettering Town		
1924–1926	Barwell United		
1927–1928	Rothwell Town		
1928–1929	Erith & Belvedere		
- Callendar Athletic

International career
- England Schoolboys
- * Club domestic league appearances and goals

Ernest Frederick Bacon (19 February 1896 – 9 January 1972) was an English professional footballer who played in the Football League for Watford, Charlton Athletic and Leicester City as a right half.

== Personal life ==
Bacon served in the Royal Garrison Artillery in Salonika during the First World War.

== Career statistics ==
Appearances and goals by club, season and competition
Club	Season	League			FA Cup		Other		Total	
Club	Season	Division	Apps	Goals	Apps	Goals	Apps	Goals	Apps	Goals
Leicester City	1919–20	Second Division	4	0	0	0	―		4	0
Watford	1920–21	Third Division	12	0	0	0	―		12	0
Charlton Athletic	1921–22	Third Division South	3	0	0	0	―		3	0
Charlton Athletic	1922–23	Third Division South	2	0	0	0	―		2	0
Charlton Athletic	Total		5	0	0	0	―		5	0
Nuneaton Town	1923–24	Birmingham & District League	4	1	0	0	2 (Note: 1 appearance in Birmingham Senior Cup, 1 appearance in Nuneaton Charity Cup)	0	6	1
Career total			24	0	0	0	2	0	26	1
