= Tim Bacon =

British actor

- Born: Timothy Alan Bacon; 24 March 1964; Romford, Essex, England
- Died: 30 April 2016 (aged 52)
- Other name: Alan
- Occupation: Restaurateur

Timothy Alan Bacon (24 March 1964 – 30 April 2016) was a British restaurateur and actor, most known for creating the Living Ventures group of restaurants.

== Biography ==
Bacon grew up in Tasmania, Australia. His acting career comprised starring in 25 episodes of Australian soap opera Sons and Daughters; Bacon played Chris Bainbridge, the son of a Vietnam veteran. In 1987, Bacon moved to London, where he worked in TGI Fridays in Covent Garden. He then decided to become a professional bartender, forming his own company, Bar Biz. In 1989, Bacon appeared on Richard & Judy and Wogan; the latter appearance helped him get a job in Manchester, and in 1991, he met his long term business partner Jeremy Roberts and helped open the Chalon Court Hotel in Lancashire. In 1993, Bacon and his friend David Hinds bought the JW Johnsons bar in Manchester, a popular bar restaurant and club; this led to the later development of Via Vita, a Mediterranean-style bar-restaurant, developed with Roberts and Hinds which was sold in 1998.

In 1999, Bacon set up the Living Room with Jeremy Roberts and developed the business to 13 restaurants; there were 34 restaurants in the group when Bacon and Roberts sold the Living Room to trade in 2007. In 2005, the Est Est Est restaurant business was acquired, which in 2016 had 15 restaurants, Between 2010 and 2012 the business grew adding the Oast House (which grew into the New World Trading Company), the Alchemist, Australasia and Artisan - all developed in Manchester City Centre. In 2013, the Manchester House restaurant was opened, with the aim of it becoming the first Michelin star restaurant in Manchester. In 2015, the Group led by Bacon had a turnover in excess of £100 million, and was awarded the Manchester Evening News Business of the Year award.

Bacon was married three times, and had three children.

== Death ==
In 1999/2000, Bacon was diagnosed with lymphoma, and in 2014, he was diagnosed with advanced melanoma. He died on 30 April 2016. A memorial service was held for Bacon on 16 May, and there were discussions of creating a permanent memorial for him in Manchester city centre. Bacon's 12-year-old nephew Jett died of Ewing's sarcoma five days after.
