= Ed Bacon =

Ed Bacon may refer to:

- Ed Bacon (Episcopal priest) (born 1948), American priest in the Diocese of Los Angeles
- Ed Bacon (architect) (1910–2005), American urban planner, architect, educator and author

== See also ==
- Edward Bacon (disambiguation)
- Edmund Bacon (disambiguation)
- Edgar Bacon (disambiguation)
- Edwin Bacon (disambiguation)
