= Anthony Bacon =

Anthony Bacon may refer to:

- Anthony Bacon (1558–1601), member of the English Bacon family and spy during the Elizabethan era
- Anthony Bacon (industrialist) (1717–1786), English-born industrialist
- Anthony Bushby Bacon (1772–1827), industrialist, landed gentleman (and illegitimate son of the above)
- Anthony Bacon (British Army officer) (1796–1864), cavalry officer and commander in the Napoleonic wars (and son of the above)

== See also ==
- Tony Bacon, Table football player
