= Leonard Bacon (disambiguation) =

Leonard Bacon (1802–1881) was an American Congregational preacher and writer.

Leonard Bacon may also refer to:

- Leonard Bacon (poet) (1887–1954), American poet and literary critic; great-grandson of Rev. Leonard Bacon
- Leonard Woolsey Bacon (1830–1907), American clergyman; son of Rev. Leonard Bacon
