= George Bacon =

George Bacon may refer to:

- George Bacon (physicist) (1917–2011), British nuclear physicist
- George Bacon (CIA officer) (1946–1976), American soldier
- George B. Bacon (1836–1876), American clergyman and author
- George Washington Bacon (1830–1922), American mapmaker and publisher
- George Bacon (cricketer) (born 1992), English cricketer
