= Walter Bacon =

Walter Bacon may refer to:

- Walter Rathbone Bacon (1845–1917), American tramway executive
- Walter W. Bacon (1880–1962), American politician from Delaware
