= Thomas Bacon =

Thomas Bacon may refer to:

- Thomas Bacon (academic) (died 1559), master of the then Gonville College, Cambridge
- Thomas Sclater later Bacon (died 1736), MP
- Thomas Bacon (politician) (c. 1620–1697), English Member of Parliament
- Thomas Bacon (judge) (fl. 1336), English justice
- Thomas Bacon (priest) (1711–1768), clergyman, musician, author and publisher in Ireland, England and Maryland
- Thomas M. Bacon (1803–1874), American politician
- Thomas Rutherford Bacon (1850–1913), American clergyman and professor of history
- Tom Bacon (born 1993), British speedway rider
- Thomas Bacon (musician), 18th century musician from Annapolis, USA
