= Roger Bacon (disambiguation) =

Roger Bacon (c. 1219/20–c. 1292) was an English polymath, philosopher and friar.

Roger Bacon may also refer to:

- Sir Roger Sewell Bacon (1895–1962), British judge and chief justice of Gibraltar
- Roger Stuart Bacon (1926–2021), Canadian politician, premier of Nova Scotia
- Roger Bacon (physicist) (1926–2007), American physicist
