= Paul Bacon =

Paul Bacon may refer to:

- Paul Bacon (designer) (1923–2015), American graphic designer
- Paul Bacon (footballer) (born 1970), English footballer
- Paul Bacon (politician) (1907–1999), French politician
