= Lee Bacon =

American children's author

- Born: September 5, 1979 (age 46); Abilene, Texas, United States
- Education: Texas A&M University (bachelor’s); Pace University (master’s)
- Occupation: Author
- Writing career
- Period: 2012–present
- Genre: Children's literature robot
- Notable works: Joshua Dread; Joshua Dread: The Nameless Hero; Joshua Dread: Banjour
- Website: leebaconbooks.com

Lee Bacon (born September 5, 1979) is an American writer of the children's books series Joshua Dread (2012), Joshua Dread: The Nameless Hero (2013), and Joshua Dread: The Dominion Key (2014), all published by Random House.

== Biography ==
Lee Bacon grew up in Texas. He attended the master's program in book publishing at Pace University. He then spent two years living in Munich, Germany, where he started writing children's books and where he met his wife. He lived in Brooklyn, New York, moved to New Jersey in 2016 and now lives in Munich with his wife and 2 daughters.

== Books ==
Bacon's Joshua Dread series was selected for the Spirit of Texas Reading Program by the Texas Library Association.

Joshua Dread has been translated into German (Joshua Schreck) by Uwe-Michael Gutzschhahn, French (Jack Vandal) by Amélie Sarn and Spanish (La alucinante vida ¿normal? de Lucas D.) by Marc Viaplana.

A new middle-grade series called Legendtopia was scheduled to be published by Random House in 2016.

Bacon's book The Last Human was released in October 2019. The book is set to be adapted into a film by Phil Lord and Chris Miller, who will produce and direct the film for TriStar Pictures. Shazam! writer Henry Gayden will write the screenplay.

== Bibliography ==
- Joshua Dread (2012)
- Joshua Dread: The Nameless Hero (2013)
- Joshua Dread: The Dominion Key (2014)
- Legendtopia: The Battle for Urth (2016)
- Legendtopia: The Shadow Queen (2017)
- The Last Human (2019)
- Interview With The Robot (2020)
- Imaginary (2021)
- The Fall Of The Robots (2024)
