= W. Meredith Bacon =

American political scientist and LGBTQ rights activist

W. Meredith Bacon (June 30 1946 – February 8 2026) was an American political science professor and LGBT-rights activist. When she changed her name and transitioned to female in 2005, she retained the "W" as a first initial that was changed to stand for nothing and retained her lifelong middle name, Meredith.

A specialist in international relations, particularly politics in Romania and Moldova, Bacon taught political science at the University of Nebraska at Omaha (UNO) for 38 years. She served three nonconsecutive terms as President of the Faculty Senate, the first two before her transition and the third after her transition. She was the first known transgender professor at UNO and may be the first openly transgender person elected to a university faculty leadership position in the United States.

== Early life, career and death ==
Bacon was raised in Upper East Side Manhattan, New York City. She knew she was transgender by the age of four, but struggled with feelings of shame. At an all-boy Episcopalian boarding school in Connecticut, she became active in theatre and willingly took female roles on stage. It was not until reading the book The Transsexual Phenomenon in 1964 that Bacon had a name for her identity.

Bacon met Lynne Lazier in 1964, while both were students at Colorado College, and they married in 1968. In 1972, Bacon told Lynne she was "not a man but a woman." The couple remained together until Lynne died in 2018, shortly after their 50th wedding anniversary. Upon moving to Omaha, they built their careers in the collegiate environments and maintain an affectionate, not sexual, relationship. The couple were long-time members of All Saints Episcopal Church in Omaha, where Lynne served as deacon.

Bacon earned a Ph.D. from the University of Denver in 1976. That same year, she was hired by UNO as a professor of Soviet politics. After publishing criticism of Nikolai Ceausescu, Bacon was declared persona non grata in Romania from 1980 until 1989.

Bacon died on February 8 2026, at the age of 79.

== Transition ==
In the late 1990s, Bacon was officially diagnosed with Gender Identity Disorder. In 2005, she transitioned from male to female. Bacon made her transition public, announcing it at her workplace, at her spouse's workplace, to everyone on their Christmas card list, in the Omaha World-Herald newspaper, television news, and People magazine.

== Activism ==
Bacon, a Democrat, has been involved with the Nebraska AIDS Project and the National Center for Transgender Equality. She has advocated for LGBTQ rights at the local, state, and national levels.

Since 2015, the University of Nebraska Omaha awards the "Dr. Meredith Bacon Lavender Maverick" award, named after her, to graduates "with an outstanding history of contributions to the UNO LGBTQIA+ campus community."
