= Michael Bacon =

Michael Bacon may refer to:

- Michael Bacon (composer) (born 1949), American musician/composer who is part of the musical group The Bacon Brothers
- Michael Bacon (artist) (born 1968), American video game artist/producer/developer
- Michael Bacon (fencer), American fencer
