= Robert Bacon House =

Historic house in Massachusetts, United States

- U.S. National Register of Historic Places
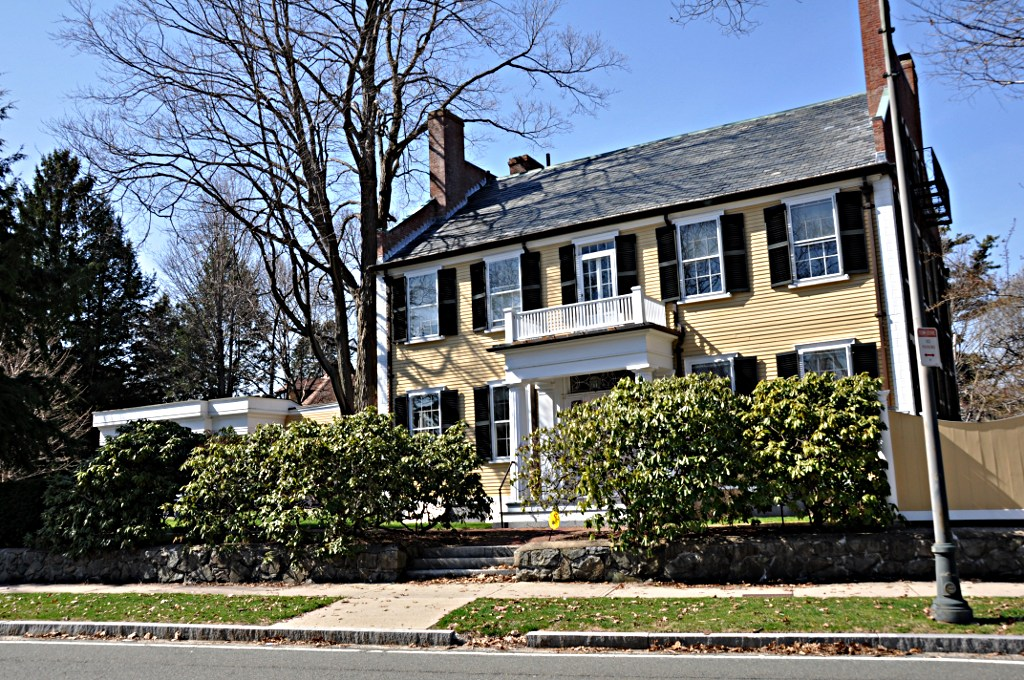

- Location within Massachusetts Location within the United States
- Location: 6 Mystic Valley Parkway, Winchester, Massachusetts
- Coordinates: 42°26′36″N 71°8′34″W
- Area: less than one acre
- Built: 1830
- Architect: John Kutts
- Architectural style: Greek Revival, Federal
- MPS: Winchester MRA
- NRHP reference No.: 89000611
- Added to NRHP: July 5, 1989

The Robert Bacon House is a historic house at 6 Mystic Valley Parkway in Winchester, Massachusetts. Built about 1830, it is one of the town's only surviving examples of high-style transitional Federal/Greek Revival styling. It was built for a local businessman whose nearby mills (no longer surviving) were major employers of the period. The house was listed on the National Register of Historic Places in 1989.

== Description and history ==
The Robert Bacon House stands in southern Winchester, on the west side of Mystic Valley Parkway near the point where the Aberjona River empties into the Upper Mystic Lake. It is a 2 1/2-story wood-frame structure, with a side-gable roof and clapboarded front and back. The side walls are built out of brick, rising to a parapet and two end chimneys. Its front facade is five bays wide and symmetrical, with the center entrance sheltered by a portico supported by fluted Doric columns and topped by a balustrade. The entry is framed by sidelight and transom windows with tracery. The interior also retains high quality wood work from its period of construction.

The house was built about 1830 to a design by John Kutts, a prominent Boston-based architect. The house is of particular note because its original architectural drawings survive, as do contractor bills and other documents related to its construction. It was built for Robert Bacon, who had been using the water privilege on the Aberjona River since 1824 for the manufacture of felt hats. He purchased the land on the west side of the river in 1825, and had this house placed with a view toward his mill and worker village. The mills supposedly burned down in 1843, but were rebuilt and leased to other industrial operations by the Bacons. Winchester's Bacon Street is named for him, and the area of the mill village was known for many years as Baconville.

== See also ==
- National Register of Historic Places listings in Winchester, Massachusetts
