= Clarrie Bacon =

English footballer

Personal information
- Full name: Clarence George Bacon
- Date of birth: 9 November 1889
- Place of birth: Grimsby, England
- Date of death: 6 November 1954 (aged 64)
- Position: Winger

Senior career*
Years	Team	Apps	(Gls)
1906–1907	Haycroft Rovers		
1907–1908	Grimsby Rangers		
1908–1912	Grimsby Town	11	(0)
1912–1913	Cleethorpes Town		
1913	Doncaster Rovers		
1913–1914	Goole Town		
1914–19??	North Shields Athletic		
- * Club domestic league appearances and goals

Clarence George "Clarrie" Bacon (9 November 1889 – 6 November 1954) was an English professional footballer who played as a winger.
