= Justice Bacon =

Justice Bacon may refer to:

- Nathaniel Bacon (Michigan jurist) (1802–1869), associate justice of the Michigan Supreme Court
- William J. Bacon (1803–1889), ex officio a judge of the New York Court of Appeals

== See also ==
- Judge Bacon (disambiguation)
