= Frank Bacon =

Frank Bacon may refer to:

- Frank Bacon (actor) (1864–1922), American character actor and playwright
- Frank Bacon (football manager) (1862–1917), director and temporary manager of Bristol City F.C.
- Frank L. Bacon (1841–1917), member of the Wisconsin State Assembly
- Francis Bacon (American football) (1894–1977), known as Frank, NFL player in the early 1920s

== See also ==
- Francis Bacon (disambiguation)
