= Philemon Bacon =

Philemon Bacon (died 1 June 1666) was a captain in the Royal Navy, was made a lieutenant in 1661, and in 1664 was advanced to be captain of the Nonsuch. In 1665 he commanded the Oxford, a ship of the fifth rate, in the Battle of Lowestoft on 3 June with the Dutch off Lowestoft. The following year he was in the Bristol, and led the van when the English and Dutch fleets engaged off the North Foreland at the St. James's Day Battle on 1 June. Bacon died early in the battle.
