= Brick Fiesta =

Annual Lego convention in Texas

- Status: Active
- Genre: LEGO
- Venue: The Renaissance Austin Hotel
- Location: (Texas) Austin
- Country: United States
- Inaugurated: 2011; 15 years ago
- Organizer: TexLUG
- Website: www.brickfiesta.com

Brick Fiesta or BrickFiesta is a Lego convention and exhibition held yearly in Texas, United States. It was first held in 2011 in Austin, Texas. It is a four-day event, operating generally Thursday through Sunday, and is typically held during late June or early July. The convention displays LEGO models, displays, and trains covering up to 35,000 square feet of convention space. In 2011, several thousand attendees filled the convention throughout its public hours.

In November 2020, Brick Fiesta was rebranded as Brick Rodeo.

== History and organization ==
Brick Fiesta is a non-profit, fan-run, family friendly annual LEGO fan convention. Unlike other LEGO fan conventions, Brick Fiesta moves each year, among four major Texas cities: Austin, Houston, Dallas, & San Antonio. The first Brick Fiesta convention was held as a four-day convention in 2011 at the Omni Southpark hotel in Austin.

== Private convention ==
The function of the Private Convention is to provide a venue for adult fans of LEGO to bring and display their own Lego creations. The event brings together the online fan community and helps fans to explore and develop their Lego hobby. Activities at the convention include presentations, classes, contests, games, and many experiences unique to Lego conventions.

== Public exhibition ==
The main focus of the Public Exhibition is to invite Lego fans of all ages and the general public to view hundreds of hobbyist-built creations and meet their creators. Also available to visitors are the vendors, who sell LEGO sets, creations, designs, and individual pieces.

== Locations and dates ==
| Dates | Location | Registrants | Attendance |
|---|---|---|---|
| July 23–26, 2020 | Virtual Event held via Zoom due to the COVID pandemic | | |
| July 4–7, 2019 | Renaissance Austin Hotel, Austin, Texas | | |
| July 5–8, 2018 | El Tropicano Riverwalk Hotel, San Antonio, Texas | | |
| June 29 - July 2, 2017 | Hampton Inn, Mesquite, Texas | | |
| July 7–10, 2016 | Westin Galleria, Houston, Texas | ~200 | ~3000 |
| July 23–26, 2015 | Doubletree, Austin, Texas | ~200 | ~5000 |
| July 3–6, 2014 | DoubleTree (San Antonio Airport), San Antonio, Texas | ~175 | |
| July 4–7, 2013 | Hampton Inn, Mesquite, Texas | ~400 | ~4500 |
| July 4–8, 2012 | Westin Galleria, Houston, Texas | ~300 | ~4000 |
| June 30 - July 3, 2011 | Omni Southpark, Austin, Texas | ~100 | |
