= Edwin Bacon =

Edwin Bacon may refer to:

- Edwin Bacon (priest) (born 1948)
- Edwin Munroe Bacon (1844–1916), American writer and editor

== See also ==
- Ed Bacon (disambiguation)
