= John Bacon (cricketer) =

English cricketer

Personal information
- Full name: John Bacon
- Born: 30 May 1871; Enderby, Leicestershire, England
- Died: 16 October 1942 (aged 71); Broughton Astley, Leicestershire, England
- Batting: Right-handed
- Bowling: Right-arm medium

Domestic team information
- Years: Team
- 1900–1904: Cambridgeshire
- 1895: Leicestershire

Umpiring information
- FC umpired: 1 (1904)

Career statistics
Competition	First-class
Matches	4
Runs scored	42
Batting average	6.00
100s/50s	–/–
Top score	14
Balls bowled	55
Wickets	1
Bowling average	21.00
5 wickets in innings	–
10 wickets in match	–
Best bowling	1/18
Catches/stumpings	–/–
- Source: Cricinfo, 26 January 2013

John Bacon (30 May 1871 – 16 October 1942) was an English cricketer. Bacon was a right-handed batsman who bowled right-arm medium pace. He was born at Enderby, Leicestershire.

Bacon made his first-class debut for Leicestershire against Essex in the 1895 County Championship at Grace Road. He made three further first-class appearances for the county in that season's County Championship, against Derbyshire, Hampshire and Lancashire. He scored 42 runs in his four first-class matches, at an average of 6.00 and with a high score of 14. With the ball he took a single wicket. He later played for Cambridgeshire, making his debut for the county in the 1900 Minor Counties Championship against Northumberland. He made eleven further minor counties appearances for Cambridgeshire, the last of which came against Norfolk in the 1904 Minor Counties Championship.

He later stood as an umpire in a single first-class match in 1904 between Cambridge University and GJV Weigall's XI. He died at Broughton Astley, Leicestershire on 16 October 1942.
