= Jeff Bacon =

Australian manufacturer and politician

Jeff Bacon is an Australian firearms manufacturer and politician, based in Tamworth, New South Wales.

== History ==
Bacon is managing director of Oceania Precision, a Tamworth-based manufacturer of several models of straight pull semi-automatic rifles.

Weapons manufactured by his company includes the SP15, described as an M4-style select fire weapon "built specifically for law enforcement", firing .223 Remington / 5.56 x 45 NATO cartridges. It is a prohibited weapon in New South Wales, its state of origin.

== Politics ==
Bacon was a member of the Shooters, Fishers and Farmers Party and their candidate for the upper house seat of Tamworth in the 2019 state election. He subsequently joined the Nationals, but defected to One Nation. In October 2026 the party announced he would be their second candidate for the upper house at the state election due in March 2027.
