= Chris Bacon =

Chris Bacon may refer to:

- Chris Bacon (boxer) (born 1969), Australian boxer
- Chris Bacon (composer) (born 1977), American composer
