= Edgar Mayhew Bacon =

Edgar Mayhew Bacon (5 June 1855 – 14 December 1935) was an American author and artist.

Bacon was born in Nassau, Bahamas on 5 June 1855, where his father was vice-consul and grandfather, John F. Bacon, was U.S. consul. He later moved to Tarrytown on Hudson, New York State in the United States and became an artist.
