= Edward Bacon =

Edward Bacon may refer to:

- Edward Bacon (died 1618), High Sheriff of Suffolk, British Member of Parliament for Great Yarmouth, Tavistock, Weymouth and Melcombe Regis, and Suffolk
- Edward A. Bacon (1897–1968), American businessman and Republican politician
- Edward Denny Bacon (1860–1938), British entrepreneur and philatelist
- Edward Bacon (died 1786), British Member of Parliament for Callington, Newport, King's Lynn and Norwich
- Edward Woolsey Bacon (1843–1887), American sailor and clergyman
- Edward R. Bacon (1848–1915), American railroad executive, lawyer and financier

== See also ==
- Ed Bacon (disambiguation)
- Edgar Bacon (disambiguation)
