= Montagu Bacon =

Montagu Bacon (1688–1749) was an English scholar and critic.

== Life ==
Bacon was the second of the three sons of Nicholas Bacon, son and heir of Nicholas Bacon, of Shrubland Hall, Barham, Suffolk. Paternally he was descended from Sir Nicholas Baker; and maternally from the Earl of Sandwich. His mother was the Lady Catherine Montagu, youngest daughter of Edward Montagu, 1st Earl of Sandwich.

Bacon was born at Coddenham, and educated at Westminster School. He entered the Middle Temple in 1704. He was admitted a fellow-commoner of Trinity College, Cambridge, in 1704–5, but seems not to have taken a degree until 1734, when he proceeded Master of Arts. Before then he had resided in Leicestershire.

In 1743 Bacon was presented by the University of Cambridge, in whose gift it then was, in consequence of the disability of the proper patron, Edward Howard, 9th Duke of Norfolk, to the rectory of Newbold Verdon. He then suffered a breakdown, but was permitted to retain the rectory till his death, which happened at Chelsea, 7 April 1749. He was buried at Coddenham on the 19th of the same month. A "note" by Thomas Martyn, botany professor at Cambridge, records the circumstance that Montagu Bacon's last lodgings were in Manor Street, Chelsea, "before which he had been in Duffield's madhouse at Little Chelsea, where he was attended by his [Martyn's] father. . . . Mr. Bacon always appeared as a layman. ... I never apprehended that he was in orders".

== Works ==
Bacon told Zachary Grey that "not many English or foreign poets had escaped him". His own literary work was in a volume published after his death, Critical, Historical, and Explanatory Notes upon Hudibras, by way of Supplement to the two Editions published in the years 1744 and 1745, by Zachary Grey, LL.D. To which is prefixed a Dissertation upon Burlesque Poetry by the late learned and ingenious Montagu Bacon, Esq. And an Appendix, in which is a Translation of Part of the first Canto into Latin Doggrel, London, 1752.
