= Charlotte Bacon (physician) =

British medical missionary (1884 – 1976)

- Born: Charlotte Bailey; April 18, 1884; South Wales
- Died: 5 October 1976 (aged 92); Hindhead, England
- Other names: Peh-Si-Nai
- Education: University of Birmingham (MB ChB), 1908
- Spouse: John Lionel Bacon
- Medical career
- Profession: Medical missionary
- Institutions: Birmingham Children's Hospital; Church Mission Society; Way of Life Hospital; Tung Wah Hospital
- Sub-specialties: Tropical disease; Pediatrics

Charlotte Bacon (née Bailey; 18 April 1884 – 15 October 1976) was a British medical missionary and author. She was one of the first women admitted to the University of Birmingham and the first woman doctor of Birmingham Children's Hospital.

She worked for over 35 years in China as a medical officer with the Church Mission Society and helped build and run the Way of Life Hospital in the province of Kwangsi, where she was the first woman doctor of Western medicine in the region.

== Early life and education ==
Bacon was born in South Wales, where her father was a colliery viewer and part of the revival of Christianity in the 19th century, leading her to seek out a career suited for missionary work.

She attended the University of Birmingham, where she was one of the first women admitted. She was forced to each lunch in a cemetery and perform dissections in a stairwell cupboard. She graduated with a Bachelor of Medicine, Bachelor of Surgery, in 1908. She then trained in Highbury at the medical hostel of the Church Mission Society (CMS).

== Career and mission work ==
Bacon's first position after graduating was at Birmingham Children's Hospital, where she was the first woman doctor. In 1910, she moved to Hong Kong to study the Chinese language. The following year, she joined the Kwangsi-Hunan Mission in Kweilin, which had been established by Louis Byrd in 1899. She was the first woman to practice Western medicine in the region. There she met John Lionel Bacon, a newly ordained deacon, whom she later married.

After a few months of work, the Wuchang Uprising forced Bacon and the other missionaries in Kwangsi and Hunan to leave for some time. During this time, Bacon went to Hong Kong where she worked at Tung Wah Hospital, where she became a tropical disease specialist and gained surgical experience. After the uprising, she returned to Kwangsi where she continued seeing patients and opened dispensaries throughout the city.

Bacon and her husband had four children, two of whom died—one in China in 1914 and another in England in 1918. In 1917, her husband went to work with the YMCA as a missionary among the Chinese Labour Corps in France. He was shot and killed there in 1918.

In 1920, Bacon returned to China, where she helped build and run Way of Life Hospital, which became the leading women's hospital in the region. It cost US$12,000 and was funded by donations from England, which she collected during her visits there. It opened in 1921. In 1928, she was the principal of a women's training college while on furlough from the hospital. She remained there, returning to England once per year to see her children, until 1944, when she was evacuated from China.

Bacon died in 1976 in England.

== Publications ==
- Bacon, Charlotte (1929). Where East Meets West in China. England: Marshall, Morgan & Scott.
