= James Bacon =

James or Jim Bacon may refer to:

- Jim Bacon (politician) (James Alexander Bacon, 1950–2004), Premier of Tasmania, 1998–2004
- Jim Bacon (rugby) (1896–1968), rugby union and rugby league footballer
- Jim Bacon (weather forecaster) (born 1950), BBC weather forecaster
- Sir James Bacon (judge) (1798–1895), British bankruptcy court judge and a Vice-Chancellor of Chancery Court
- James Bacon (author) (1914–2010), American author and actor
- James Bacon (architect), American architect
- Ed Bacon (priest) (James Edwin Bacon Jr., born 1948), American Episcopalian priest
- James E. Bacon (rancher) (1909–1997), American avocado grower, rancher and horticulturist
