= Harriet Bacon MacDonald =

American musician (1865–1935)

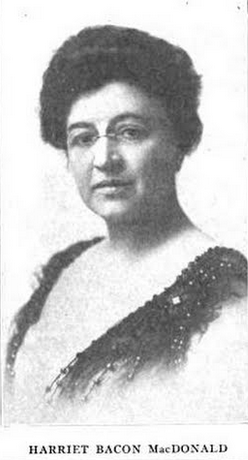
- Born: November 24, 1865; Hyannis, Massachusetts
- Died: October 11, 1935; Dallas, Texas
- Occupation(s): Musician, educator, impresaria, conductor

Harriet Bacon MacDonald (November 24, 1865 – October 11, 1935) was an American musician, impresaria and conductor, based in Dallas, Texas.

== Early life ==
MacDonald was born in Hyannis, Massachusetts, the daughter of Nathaniel Bacon III and Cornelia W. Sherman Bacon. She began piano studies in Boston under James M. Tracy, and pursued further training in Europe.

== Career ==
MacDonald was a professional accompanist in Europe and the United States. She was a founding member of the Norma Trio, and toured with Constance Balfour's concert company. In 1910, she opened a piano studio in Dallas. She taught music classes according to the Dunning system, and held leadership positions in the Texas Music Teachers' Association. She also taught classes on the Dunning system to teachers in Cleveland, Chicago, Albuquerque, New Mexico, and Little Rock, Arkansas.

MacDonald conducted concerts of the Dallas Schubert Club, and organized concerts by European and American musical acts, including Albert Spalding, Rosa Ponselle, Mischa Elman, Sergei Rachmaninoff and John Philip Sousa. She faced financial difficulties during the Great Depression, and stopped organizing and promoting concerts in 1934.

== Personal life ==
Harriet Bacon MacDonald married James R. Saville. She died in 1935, aged 69 years. Her widower donated her papers, including correspondence, photographs, and theatrical ephemera, to Southern Methodist University soon after her death. There is another box of her photographs at the Fort Worth Public Library Archives.
