= Nathaniel Bacon =

Nathaniel Bacon may refer to:

- Sir Nathaniel Bacon of Stiffkey (died 1622), lawyer and MP for Norfolk, half-brother of Francis Bacon
- Nathaniel Bacon (painter) (1585–1627), landowner and painter, nephew of Francis Bacon
- Nathaniel Bacon of Friston (1593–1644), committeeman active with the Suffolk Committees for Scandalous Ministers
- Nathaniel Bacon (English politician) (1593–1660), member of parliament representing Cambridge University and Ipswich
- Nathaniel Bacon (Jesuit) (1598–1676), secretary of the Society of Jesus (in Rome), 1674–1676
- Nathaniel Bacon (Virginia politician) (c. 1620–1692), first cousin of Virginia rebel (see next), president of Virginia's upper house (Governor's Council), plantation owner of Cheatham Annex, and a colonel
- Nathaniel Bacon (Virginia colonist) (1647–1676), first cousin of Virginia president (see previous), member of Virginia's lower house (House of Burgesses), plantation owner, and instigator of Bacon's Rebellion in 1676
- Nathaniel Bacon (Michigan jurist) (1802–1869), member of the Michigan Supreme Court, 1855–1857

== See also ==
- Nathaniel Bacon School, a historic school building in Richmond, Virginia
