= Florence Hannah Bacon Marsh =

British botanist (1881–1948)

Florence Hannah Bacon Marsh (1881–1948) was a British botanist noted for studying the flora of Herefordshire. Florence Marsh was a consultant for the Wild Flower Society. In recognition of her services, she was made a member of the Botanical Society and in 1935 a member of the Linnean Society.
