= Henry Bacon (disambiguation) =

Henry Bacon (1866–1924) was an American Beaux-Arts architect.

Henry Bacon may also refer to:

- Henry Bacon (painter) (1839–1912), American painter
- Henry Bacon (basketball) (born 1948), American basketball player
- Henry Bacon (New York politician) (1846–1915), U.S. Representative from New York
