= Margaret Bacon =

Margaret Bacon may refer to:

- Peggy Bacon (Margaret Frances Bacon, 1895–1987), American printmaker, illustrator, painter and writer
- Peggy Bacon (radio producer) (Margaret Bacon, 1918–1976), English radio and television producer and radio presenter
- Margaret Hope Bacon (1921–2011), American Quaker historian, author and lecturer
