= Elizabeth Bacon =

Elizabeth Bacon may refer to:

- Elizabeth Bacon (died 1621), English aristocrat
- Elizabeth D. Bacon (1844–1917), American suffragist
- Elizabeth Bacon Custer (1842–1933), American author and public speaker
