= Lori Bacon =

Canadian female entrepreneur

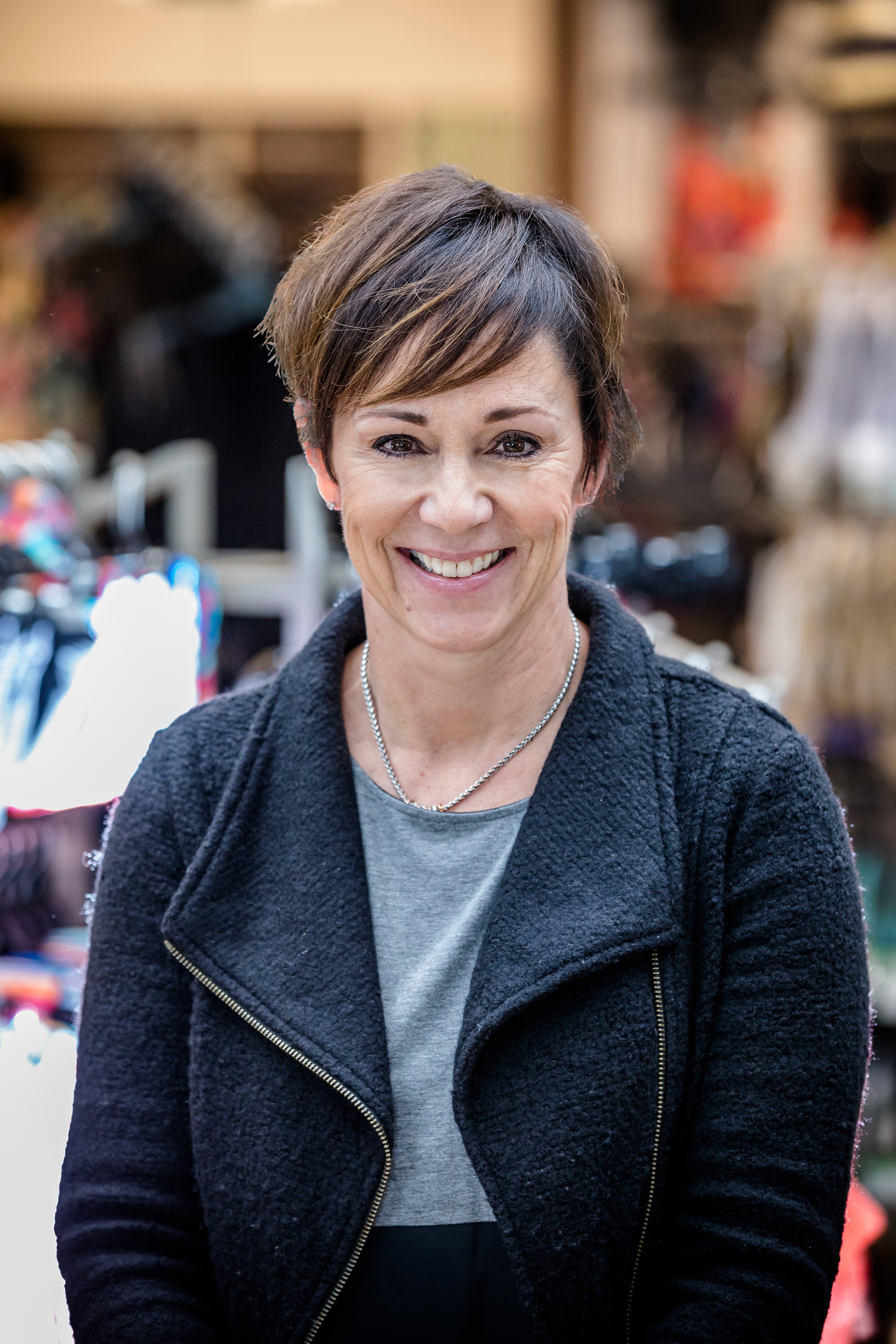
- Born: 1959 (age 66–67)
- Education: University of Calgary
- Years active: 1981–present
- Known for: Swimco

Lori Bacon (born 1959) is a Canadian female entrepreneur based in Alberta. She is the president of swimwear retail chain Swimco. In 2010, Bacon won Enterprising Women of the Year Awards.

== Early life and career ==
Lori Bacon was born in Edmonton in 1959 and raised in Calgary. She graduated from the Haskayne School of Business of University of Calgary with a Bachelor of Commerce degree in marketing. Bacon later became president of Swimco, a company founded by her mother, Corinne Forseth in 1975. In 2009, she became a member of the Women Presidents' Organization based in New York, US. According to the Calgary Herald, she has expanded Swimco across Western Canada and into Ontario.

In 2010, Bacon was nominated and won the 8th Annual Enterprising Women of the Year Awards.

== Institutional positions ==
- President at Swimco
