= Francis Bacon (disambiguation) =

Francis Bacon (1561–1626) was an English Elizabethan philosopher, statesman and essayist.

Francis Bacon may also refer to:

- Francis Bacon (artist) (1909–1992), Irish-born English figurative painter
- Francis Bacon (cricketer) (1869–1915), English cricketer
- Francis Bacon (American football) (1894 – 1977), American football, baseball, and basketball player
- Francis Bacon (Ipswich MP) (1600–1663), English politician
- Francis Bacon (judge) (1587–1657), English judge
- Francis Thomas Bacon (1904–1992), English engineer who developed the hydrogen-oxygen fuel cell
- Francis M. Bacon (1835–1912), American woolen manufacturer and banker
- Francis T. Bacon (c. 1865–1909), supervising architect of the Illinois Central Railroad system

== See also ==
- Frank Bacon (disambiguation)
