= Nicholas Bacon =

Nicholas Bacon may refer to:

- Sir Nicholas Bacon (Lord Keeper) (1510–1579), English politician during the reign of Queen Elizabeth I, Lord Keeper of the Great Seal
- Sir Nicholas Bacon, 1st Baronet, of Redgrave (c. 1540–1624), his son, the first man created a baronet
- Sir Nicholas Bacon, 1st Baronet, of Gillingham (1623–1666), English lawyer
- Sir Nicholas Bacon, 14th Baronet (born 1953), Premier Baronet of England, lawyer, and Page of Honour to Queen Elizabeth II
- Nicholas Bacon (Ipswich MP) (1622–1687), M.P. for Ipswich, 1685–1687
