= Ken Bacon =

Ken Bacon may refer to:

- Kenneth Bacon (1944–2009), American journalist
- Ken Bacon (politician) (born 1944), Australian politician
