= Eugenia M. Bacon =

American suffragist and advocate for public libraries

- Born: Eugenia McKenzie; October 4, 1853; Bowling Green, Indiana
- Died: December 10, 1933 (aged 80); Decatur, Illinois
- Occupations: Suffragist, Clubwoman
- Spouse: George R. Bacon (m. 1874; died in 1911)

Eugenia McKenzie Bacon (1853–1933) was an American suffragist and advocate for public libraries in Illinois.

== Life ==
Bacon née McKenzie was born on October 4, 1853, in Bowling Green, Indiana.

Bacon was a suffragist, advocating for women's rights at the Illinois state legislature. She also authored suffragist pamphlets. Bacon corresponded with reformer Jane Addams and promoted Addams' social reform ideas among Illinois women's clubs. In a 1910 letter, Bacon praised The Spirit of Youth and the City Streets and encouraged members of the Illinois Federation of Women's Clubs to read it as part of their civic education.

Bacon was president of the Illinois Federation of Women's Clubs (IFWC) from 1902 to 1904. She was also the General Federation's state chairman of correspondence from June 1898 to October 1902. She was an officer of the Decatur Women's Club for ten years, five of which were as president. She then served for two terms as the State Secretary for Illinois at the General Federation of Women's Clubs. As part of her work for the IFWC Bacon was the only woman on the Library Extension Commission, working to establish public libraries in Illinois. The Illinois Library Extension Commission consisted of James A. Rose, Joseph Freeman, and Bacon who served as Secretary of the Board.

Bacon's work on the Illinois Library Extension Commission reflected a broader movement in which women's clubs played a central role in establishing free public libraries throughout the United States. Historian Paula D. Watson identifies state federations of women's clubs as among the most influential advocates for library legislation and library extension in the late nineteenth and early twentieth centuries.

Bacon served as the Illinois editor of The Club Woman, the official publication of the General Federation of Women's Clubs.

In 1874, she married George R. Bacon (1845–1911) with whom she had one child who died at the age of eight. Immediately following their wedding, Eugenia and George Bacon traveled across the United States on the newly opened Central Pacific Railway to San Francisco, and then by ocean vessel to Portland, Oregon by river to Camp Harney. After three years Eugenia became severely ill while George Bacon was away on an expedition and returned to Illinois for medical treatment. Her husband soon resigned his army position to join her.

Bacon died on December 10, 1933, in Decatur, Illinois.

== See also ==
- List of suffragists and suffragettes
