= Robert Bacon (writer) =

English monk and writer

Robert Bacon (died 1248) was the first Dominican writer in England.

== Biography ==
=== Early life ===
He was, according to some accounts the brother, according to others the uncle, of Roger Bacon. He is described as already an old man in 1238. He was educated at Oxford, where he was first the pupil and afterwards the friend and fellow-lecturer of Edmund Rich, on whose life he later wrote. He went with his friend Richard Fishaker to study at the University of Paris. According to the Biographia Britannica, in 1233 he succeeded Edmund Rich as treasurer of Salisbury Cathedral.

=== Conflict with Henry III ===
He had joined the order of the Dominicans (already been settled near Oxford), and was lecturing in the new schools they had founded in St. Edward's parish. It was in 1233 that the most important of his recorded acts took place. Henry III had sent a second and a third summons to his baronage to meet him at Oxford, but they, justly incensed at his notorious fondness for foreigners and subservience to his two stranger favourites, Peter des Roches, bishop of Winchester, and Peter de Rivaux, refused to appear. It was in this time of waiting and suspense that Robert Bacon, one of the new order of friar preachers or Dominicans who had been chosen to preach before the king and his assembled bishops, had the boldness to tell Henry to his face that he would never enjoy lasting peace until he had banished Peter des Roches (Petrum de Rupibus) and his fellows from his councils. To this advice many of those present assented, and, after a while, the king himself acknowledged the wisdom of the course recommended; whereupon, seeing the king in so gracious a mood, a certain clerk attached to the royal court, called by the old authorities Roger Bacon, asked a sarcastic riddle: "Lord king, what is the greatest danger to those who are crossing the straits?" Henry made answer in the words of Scripture that they could tell whose business was on the great deep. "Nay, my lord," answered the clerk, "I will tell thee — Petræ et Rupes" ("Rocks and Cliffs") — a bitter allusion to Peter des Roches. It seems almost certain that the Roger here must be a mistake. Roger Bacon cannot at this time have been old enough to play such a part, and was then a young student at Oxford or elsewhere. Moreover, as there is clear evidence that the first half of this story (which on the best manuscript authority belongs to Robert) has been attributed to Roger Bacon by later mediaeval writers, we can hardly be wrong if we bear Fuller's words in mind, and with him read Robert in the second instance as well as in the first.

=== Dominican friar ===
Robert Bacon, then, was a Dominican friar in 1233, and to this fact we may add that although an old man upon entering that order he did not desist from his public lectures. His friend Richard Fishaker was associated with him in this work – a pair of friends so devoted to one another that Leland says writers of that age never disassociated their names, and that even death could not divide them. Both died in the same year, 1248, and were buried in the church of their order at Oxford. Matthew Paris considers their decease worthy of a place in his history, adding that it was the common opinion of that age that no contemporary writers surpassed or even equalled these two, whether in theology or other branches of learning, and paying a final tribute to their great zeal in the work of public preaching.

== Possible references to Bacon ==
In addition to the above facts a few others may be gleaned from stray letters of the period. It is probable that it is to Robert Bacon and not to Roger that Thomas de Eccleston alludes as having entered the order of friar preachers on the first day without a year's novitiate. The manuscript has R. Bacon, but the context seems to show that the date of the occurrence was under Gregory IX, at which time Roger would be too young; the person alluded to is spoken of as bonæ memoriæ, ("well remembered") a phrase which could hardly be applied to one still living, as Roger would be at that time; and, lastly, the whole preceding passage has reference to the "Fratres Prædicatores", of which body Robert was a member, whereas Roger Bacon was a Franciscan. Again, Robert Grosseteste, in a letter to William de Raley, refusing to appoint the latter's nephew – a boy not yet out of his Ovid – to a cure of souls, calls Robert Bacon to witness that he is willing to allow the lad ten marks a year out of his private purse. Here, again, we have Roger in the manuscript, but the date (1235?) clearly puts him out of court, and in Luard's edition of the bishop's letters the story is indexed to Robert. In any case Robert Bacon, the first Dominican writer in England, can hardly fail to have been a friend of Grosseteste, the great patron of the new orders; nor this last to have been acquainted with one who was, as Trivet tells us, the ruling theological power at Oxford.

== Works ==
The list of Robert Bacon's works, as given by John Bale, includes a Liber in sententias Tetri Lorubardi, Lectiones Ordinaræ, Liber super Psalterium. To this list Anthony à Wood adds a work called Syncategorement, on the manuscript of which the words "Roberti Baconis" are said to appear. Robert Bacon was the author of at least one life of his friend and master, Edmund Rich. Portions of this are probably worked up – with, however, an entire alteration of style – into Surins's Life of St. Edmund (iv. 368, 16 Nov.); but as a separate work it has perished, together with the life of the same archbishop, which Matthew Paris tells us he drew up on the same authority.
