= Orrin Bacon =

American politician

Orrin Bacon (October 4, 1820 – November 17, 1893) was an American miller and politician.

Born in Barnstable, Massachusetts, Bacon moved to Wisconsin in 1848. He first settled in Janesville, Wisconsin and then in 1855 moved to Green County, Wisconsin living in Monticello, Wisconsin. Bacon was a miller. In 1871, Bacon served in the Wisconsin State Assembly and was a Republican. He then served in the Wisconsin State Senate in 1872 and 1873. Bacon died of influenza in Monticello, Wisconsin. He was buried at Lima Center Cemetery in Lima Center, Wisconsin.
