= Frederick S. Bacon =

American football coach

Biographical details
- Born: February 27, 1877; Middletown, Connecticut, U.S.
- Died: March 16, 1961 (aged 84); Glenside, Pennsylvania, U.S.
- Education: Trinity (CT) (1899)

Coaching career (HC unless noted)
- 1902: Trinity (CT)

Head coaching record
- Overall: 0–4

Frederick Stanley Bacon (February 27, 1877 – March 16, 1961) was an American football coach and lawyer. He served as the head football coach at Trinity College in Hartford, Connecticut in 1902, compiling a record of 0–4. Bacon was an 1899 graduate of Trinity. He also earned degree from Yale Law School and worked as an attorney for the state highway department in Connecticut.

== Head coaching record ==
Year	Team	Overall	Conference	Standing	Bowl/playoffs
Trinity Bantams (Independent) (1902)
1902	Trinity	0–4			
Trinity:		0–4			
Total:		0–4			
