= Cyrus Bacon =

American politician

Member of the Michigan House of Representatives from the Cass County district
- In office January 1, 1849 – April 2, 1849

Personal details
- Born: c. 1796 Ballston, New York
- Died: October 4, 1873 (aged 77) Ontwa Township, Michigan, U. S.

Cyrus Bacon (c. 1796 – October 4, 1873) was a Michigan politician.

Bacon was born in Ballston, New York. On November 6, 1848, Bacon was elected to the Michigan House of Representatives, where he represented the Cass County district from January 1, 1849, to April 2, 1849. Bacon served on the Ways and Means committee. During his time in the legislature, he lived in Ontwa, Michigan.
