= John E. Bacon (South Carolina politician) =

American lawyer, politician, diplomat and judge

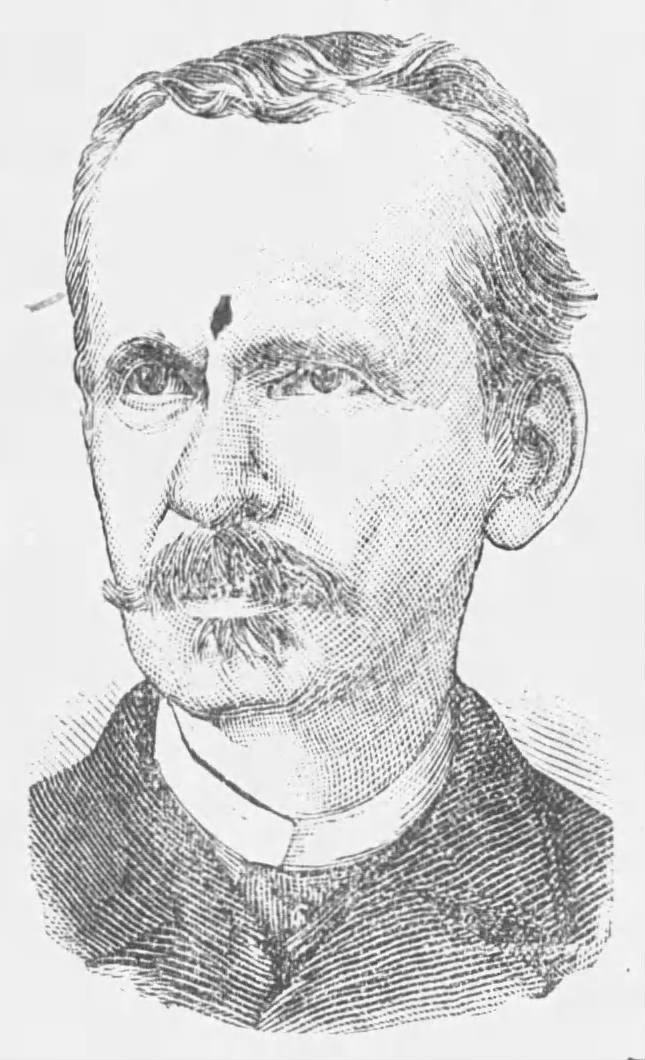
- Butler, ca. 1886

Personal details
- Born: 1830
- Died: 1897 (aged 66–67)
- Profession: Politician, diplomat

John Edmund Bacon (1830 – 1897) was an American lawyer, politician, diplomat and judge, from South Carolina, in the late 19th century. He also acted as charge d'affairs (1885–1888) and minister-resident (1888) of the U.S.to Uruguay and Paraguay.

== Life and career ==
Bacon was a member of South Carolina's provisional congress in 1862, served the Confederate Army during the American Civil War, and was a diplomat in South America.

He married Rebecca Calhoun Pickens while serving as Secretary of the American Legation in St. Petersburg, Russia.

He served in the Confederate Army. After the Civil War they resided in Columbia, South Carolina.

He served as an American diplomat in Paraguay and Uruguay. His wife's letters from Montevideo were published in the Home Journal.

He paid tribute to John Parsons Carroll, his former law partner.
