= Edmund Bacon =

Edmund Bacon may refer to:

- Sir Edmund Bacon, 2nd Baronet, of Redgrave (c. 1570–1649), English MP for Eye and for Norfolk in 1593 and 1625
- Sir Edmund Bacon, 2nd Baronet, of Gillingham (c. 1660–1683), see Bacon baronets
- Sir Edmund Bacon, 4th Baronet, of Mildenhall (1672–1721), British MP for Orford
- Sir Edmund Bacon, 4th Baronet, of Redgrave (died 1685), father in law of Sir Edmund Bacon, 5th Baronet
- Sir Edmund Bacon, 5th Baronet (1693–1738), British MP for Thetford, 1722–1738
- Sir Edmund Bacon, 6th Baronet, of Mildenhall (1725–1750), see Bacon baronets
- Sir Edmund Bacon, 6th Baronet, of Redgrave (c. 1680–1755), British MP for Thetford, 1710–1713, and for Norfolk, 1713–1715 and 1728–1741
- Edmund Bacon (1785–1866), business manager and overseer for Thomas Jefferson, 3rd President of the United States
- Sir Edmund Bacon, 13th Baronet (1903–1982), Lord Lieutenant of Norfolk
- Edmund Bacon (architect) (1910–2005), American urban planner, architect, educator and author

== See also ==
- Ed Bacon (disambiguation)
