= Dick Bacon =

Male nudist from Wisconsin

- Dick Bacon
- Born: Richard Bacon; September 9, 1932; Milwaukee, Wisconsin, U.S.
- Died: August 18, 2000 (aged 67)
- Education: High School
- Occupation: Brewery worker
- Years active: 1962–2000
- Spouse: Connie (Divorced)
- Family: Brother Howard Bacon; Sister Mary Rose Ried

Dick Bacon (September 9, 1932 – August 18, 2000) was a nudist or naturist from Milwaukee, Wisconsin who was known for outdoor tanning every day of the year. He worked at Pabst Brewery in Milwaukee, Wisconsin. He sun tanned year-round at Milwaukee's Bradford Beach on Lake Michigan. Bacon also frequented a nude beach in Milwaukee called Paradise Beach.

== Tanning ==
Bacon could be seen tanning at Bradford Beach from the 1960s through the 1990s, including in freezing weather. If the beach was covered in snow, Bacon would have a path cleared to his tanning spot.

Bacon said that he only wanted to work enough to support himself. He claimed to be planning for retirement from the time he was a child.

In addition to tanning at Bradford Beach in Milwaukee, Bacon also tanned at the nude beach in Milwaukee, Paradise Beach which closed in 1993. Newspapers called him a crusader for nude beaches. Bacon claimed that he fell in love with nudity while modeling for artists at the University of Wisconsin.

When Bacon died, the Madison, Wisconsin State Journal deemed him a "Beach Legend".

== Arrests ==
- In 1977, he was charged with lewd and lascivious behavior for bathing in the nude at Bradford Beach in Milwaukee on New Year's Day.
- In 1979 he and three other men were arrested for nudity on Paradise Beach.
- In 1991, Bacon was arrested for appearing nude just north of Bradford Beach in Milwaukee.
- In 1993, he was cited for indecent exposure in the vicinity of Paradise Beach in Milwaukee.

== Awards ==
In 1973 in Indiana, Bacon won the Mr. Nude America contest. One of the judges of the contest was a novelist, Erskine Caldwell. The prize for winning the contest was $500. Bacon was very proud to be a nudist and he owned a white van emblazoned with his nickname, “The Nude Dude.” He won three nude modeling contests during the mid-1970's.

== Death ==
Bacon died in his South Side (Milwaukee) home on August 18, 2000, at age 67, from a heart attack. Bacon was survived by his three siblings: Howard Bacon II, and Mary Rose Reid and Roger Bacon.

== See also ==
- List of clothing-free events
- Nude beach
- Nude recreation
- Nude swimming
- Nudity
- Sun tanning
