= Don Bacon (baseball) =

American baseball player and manager

Donald John Bacon (born June 28, 1935 in Oklahoma City, Oklahoma United States) is a former minor league baseball player and manager. He led the Midwest League Clinton C-Sox to a league championship in 1963.

== Education ==
Bacon attended Sapulpa High School and then Oklahoma A&M. During his senior year at Sapulpa High School, he won all-state honors. While at college, he played both baseball and basketball.

== Playing career ==
Bacon was an infielder, playing from 1955 to 1958 and from 1961 to 1964 in the Chicago White Sox farm system. Despite collecting over 100 hits in a season five times, Bacon never collected more than 24 extra base hits in a single year. Overall, he played in 790 minor league games, collecting 704 hits. He batted .262.

== Managerial career ==
Bacon's first year as a manager was spent with the C-Sox in 1963, the same year he led them to a league championship. He won the Midwest League Manager of the Year Award in 1963. He started 1964 as the team's manager, however he was replaced by Hugh Mulcahy, who was eventually replaced by Bacon himself. Bacon managed the Sarasota Sun Sox to an 85-53 record in 1965. In 1966, he led the Deerfield Beach/Winter Haven Sun Sox to a 55-83 record. He was the youngest manager in the White Sox system during his time as minor league manager.
