= Rick Bacon =

Canadian volleyball player (born 1955)

Personal information
- Born: 17 January 1955 (age 70); Windsor, Nova Scotia, Canada

Sport
- Sport: Volleyball

Rick Bacon (born 17 January 1955) is a Canadian former volleyball player. He competed in the men's tournament at the 1984 Summer Olympics.
