= Charles Bacon (sculptor) =

English sculptor

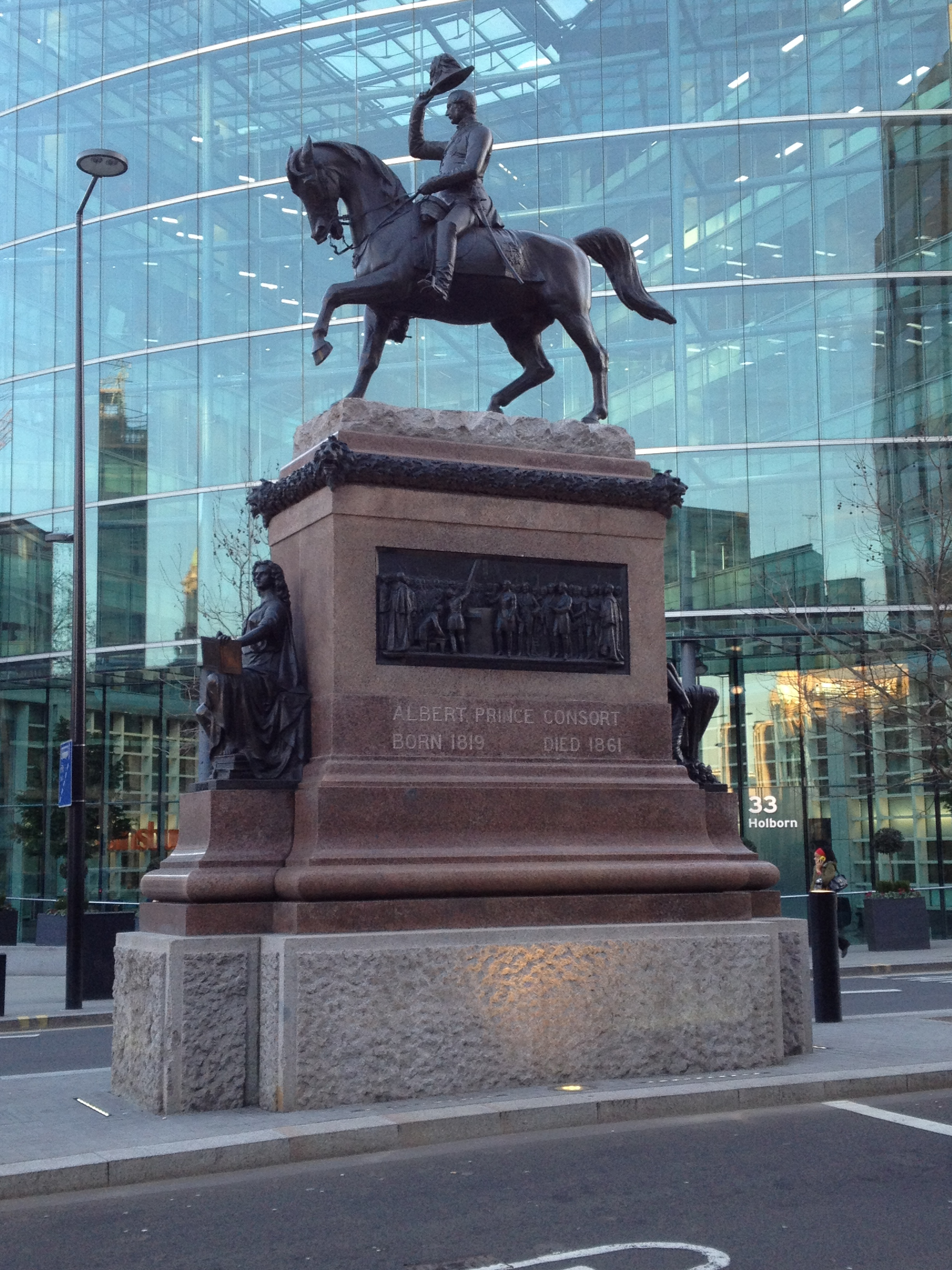
Statue of Prince Albert, Holborn Circus

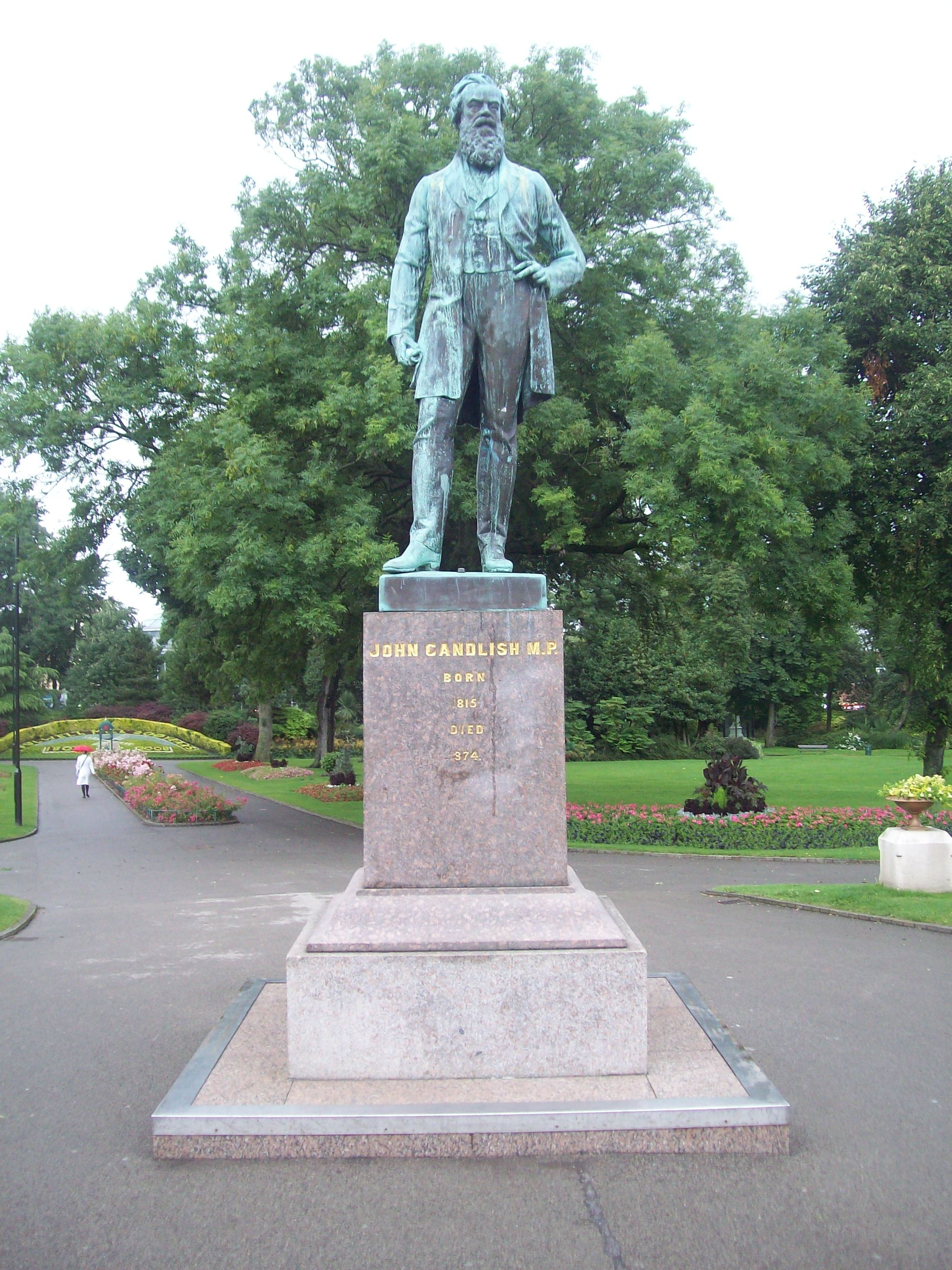
John Candlish statue in Sunderland

Charles Bacon (1821–1886) was an English sculptor primarily remembered for his equestrian statue of Prince Albert at Holborn Circus in central London.

== Life ==
He was born in London the son of John Bacon a print compositor.

He originally trained as a gem-cutter and seal-maker working in Pentonville but moved from this to intaglio work (exhibiting in the Royal Academy from 1841) and then at the suggestion and promotion of poet and friend Alaric Watts he trained as a sculptor at the Royal Academy Schools from 1846. He exhibited at the Royal Academy from 1842 to 1884.

From 1861 he has studios at Sloan Street in Chelsea. By 1884 when he retired he was the Bolton's Studios in South Kensington.

He died at home, East Dome House in Bognor Regis on 1 April 1886.

== Family ==
His family home was at 7 Loughborough Place in Brixton where his son Charles Irvine Bacon and three daughters were born.

== Most Notable Works ==
- Bust of Alaric Watts (1847)
- Helen Veiled Before Paris (1853)
- Bust of George Grote (1855) in Westminster Abbey
- Statue of Sir John Franklin (1861) in Spilsby
- Bust of Warren Stormes Hale (Lord Mayor) (1864) in City of London School
- Rev G F W Mortimr (1864) in City of London School
- Bust of Henry Faudel (1864)
- Bust of William Shakespeare (1864) in Agricultural Hall in Islington
- Bust of Sir George Farrow (1865)
- Bust of Prince Alfred the Duke of Edinburgh (1867)
- Equestrian statue of Prince Albert (1874) at Holborn Circus
- Statue of John Candlish (1875) in Sunderland
- Bust of Richard Durnford the Bishop of Chichester (1884)
