= John Bacon (English judge) =

British judge

John Bacon (died 1321) was an English judge.

Bacon is first mentioned as acting in the capacity of attorney to Queen Eleanor in 1278–9, and is described in certain indentures of the exchequer, dated 1288, as 'clericus Regis' and 'custos rotulorum et brevium de Banco' and 'Regis thesauriarius et camerarius,' his business being to keep a list of the cases argued in the common pleas, and to transmit records thereof, and also 'pedes chirographorum,' i.e. memoranda of fines levied throughout the country, to the treasurers and chamberlains of the exchequer, of the receipt of which the indentures already mentioned were acknowledgments. The 'chirographa,' or fines in question, were fictitious suits, by means of which it was the custom to bar entails and convey the landed property of married women. Bacon seems to have held this post as late as 1309. In 1291 he was entrusted with the charge of Leeds Castle in Kent (a royal residence). In 1313 he was appointed to a justiceship of the common pleas, and in the same year we read of his being retained in London to advise the king upon some important matters. In 1314 he was made one of the commissioners of oyer and terminer for the counties of Norfolk and Suffolk, to try certain assessors and collectors of the revenue charged with breach of trust. In 1315 William de Beresford, the chief justice of the common pleas, being suddenly summoned to the king, the business of the court devolved upon Thrikingham and Bacon exclusively. We may conjecture that it was not very promptly or efficiently despatched, for it was but a short time since he had been enjoined to pay a more diligent attention to duty. In 1317 he was summoned with the rest of the judges to parliament at Lincoln, but the invasion of the Scots in that year caused the postponement of the parliament sine die. In 1320 he was placed on a commission to try certain persons charged with debasing and counterfeiting the coinage in the counties of Essex, Norfolk, and Suffolk, and in 1321 upon another directed to inquire into offences committed by sheriffs and other legal functionaries under colour of their official duties in the counties of Norfolk, Suffolk, Cambridge, and Huntingdon. He appears to have died in this year, Stonore being appointed justice of the common pleas in his place. He had landed property in Reston, Hemingston, Cleydon, and Akenham, places all of them in the county of Suffolk, and also in Essex, and at Shouldham in Norfolk.
