= Don Bacon (microbiologist) =

New Zealand microbiologist (1926–2020)

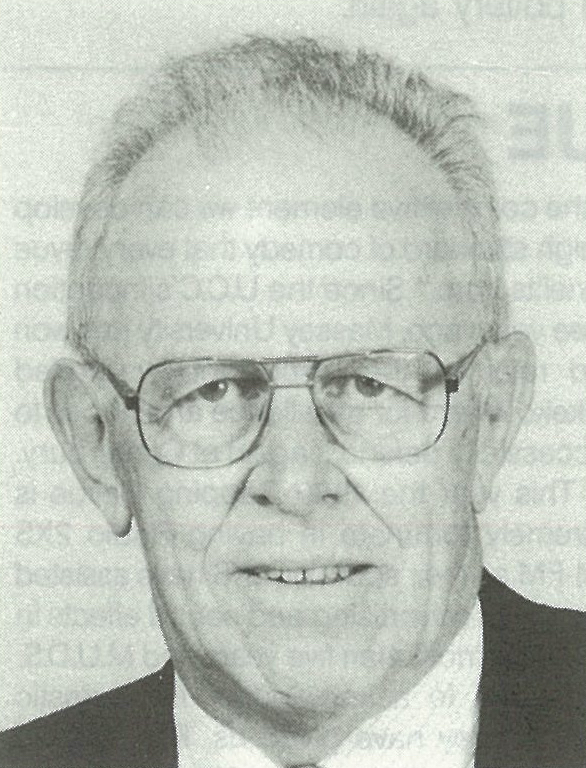
- Born: Donald Frederick Bacon; 6 April 1926; Gisborne, New Zealand
- Died: 28 August 2020 (aged 94); Palmerston North, New Zealand
- Education: Yale University
- Spouse: Florence Zoe Thanassi (died 2010)
- Scientific career
- Fields: Microbiology
- Workplaces: University of Otago; Massey University
- Thesis: Studies of mutational processes in bacteria (1958)

Donald Frederick Bacon (6 April 1926 – 28 August 2020) was a New Zealand microbiologist. In 1966, he was appointed the inaugural professor of microbiology at Massey University, where he remained until his retirement in 1989.

== Biography ==
Born in Gisborne on 6 April 1926, Bacon was the son of Mabel Tui Bacon (née Allott) and Frederick George Bacon. He was educated at Gisborne High School, and in 1944 began training as a medical laboratory technician at Cook Hospital.

In 1947, Bacon began studying at the University of Otago, graduating Bachelor of Science in 1950, and Master of Science with first-class honours in 1954. From 1951, he worked as an assistant lecturer in the Department of Microbiology at Otago, assisting Molly Marples in the teaching of the second-year course and the introduction of the third-year course in microbiology. During the summer recesses between 1951 and 1955, Bacon joined health research teams funded by the Medical Research Council in Niue and Samoa.

Assisted by a Fulbright Scholarship, Bacon undertook doctoral studies at Yale University in the United States, completing his PhD in 1958. His doctoral thesis was titled Studies of mutational processes in bacteria, and was particularly concerned with mutations in Escherichia coli. While at Yale, Bacon met his future wife, Flo Thanassi, a research assistant at the university; they became engaged in 1957 and later married.

Bacon returned to teaching and research at Otago, until being appointed the first professor of microbiology, and head of the Department of Microbiology and Genetics, at Massey University in Palmerston North in 1966. He continued his research into the genetics of E. coli and associated bacteriophages until retiring in 1989. On his retirement, he was conferred the title of professor emeritus.

Bacon died in Palmerston North on 28 August 2020, aged 94. He had been predeceased by his wife, Flo, in 2010.
