= Max Bacon (politician) =

American politician

Personal details
- Born: Max E. Bacon; June 6, 1941 (age 85) Springfield, Missouri, U.S.
- Party: Democratic
- Education: Southwest Missouri State University (BS); University of Missouri
- Occupation: Attorney

Max E. Bacon (born June 6, 1941) was a member of the Missouri House of Representatives from 1970 until 1974 and then served as a Greene County, Missouri circuit judge from 1976 until February 1988 when he was re-elected.

== Education ==
Bacon is a native of Springfield, Missouri, where he attended public school. He graduated from Southwest Missouri State University with a B.S. in education, and from the University of Missouri, where he received his law degree.

== Career ==
He was admitted to the bar in 1968. He served as a prosecuting attorney in two Missouri counties before being elected as a Democrat to the Missouri House of Representatives.

== Personal life ==
He and his wife, Jenine, and their three children live in Springfield and attend the Broadway Baptist Church. - see White House Reference

== Singing ==
Bacon wrote music and sang with future attorney general John Ashcroft. In 1973 they recorded and released a gospel album entitled Truth: Volume One, Edition One. In 1977 they co-wrote, produced, and recorded In the Spirit of Life and Liberty. The song "Let the Eagle Soar" has been long associated with John Ashcroft. - See Reference John Ashcroft Biography

Bacon performed at Grand Country in Branson, with his family, creating shows "Ozark Mountain Jubilee" and "Sunday Gospel Jubilee".

After 27 years, Bacon's family retired from performing on Sundays, their final show was on December 11, 2016.
