= John M. Bacon =

United States Army general (1844-1913)

John Mosby Bacon
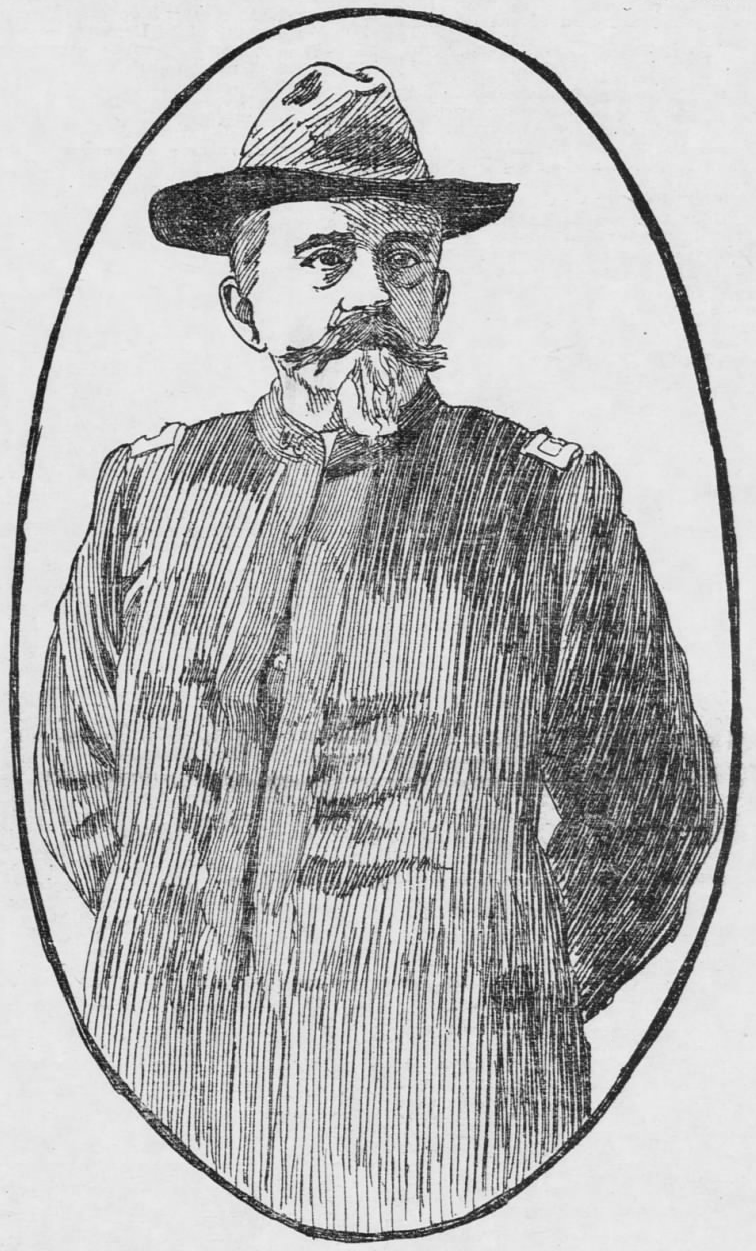
- Born: April 17, 1844; Kentucky, U.S.
- Died: March 19, 1913 (aged 68) Portland, Oregon, U.S.
- Buried: Vancouver, Washington
- Allegiance: United States
- Branch: United States Volunteers
- Service years: 1862–1865; 1866–1899
- Rank: Brigadier General
- Commands: 8th Cavalry Regiment
- Conflicts: American Civil War: Battle of Resaca; Indian Wars: Battle of Sugar Point

Brigadier General John Mosby Bacon (April 17, 1844 – March 19, 1913) was an American general of the United States Volunteers. He fought in the Battle of Sugar Point, October 5, 1898.

== Career ==
John M. Bacon was born in Kentucky on April 17, 1844. He began his military career as a volunteer serving with the 4th Kentucky Cavalry during the American Civil War, and reached the rank of major. In 1866 he was appointed captain with the Ninth Cavalry. He was twice brevetted, once for "meritorious service" at the Battle of Resaca (May 1864), and once more for "gallant service in Texas Indian campaigns." From September 9, 1890, until November 17, 1894, Bacon, then a major with the Seventh Cavalry, was an acting inspector-general.

=== Battle of Sugar Point ===
In 1898, General Bacon was stationed in Saint Paul, Minnesota, as the commanding officer of the Department of the Dakotas; he had carte blanche to deal with Indian troubles as he saw fit. In addition to the 3rd US Infantry Regiment, he also had cavalry troops nearby.

In September 1898, responding to reports of an imminent outbreak of unrest among the Pillager Band of Chippewa Indians, General Bacon sent twenty men to Lake Leech, Minnesota. He followed by rail with 80 enlisted men of the 3rd United States Infantry. Bacon and his men landed on Bear Island on October 5 at 5 am; according to the general, a gun fired by accident prompted hostilities at 11:30 am. Early reports published in the media the next day said that a massacre had occurred and that Bacon was among the dead; a headline in The Deseret News stated that "General Bacon and One Hundred Soldiers [were] Reported Killed." Those news accounts were inaccurate. Later in the day on October 6, news reports stated that Bacon's command was deemed "probably safe," and on October 7 The New York Times reported that Bacon and most of his men were safe at Walker, Minnesota. The Times account said that Bacon reported that "he has the Pillager band whipped, and that there is no need for further reinforcements." Still, The Washington Observer reported as late as October 10 that Bacon had been killed, with his men, in a massacre. In reality, the event was a major defeat for the U.S. Army, but only one officer and six men were killed.

Despite his earlier insistence that reinforcements were not necessary, on October 11 Bacon asked for troops to be sent from the 4th and 7th Infantry, and warned the Indians that thousands of men would follow them unless they surrendered those who were wanted by the federal government. At the end of the month, Company G of the Third Regiment established Camp Bacon in Walker.

== Retirement, death and legacy ==
He retired at his own request on May 8, 1899. He died in Portland, Oregon on March 19, 1913.

== See also ==
- American Indian Wars
- Native American conflicts, wars, battles, expeditions and campaigns
