= John Henry Frederick Bacon =

British painter and illustrator (1865–1914)

John Henry Frederick Bacon MVO ARA
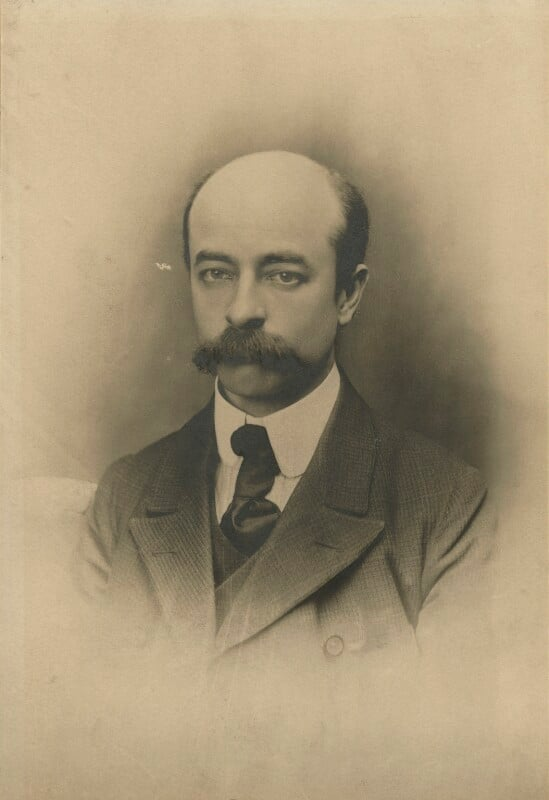
- Bacon in the 1900s
- Born: 4 November 1865; Kennington, London, England
- Died: 24 January 1914 (aged 48)

John Henry Frederick Bacon MVO ARA (4 November 1865 – 24 January 1914) was a British painter and illustrator of genre works, history and bible scenes, and portraits.

== Life and work ==
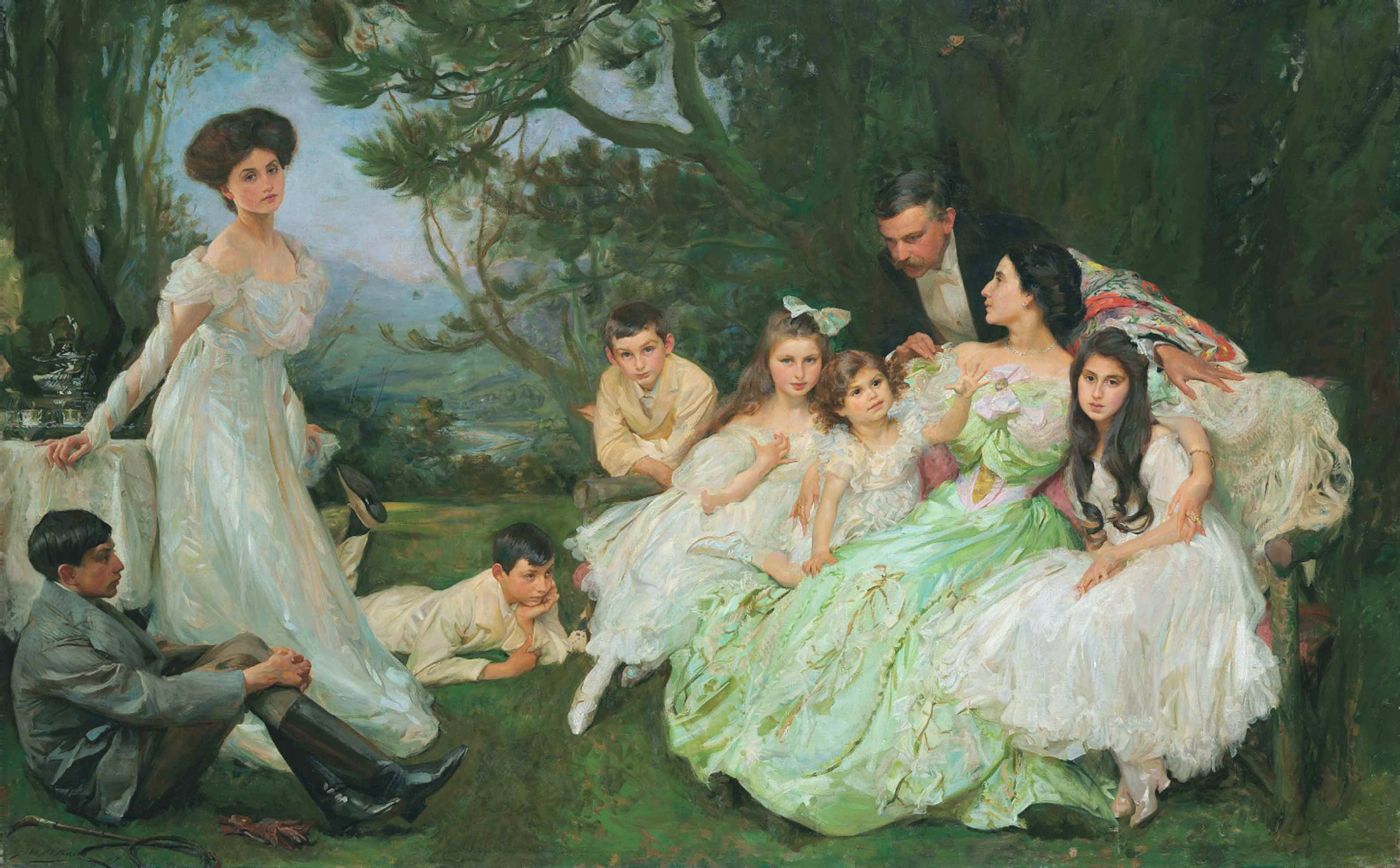
The Golden Butterfly – the Harvey family

Born in Kennington on 4 November 1865, Bacon was the second son of the lithographer John Cardanall Bacon, and showed artistic talent from a young age. He trained at the Westminster School of Art and the Royal Academy Schools in London. In his teens he acquired a reputation as an outstanding black-and-white illustrator, and at the age of 18 set off on a professional tour of India and Burma.

On his return to England, in 1889, Bacon exhibited The Village Green and Nevermore at the Royal Academy and was a regular exhibitor from then on. He was a successful painter of religious works, such as Peace be unto you (1897), Gethsemane (1899); historical scenes, such as Homage giving, Westminster Abbey (for the coronation of Edward VII), The Coronation ceremony of George V (1911), The City of London Imperial Volunteers Return to London from South Africa on Monday 29th October 1900, as well as portraiture and genre scenes – such as A Wedding Morning, (1892) A Confession of Love (1894) and Rivals (1904). He was an Associate of the Royal Academy (ARA) and was awarded the MVO (Member of the Royal Victorian Order) for distinguished service to the King. Bacon illustrated books as well as magazines and periodicals.

Bacon married in 1894 and took up residence at "Pillar House" in Harwell, Berkshire (now in Oxfordshire). He had 7 children. He died of acute bronchitis on 24 January 1914, aged 48.

== Selected works ==
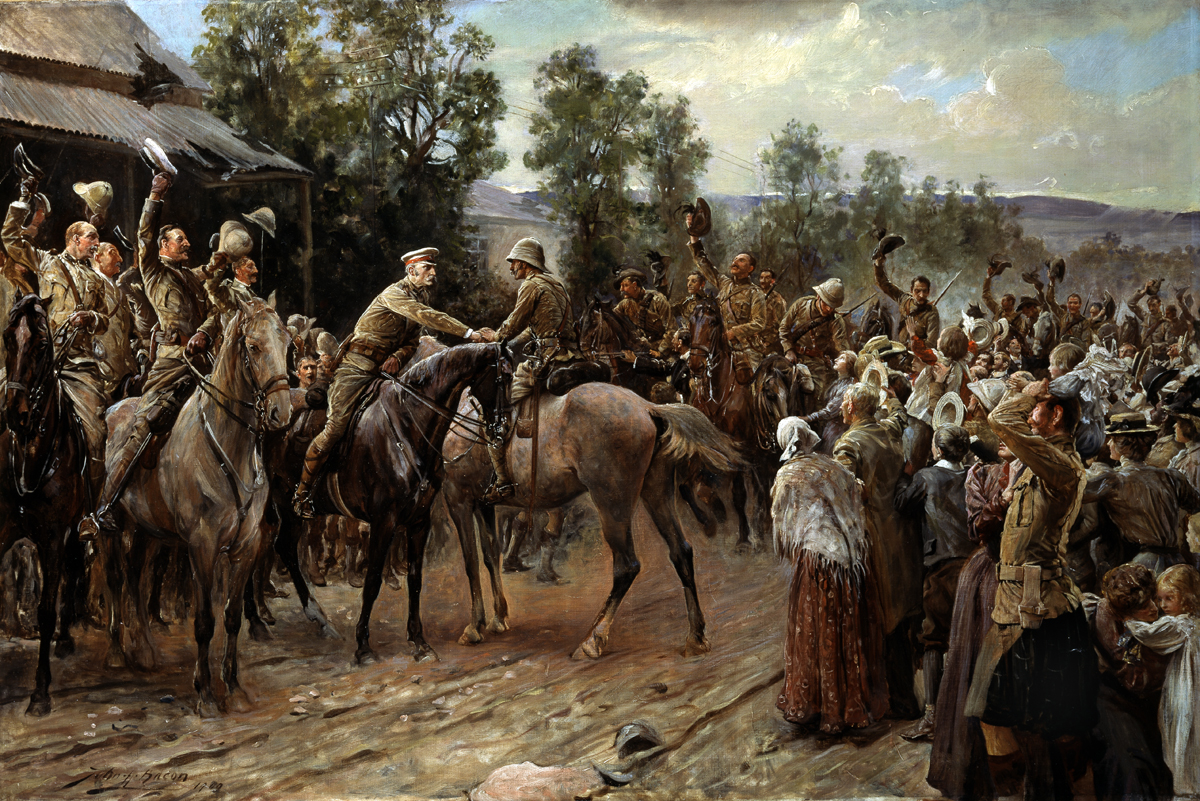
Relief of Ladysmith depicting Sir George Stuart White greeting Major Hubert Gough on 28 February 1900

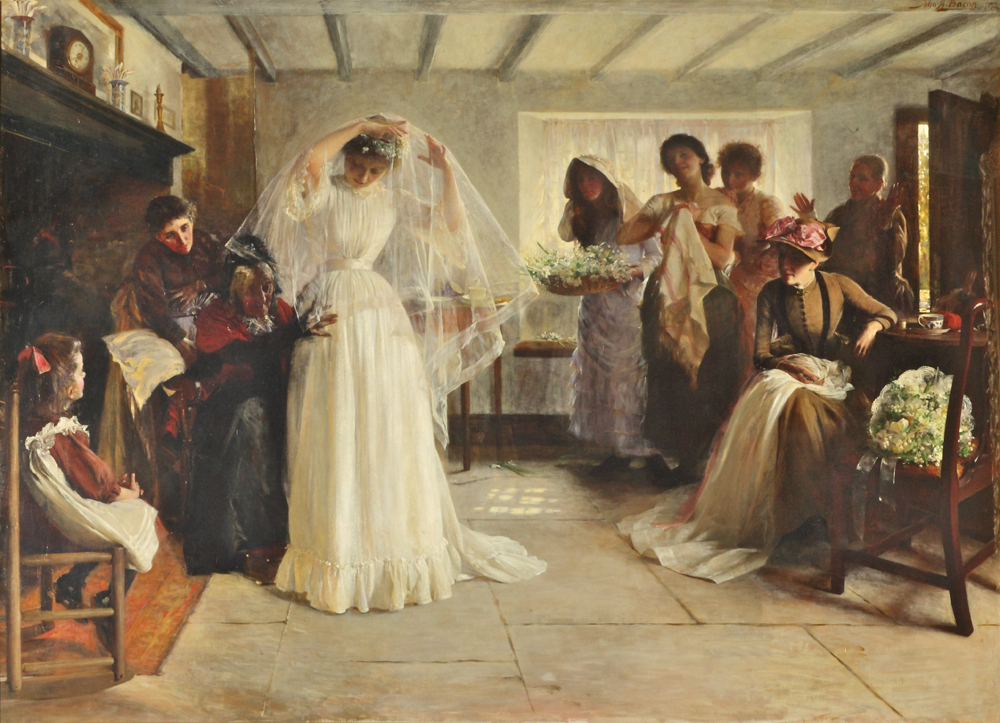
The Wedding Morning (Lady Lever Art Gallery
- Portrait of Michael Lewis Myers, 1906 (Tate Britain)

== Illustrated books (selected) ==
- Harden, Beatrice. Things Will Take a Turn (1894)
- Clarke, H. The Ravensworth Scholarship (1895)
- Craik, Mrs. John Halifax, Gentleman (1899)
- Dickens, Charles. Dombey and Son and Little Dorrit. (1902)
- Everett-Green, Evelyn. Priscilla (1900)
- Hawthorne, Nathaniel. The Scarlet Letter and the House of the Seven Gables (1904)
- Fitcher, W. H. The King's Empire (1906)
- Hughes, Thomas. Tom Brown's School Days (1906)
- Ebbutt, Maud Isabel. Hero-myths & Legends of the British Race (New York: T.Y. Crowell & Company, 1910).
- Squire, Charles. Celtic Myth and Legend, Poetry & Romance (London: Gresham).
- Dickens, Charles. Little Dorrit (Gresham, 1912)
- Everett-Green, Evelyn. Esther's Charge (1912)
- Nesbit, E. and Doris Ashley. Children's Stories from English History (1914)

== Illustrated periodicals (selected) ==
Black and White, Cassell's Family Magazine, The Girl's Own Paper, The Ludgate Monthly, The Quiver, The Windsor Magazine.
