= Daniel S. Bacon =

American politician and judge

Member of the Michigan House of Representatives from the Monroe County district
- In office January 7, 1839 – April 20, 1839

Personal details
- Born: December 12, 1798 Onondaga County, New York, US
- Died: May 18, 1866 (aged 67) Monroe, Michigan, US
- Party: Whig
- Spouses: Eleanor Sophia Page (m. 1837; d. 1854); Rhoda Wells Pitts (m. 1859)
- Children: Elizabeth Custer

Daniel Stanton Bacon (December 12, 1798 – May 18, 1866) was an American politician and judge. He served as a member of the Michigan House of Representatives. He was the father of Elizabeth Bacon Custer, wife and later widow of General George Armstrong Custer.

== Early life ==
Daniel S. Bacon was born on December 12, 1798, in Onondaga County, New York. Daniel later moved to Michigan, and settled in Monroe, Michigan.

== Career ==
In 1822, Bacon taught school on the River Raisin. Bacon engaged in a number of different businesses with his partner, Levi S. Humphrey. One business Bacon engaged in was being a practicing lawyer.

Bacon served as a member of the Michigan Territorial Council representing the 5th district from 1832 to 1835. Bacon was nominated by the Whig Party for the position of lieutenant governor in August 1837. On November 5, 1838, Bacon was elected a member of the Michigan House of Representatives representing the Monroe County district from January 7, 1839, to April 20, 1839. During his term, he was nominated by the Whigs for the position of speaker of the House, but Kinsley S. Bingham was elected over him. Bacon served as a delegate to the 1839 Whig National Convention. For the 1852 presidential election, Bacon served as a Whig nominee for presidential elector.

Bacon served as a probate judge for a number of years. He also served as president of a bank in Monroe, and as director of the Michigan Southern Railroad Company.

== Personal life ==
Bacon married Eleanor Sophia Page on September 12, 1837 in Grand Rapids, Michigan. Their one surviving child, Elizabeth Bacon, was born on April 8, 1842. She would marry famed General George Armstrong Custer on February 9, 1864. Eleanor died on August 12, 1854. Bacon re-married to Rhoda Wells Pitts on February 23, 1859 in Orange, New Jersey.

== Death ==
Bacon died on May 18, 1866, in Monroe. He was interred at Woodland Cemetery.
