= St Andrew's Church, Raveningham =

Church of St Andrew
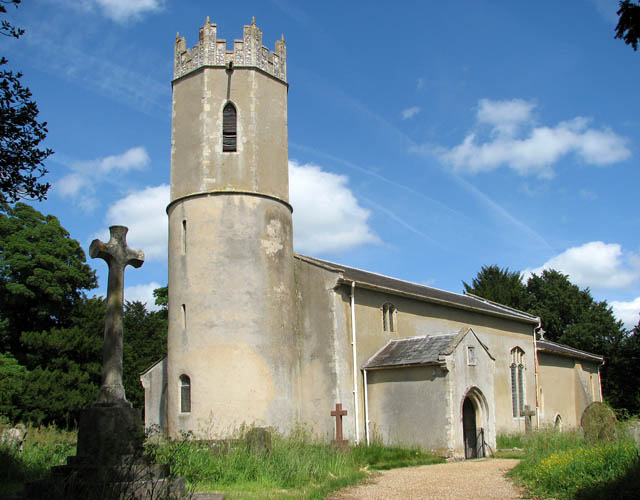
- Church of St Andrew
- 52°30′45.720″N 1°31′56.748″E
- OS grid reference: TM 39788 96399
- Location: Raveningham, Norfolk
- Country: England
- Denomination: Church of England

Architecture
- Heritage designation: Grade II*
- Designated: 5 September 1960

Administration
- Diocese: Norwich

St Andrew's Church is the parish church of Raveningham in Norfolk, England, and in the Diocese of Norwich. It is a round-tower church, dating mostly from the medieval period. The building is Grade II* listed.

== Description ==
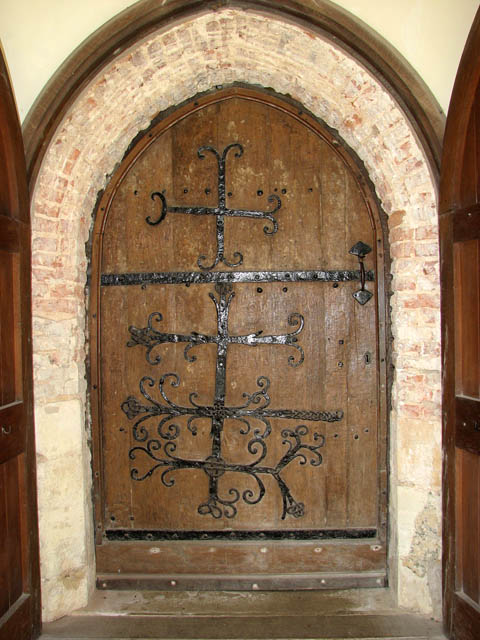
The south door

The manor of Raveningham was held by the Castell (originally de Castello) family from the early 13th century; it passed to the Bacon family on the marriage of Mary Castell to Sir Edmund Bacon, 4th Baronet, of Mildenhall, in the early 18th century.

The church is situated in the grounds of Raveningham Hall. It is built of flint, with a slate roof; the walls are rendered over. The round tower dates from the 12th century, with an octagonal upper part of the 13th century. The south door has fine ironwork of the 12th century, in the form of foliate crosses.

=== Interior ===
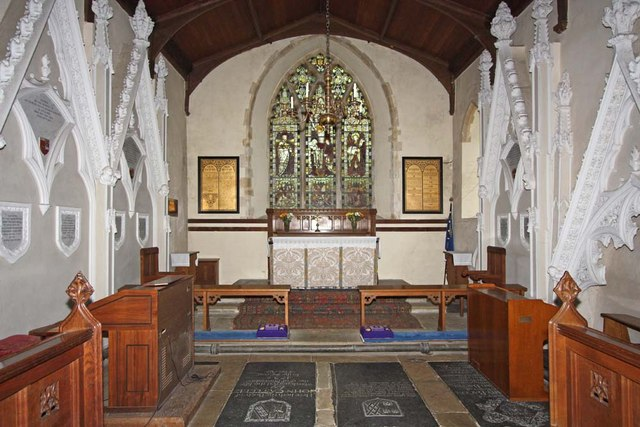
The chancel

The nave, of the 15th century, has a north aisle of four bays, and a wide chancel arch. In the south-west corner of the nave is a marble monument surmounted by an urn, a memorial to Edward Hodge (1782–1815). The 15th-century font is octagonal; the eight panels of the bowl show the Four Evangelists, alternately with their symbols, and around the stem are four seated lions.

The chancel dates from about 1300. Along both sides of the chancel are crocketted triangular arches, framing memorials to members of the Bacon family; the earliest is to Sir Edmund Bacon, 8th and 9th Baronet (1749–1820), who built Raveningham Hall. They are styled from the original in the centre of the south wall, a 14th-century tomb recess sculpted with foliage. On the chancel floor are memorials to members of the Castell and Bacon families including, in the west end of the chancel, a brass to Margaret Castyll (died 1483).
