= Edward Coke, 7th Earl of Leicester =

British nobleman (1936–2015)

The Right Honourable The Earl of Leicester CBE DL

Member of the House of Lords
- Lord Temporal
- In office 19 June 1994 – 11 November 1999 as a hereditary peer
- Preceded by: The 6th Earl of Leicester
- Succeeded by: Seat abolished (Note: Pursuant to the House of Lords Act 1999.)

Personal details
- Born: Edward Douglas Coke; 6 May 1936; Southern Rhodesia (present-day Zimbabwe)
- Died: 25 April 2015 (aged 78); Holkham, Norfolk, England
- Spouses: Valeria Phyllis Potter (m. 1962; div. 1985) Sarah Forde (m. 1986)
- Children: Thomas Coke, 8th Earl of Leicester; Lady Laura Paul; The Hon. Rupert Coke
- Parents: Anthony Coke, 6th Earl of Leicester; Moyra Joan Crossley

Edward Douglas Coke, 7th Earl of Leicester (6 May 1936 – 25 April 2015), styled Viscount Coke between 1976 and 1994, was a British nobleman. The Earl was one of Norfolk's leading figures and played a key role in preserving and modernising the Holkham estate, Holkham Hall, over 40 years.

== Early life ==
Lord Leicester was the son of Anthony Coke, 6th Earl of Leicester, and Moyra Joan Crossley, Countess of Leicester. Born in 1936 in Southern Rhodesia (now Zimbabwe), where his father had settled as a young man before inheriting his title and estate, he spent much of his childhood on a remote farm in South Africa. His grandfather, a younger son of the 3rd Earl of Leicester, had been killed at Gallipoli a week after providing covering fire for the first troop landings, which took place a hundred years to the day before his grandson's death.

== Holkham Hall ==
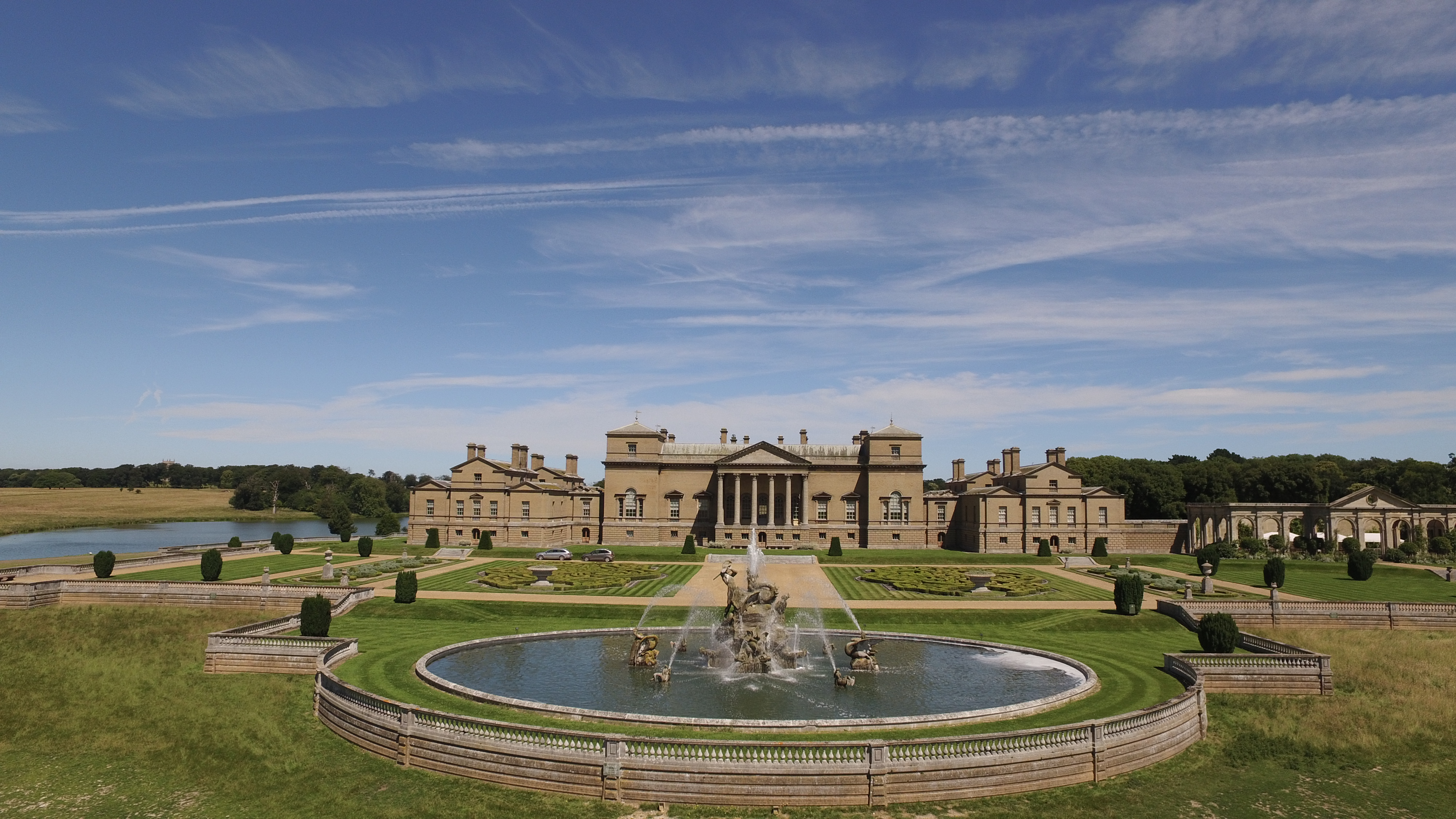
Holkham Hall, Norfolk

By the 1960s, it was clear that Edward Coke's father was next in line to succeed to the Holkham estate, and that he was himself next in line. In 1961, at the age of 25, Coke came to England and settled in the Holkham area to take up farming and familiarise himself with the estate.

By early 1973, Coke had taken over the management of the estate, which had become severely in need of improvement. Of the 300 houses on the estate, only around thirty had bathrooms, the Hall was still heated by open fires, and, as he later said, the Park Farm was possibly the only loss-making farm in the country. This was the start of a lifelong project to modernise farming, the estate's buildings, and the Hall, to ensure a viable legacy for future generations. In 1996 he won the Laurent Perrier Award for Conservation, specifically recognising outstanding conservation work carried out to ensure the sustainability of the grey partridge population.

In 1976, following the death of Thomas Coke, 5th Earl of Leicester, and the decision of his father, now the 6th Earl, to remain in South Africa, he took over full responsibility, as Viscount Coke, for the management of the Holkham estate. Upon the death of his father in 1994, he became the 7th Earl of Leicester and owner of the estate.

The Earl was passionate about the Hall's extensive art collection and was a keen patron of the arts, loaning many paintings to galleries and exhibitions both nationally and internationally. Keenly interested in the history of the Coke family and all aspects of the Hall, he undertook the major task, which lasted 10 years, of restoring the original style of windows that had been destroyed by the insertion of large plate glass panes in the 19th century, and restored as far as possible the original picture hangings.

One of his last initiatives was to suggest a display (now in preparation) in the Hall about Magna Carta and the role played by his ancestor, the great 17th-century lawyer Sir Edward Coke, in preserving its values. With the help of his second wife, Sarah, new vitality was breathed into the Hall by careful repair and refurbishment; open days were transformed by the removal of ropes and the addition of flowers in the staterooms; the Marble Hall hosted classical concerts and staff parties. They deliberately occupied two different wings of the Hall in summer and winter, to maximise the use of the whole house.

== Marriage and children ==
Leicester married Valeria Phyllis Potter, daughter of Leonard A. Potter, on 28 April 1962. They had three children:

- Thomas Edward Coke, 8th Earl of Leicester (6 July 1965); he married Polly Whately on 21 December 1996. They have four children.
- Lady Laura Jane Elizabeth Coke (14 March 1968); she married Jonathan Paul in 1993. They have two sons and one daughter.
- The Honourable Rupert Henry John Coke (1975)

They were divorced in 1985. Leicester married secondly Sarah Forde, daughter of Noel Henry Boys Forde, in 1986, her second marriage. The Countess served as High Sheriff of Norfolk for 2013–2014.

== Positions and offices held ==
Alongside overseeing the management of the estate, the Earl of Leicester found time to play an active role in public life. Amongst the positions and offices he held were leader of the Borough Council of King's Lynn & West Norfolk (1980–1985), chairman of the council's planning committee (1987–1991), an English Heritage Commissioner, trustee of the North Norfolk Historic Building Trust, founder trustee and chairman of the De Montfort University Global Education Trust, trustee of the Royal Anglian Regiment, chairman of the Country Landowners Association, deputy lieutenant of Norfolk, president of the Ancient Monuments Society and president of Wells RNLI. He served as president of the Historic Houses Association (HHA) from 1998 to 2003, in which capacity he was appointed a CBE for services to heritage. He continued his work with the HHA as a patron.

The Earl was an active field sports enthusiast and was proud of Holkham's reputation as the birthplace of driven shooting. Over the years, as a lover of working dogs, he hosted the Kennel Club's Retriever Championships and Spaniel Championships on the Holkham estate. In 1978 he held a country fair in the park to celebrate the 200th anniversary of the Sheep Shearings held by his ancestor, the famous farmer, 'Coke of Norfolk', and it became the first of many such regular events.

== Retirement and later life ==
In October 2005, Lord Leicester retired from the active management of the estate and handed over control to his son, Thomas, Viscount Coke (who is now the 8th Earl). He moved to another property on the estate in 2006, but continued to take a keen interest in the continuing improvement of the Hall, the estate and its buildings.

Lord Leicester died in the early hours of 25 April 2015. He left a widow, Sarah, Countess of Leicester, three children, and seven grandchildren.

== Arms ==
Coat of arms of Edward Coke, 7th Earl of Leicester

Crest
On a chapeau Azure turned up Ermine an ostrich Argent holding in its mouth a horse-shoe.
Escutcheon
Per line Gules and Azure three eagles displayed Argent.
Supporters
On either side an ostrich Argent that on the dexter gorged with a ducal coronet per pale Gules and Azure line reflected over the back of the first that on the sinister gorged with a like coronet per pale Azure and Fules and line reflexed over the back Azure.
Motto
Prudens Qui Patiens (He Is Prudent Who Is Patient)

== Notes ==
Peerage of the United Kingdom
| Preceded by Anthony Coke | Earl of Leicester; 7th creation 1994–2015; Member of the House of Lords (1994–1999) | Succeeded by Thomas Coke |
