= Bacon baronets of Gillingham (1662) =

Extinct baronetcy

The Bacon baronetcy, of Gillingham in the County of Norfolk, was created in the Baronetage of England on 7 February 1662 for Nicholas Bacon. He was the son of Nicholas Bacon, fourth son of the 1st Baronet of the 1611 creation, and brother of the 1st Baronet of the 1627 creation. His two sons, the 2nd and 3rd Baronets, both succeeded in the title. They both died young and the title became extinct on the latter's death in 1685.

== Bacon baronets, of Gillingham (1662) ==
- Sir Nicholas Bacon, 1st Baronet (1623–1666)
- Sir Edmund Bacon, 2nd Baronet (c. 1660–1683)
- Sir Richard Bacon, 3rd Baronet (c. 1663–1685)

== Notes ==
Baronetage of England
Preceded by Duncombe baronets	Bacon baronets of Gillingham; 7 February 1662	Succeeded by Cocks baronets
