= Sir Edmund Bacon, 13th Baronet =

British landowner and businessman (1903–1982)

Bacon in February 1965.

Lieutenant-Colonel Sir Edmund Castell Bacon, 13th and 14th Baronet KG, KBE, KStJ, JP (18 March 1903 – 30 September 1982) was a British landowner and businessman.

== Baronetcy ==
As the Bacon baronetcy of Redgrave in the County of Suffolk is the oldest extant English baronetcy (created in the Baronetage of England on 22 May 1611), Sir Edmund was the Premier Baronet of England.

He was both the 13th and 14th Baronet of Bacon, since the 8th Bacon Baronet of Mildenhall in the County of Suffolk (created in the Baronetage of England on 29 July 1627), had succeeded as the 7th Bacon Baronet of Redgrave in 1755 when his third cousin, the 6th Bacon Baronet of Redgrave, died without heirs.

== Family ==
Sir Edmund was born in 1903 at Raveningham Hall, the son of Sir Nicholas Bacon, 12th Baronet, and Constance Alice Leslie-Melville. He was educated at Wixenford, Eton, and Trinity College, Cambridge.

On 15 January 1936, he married Priscilla Dora Ponsonby (1913–2000), daughter of Sir Charles Ponsonby, 1st Baronet. They had five children. Their daughter Sarah was married to Sir Paul Nicholson.

== Career ==
Sir Edmund was appointed deputy lieutenant of Norfolk in 1939.

He commanded the 55th (Suffolk Yeomanry) Anti-Tank Regiment of the Royal Artillery in the Second World War and he was mentioned in despatches. He became Honorary Colonel of the 308 (Suffolk and Norfolk Yeomanry) Field Regiment, Royal Artillery between 1961 and 1967.

He was appointed as a justice of the peace for Norfolk in 1944. He succeeded to the family baronetcies on 1 January 1947 and he was Lord-Lieutenant of Norfolk between 1949 and 1982. Sir Edmund held several quango and business positions: chairman of British Sugar Corporation (1957–1968); Pro-Chancellor of the University of East Anglia (1964–1973); chairman of the Agricultural North East Development Council (1966–1982) and director of Lloyds Bank.

Sir Edmund died on 30 September 1982, aged 79.

== Awards and decorations ==
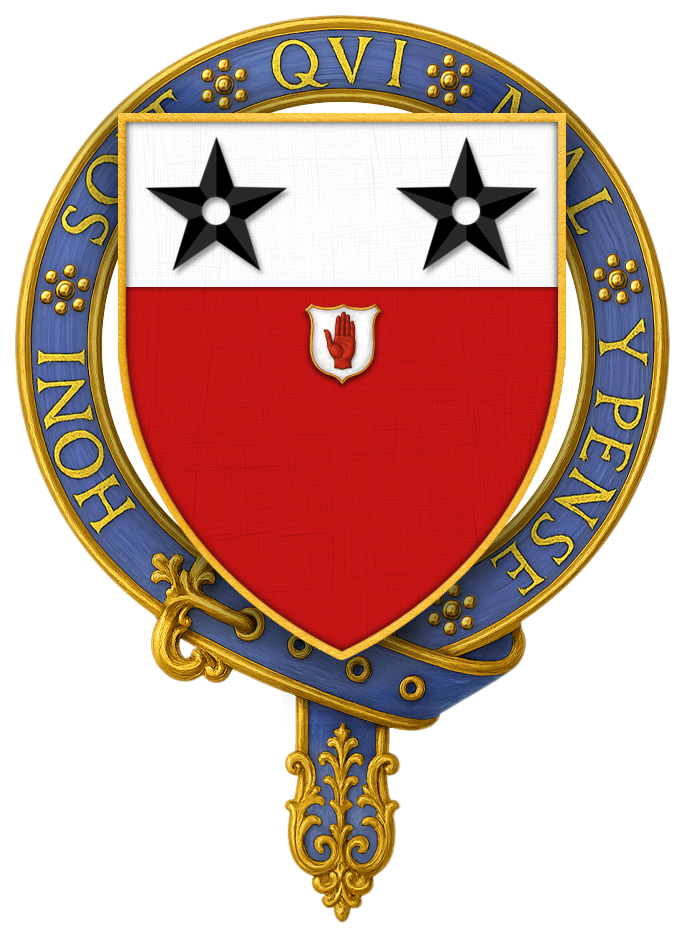
Garter-encircled Arms of Sir Edmund Bacon, 13th Baronet, KG, KBE, KStJ, JP

- Knight of the Venerable Order of Saint John
- Knight Commander of the Order of the British Empire (1965)
- Knight Companion of the Order of the Garter (1970)

Honorary titles
Preceded by The Earl of Leicester	Lord Lieutenant of Norfolk; 1949–1978	Succeeded by Sir Timothy Colman
Academic offices
New post	Pro-Chancellor of the University of East Anglia; 1964–1973	Succeeded by Sir Timothy Colman
Baronetage of England
Preceded by Nicholas Bacon	Baronet of Redgrave; 1947–1982	Succeeded by Nicholas Bacon
Preceded by Nicholas Bacon	Baronet of Mildenhall; 1947–1982	Succeeded by Nicholas Bacon
