= Charles Troughton =

British businessman and barrister (1916 – 1991)

Sir Charles Troughton CBE MC TD
- Born: Charles Hugh Willis Troughton; 27 August 1916; Chalfont St Giles, Amersham, Buckinghamshire
- Died: 13 May 1991 (aged 74)
- Education: Haileybury College; Trinity College, Cambridge
- Occupation: Business executive

Sir Charles Hugh Willis Troughton CBE MC TD (27 August 1916 – 13 May 1991) was a British businessman and barrister who was chairman of W H Smith, director of the Navy, Army and Air Force Institutes, and chairman of the British Council.

== Early life and education ==
Troughton was born in Chalfont St Giles near Amersham, Buckinghamshire, the son of stockbroker Charles Vivian Troughton (1884–1955) and Constance Lilia "Scylla" Tate (1888–1973).

Troughton was educated at Haileybury College (1930–35), followed by Trinity College, Cambridge, where he earned a BA with honours in 1938.

He served with the 4th Battalion of the Oxfordshire and Buckinghamshire Light Infantry (1938–46). He was reported as missing in action in May 1940, while a 2nd Lt. He was captured at the Battle of Cassel on 30 May 1940. As a prisoner of war, No 662, he read for the Bar through the Red Cross from 1943 at OFLAG 7c and was awarded a first. He was liberated on 6 May 1945 . He was discharged from active duty in 1946.

== Career ==
Troughton was director of the retailer W.H. Smith & Son from 1949–77 and chairman (1972–77). He was also director of the Equity & Law Life Assurance Society PLC (1965–77); Thomas Tilling Ltd (1973–79); Barclays Bank (UK) Management (1973–81) and Barclays Bank International (1977–82).

He was chairman of the British Council (1977–84). He was also a director of Times Newspapers Holdings; Whitbread & Co.; and William Collins, Sons.

== Honours ==
Troughton was awarded the Military Cross in 1945. He received the Territorial Efficiency Decoration in 1959, while a captain with the Territorial Army.

Troughton was appointed a Commander of the Order of the British Empire (CBE) in the 1966 New Year Honours and knighted in the 1977 Silver Jubilee and Birthday Honours.

== Personal life ==
In 1947, he married Constance Gillean Mitford, DL, OStJ. They had three sons, Peter, James, and Simon, and one daughter, Katrina. Their eldest son, Peter, a member of the Diplomatic Service, married courtier Sarah Colman, daughter of Sir Timothy Colman.
