= Sarah Troughton =

Lord Lieutenant of Wiltshire

Dame Sarah Troughton DCVO

35th Lord Lieutenant of Wiltshire
- Incumbent
- Assumed office February 2012
- Preceded by: John Barnard Bush

Personal details
- Born: Sarah Rose Colman; 3 May 1953 (age 72) London, England
- Spouse: Peter Troughton (m. 1977)
- Children: 3
- Parent(s): Sir Timothy Colman; Lady Mary Bowes-Lyon
- Occupation: Public service

Dame Sarah Rose Troughton (née Colman; born 3 May 1953) is the Lord Lieutenant of Wiltshire, appointed with effect from February 2012. She is the first woman to hold the position since it was created in the 16th century. A second cousin of King Charles III, for ten years she was lady-in-waiting to Katharine, Duchess of Kent. In 2022, she became one of the six women appointed Queen's companions to Queen Camilla.

== Early life ==
Troughton was born in Paddington in 1953. She is the eldest of the five children of Sir Timothy Colman, a past Lord Lieutenant of Norfolk, and Lady Mary Cecilia Bowes-Lyon, a granddaughter of Claude Bowes-Lyon, 14th Earl of Strathmore and Kinghorne. Her maternal grandfather Michael Bowes-Lyon, who died two days before her birth, was a brother of Queen Elizabeth the Queen Mother, so that she is a second cousin once removed of the present Earl of Strathmore and a first cousin once removed of Queen Elizabeth II. Her ancestor Jeremiah Colman (1777–1851) made a fortune from Colman's mustard, a business which eventually grew into Reckitt & Colman, of which her father was a director until 1989.

== Public life ==
From 1990 to 2000, Troughton was lady-in-waiting to the Duchess of Kent.

Living at Wanborough, near Swindon, she became a trustee of the Community Foundation for Wiltshire and Swindon, a role in which she still serves, and is also President of Community First/Youth Action Wiltshire. She became a Deputy Lieutenant of Wiltshire in 2006. In December 2011, with effect from February 2012, she was promoted to the Lord Lieutenancy. Charles Petty-Fitzmaurice, 9th Marquess of Lansdowne, was her Vice-Lord-Lieutenant until 2016, to be succeeded by Lieutenant-General Sir Roderick Cordy-Simpson (2016–2019), William Wyldbore-Smith (2019–2023) and later Sir Andrew Gregory. In 2011, she was chairman of the Chelsea Physic Garden, but retired from that role in 2020.

As Lord Lieutenant, Troughton's public duties include overseeing arrangements for visits to Wiltshire by members of the Royal Family and escorting royal visitors; representing the King at events and presenting awards and medals on his behalf; liaising with the Wiltshire units of the Royal Navy, Army and Royal Air Force; leading the local magistracy as chairman of the Lord Chancellor's Advisory Committee on Justices of the Peace; and advising on nominations for national honours.

In January 2013, Troughton was appointed a Commander of the Order of St John by the Queen, and advanced to Dame of Grace of the order in 2021.

In 2022, she was one of the first six women appointed as "Queen's companions" (replacing the traditional ladies-in-waiting) to Queen Camilla. A BBC News article described Troughton as one of Camilla's longstanding personal friends.

Troughton was appointed a Dame Commander of the Royal Victorian Order in the 2025 New Year Honours.

== Personal life ==
In 1977 she married Peter Troughton (born 1948), a member of HM Diplomatic Service, and the eldest son of Sir Charles Troughton, chairman of W H Smith. They have a son and two daughters. Her grandson, Nicholas Barclay, son of her daughter Rose, was a page of honour at the coronation of King Charles III. Her husband was later a director of the Lowland Investment Company PLC in the City of London, a trustee of the Royal Collection and Pro-Chancellor of the University of Bath. He is now a trustee of the Rothschild Foundation and a member of the Salisbury Diocesan Board of Finance.

== Honours ==
Ribbon bar of Sarah Troughton

Country	Date	Appointment	Ribbon	Post-nominal letters	Notes
United Kingdom	6 February 2012	Queen Elizabeth II Diamond Jubilee Medal			
International	15 January 2013	Commander of the Order of St John		CStJ	Advanced to DStJ in 2021
United Kingdom	6 February 2022	Queen Elizabeth II Platinum Jubilee Medal			
International	22 April 2021	Dame of Grace of the Order of St John		DStJ	
United Kingdom	6 May 2023	King Charles III Coronation Medal			
International		Service Medal of the Order of St John			
United Kingdom	1 January 2025	Dame Commander of the Royal Victorian Order		DCVO	

== Notes ==
Preceded by John Barnard Bush	Lord Lieutenant of Wiltshire; 2012–present	Incumbent
