= Bacon baronets of Redgrave (1611) =

Baronetcy

Bacon baronets, of Redgrave
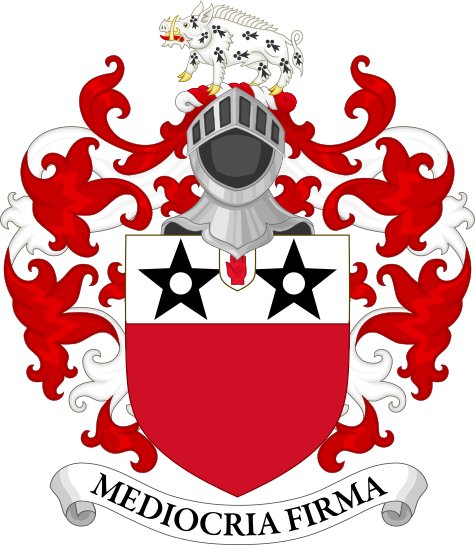
- Escutcheon of the Bacon baronets of Redgrave
- Status: extant
- Motto: Mediocria firma (Moderation is stable)
- Arms: Gules on a Chief Argent two Mullets pierced Sable
- Crest: A Boar passant Ermine

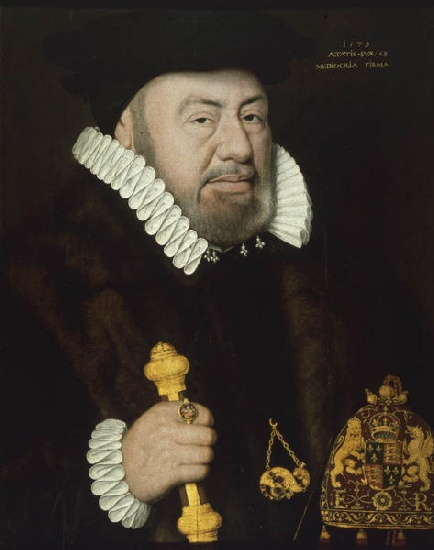
Sir Nicholas Bacon (1509–1579), ancestor of the Bacon family

The Bacon baronetcy, of Redgrave in the County of Suffolk, is the premier baronetcy in the Baronetage of England, which was created on 22 May 1611 for Nicholas Bacon, Member of Parliament for Beverley and Suffolk, and the eldest son of Sir Nicholas Bacon, a prominent Elizabethan politician. The philosopher and statesman Francis Bacon was his half-brother. Bacon was the first person to be created a baronet. As the baronetcy is the oldest extant English baronetcy, the holder is considered the Premier Baronet of England. Bacon's second son Butts Bacon was created a baronet, of Mildenhall, in his own right in 1627 .

Bacon was succeeded by his eldest son, Edmund, the 2nd Baronet. He represented Eye and Norfolk in the House of Commons. He died childless and was succeeded by his younger brother, Robert, the 3rd Baronet. On his death, the title passed to his grandson, Edmund, the 4th Baronet. He served as High Sheriff of Suffolk from 1665 to 1666. He died without surviving male issue and was succeeded by his first cousin, Robert, the 5th Baronet. He was the son of Butts Bacon, younger son of the 4th Baronet. When he died, the title passed to his son, Edmund, the 6th Baronet. He sat as Member of Parliament for Thetford and Norfolk. He had no sons and on his death in 1755, the line of the 2nd Baronet failed.

The late Baronet was succeeded by his third cousin once removed, Sir Richard Bacon, 8th Baronet, of Mildenhall, great-great-grandson of the aforementioned Sir Butts Bacon, 1st Baronet, of Mildenhall, second son of the 1st Baronet of Redgrave. He died without surviving issue and was succeeded by his nephew, Edmund, the 8th/9th Baronet. He was the son of the 4th Baronet of Mildenhall by his second wife Mary Castell. His elder son, Edmund, the 9th/10th Baronet, died without surviving male issue in 1864. He was succeeded by his nephew, Henry, the 10th/11th Baronet. He was the son of Nicholas Bacon, younger son of the 8th/9th Baronet. Bacon was High Sheriff of Lincolnshire in 1867. His elder son, Hickman, the 11th/12th Baronet, was High Sheriff of Lincolnshire in 1887 and a justice of the peace and Deputy Lieutenant of the county. He never married and was succeeded by his younger brother, Nicholas, the 12th/13th Baronet. He was High Sheriff of Norfolk in 1895, a justice of the peace and Deputy Lieutenant for the county and Chairman of the Lindsey County Council. He was succeeded by his only son, Edmund, the 13th/14th Baronet. He was a soldier, businessman, public servant and Lord-Lieutenant of Norfolk. In 1970 he was made a Knight of the Garter. As of 2026 the titles are held by his only son, the 14th/15th Baronet, who succeeded in 1982.

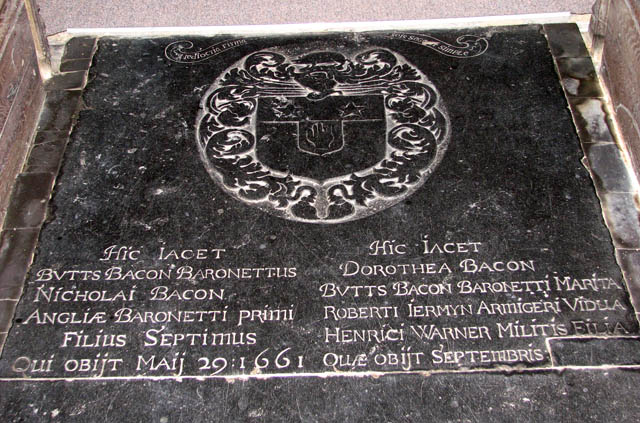
Ledger stone of Sir Butts Bacon, 1st Baronet (of Mildenhall), inscribed in Latin (translated): "Here lies Butts Bacon, Baronet, seventh (septimus) son of Nicholas Bacon, Premier Baronet of England, who died on 29 May 1661". St Mary's Church, Blundeston, Suffolk

== Family seat ==
Redgrave Manor, the former family seat in Suffolk, was bought by the elder Sir Nicholas Bacon from Henry VIII in 1542 and substantially restored between 1545 and 1554. It was the seat of the Bacon family until debts forced the fifth Baronet, Sir Robert Bacon, to sell the estate in 1702 to Sir John Holt.

== Bacon baronets, of Redgrave (1611) ==
- Sir Nicholas Bacon, 1st Baronet (c. 1540–1624)
- Sir Edmund Bacon, 2nd Baronet (c. 1570–1649)
- Sir Robert Bacon, 3rd Baronet (d. 1655)
- Sir Edmund Bacon, 4th Baronet (d. 1685)
- Sir Robert Bacon, 5th Baronet (d. 1704)
- Sir Edmund Bacon, 6th Baronet (c. 1680–1755)
- Sir Richard Bacon, 7th Baronet (Redgrave), 8th Baronet (Mildenhall) (1695–1773)
- Sir Edmund Bacon, 8th Baronet (Redgrave), 9th Baronet (Mildenhall) (1749–1820)
- Sir Edmund Bacon, 9th Baronet (Redgrave), 10th Baronet (Mildenhall) (1779–1864)
- Sir Henry Hickman Bacon, 10th Baronet (Redgrave), 11th Baronet (Mildenhall) (1820–1872)
- Sir Hickman Beckett Bacon, 11th Baronet (Redgrave), 12th Baronet (Mildenhall), QC (1855–1945)
- Sir Nicholas Henry Bacon, 12th Baronet (Redgrave), 13th Baronet (Mildenhall) (1857–1947)
- Sir Edmund Castell Bacon, 13th Baronet (Redgrave), 14th Baronet (Mildenhall) (1903–1982)
- Sir Nicholas Hickman Ponsonby Bacon, 14th Baronet (Redgrave), 15th Baronet (Mildenhall) (b. 1953)

The heir apparent is the present holder's eldest son Henry Hickman Bacon (b. 1984).

Line of succession (simplified)
- Sir Nicholas Bacon, 1st Baronet of Redgrave (c. 1540–1624)
  - Sir Butts Bacon, 1st Baronet of Mildenhall (1580–1661)
    - Sir Henry Bacon, 2nd Baronet of Mildenhall (1615–1670)
      - Sir Henry Bacon, 3rd Baronet of Mildenhall (d. 1686)
        - Sir Edmund Bacon, 4th Baronet of Mildenhall (1672–1721)
          - Castell Bacon (1713–1770)
            - Sir Edmund Bacon, 8th Baronet of Redgrave and 9th Baronet of Mildenhall (1749–1820)
              - Nicholas Bacon (1786–1863)
                - Sir Henry Bacon, 10th Baronet of Redgrave and 11th Baronet of Mildenhall (1820–1872)
                  - Sir Nicholas Bacon, 12th Baronet of Redgrave and 13th Baronet of Mildenhall (1857–1947)
                    - Sir Edmund Bacon, 13th Baronet of Redgrave and 14th Baronet of Mildenhall (1903–1982)
                      - Sir Nicholas Bacon, 14th Baronet of Redgrave and 15th Baronet of Mildenhall (born 1953)
                        - (1). Henry Hickman Bacon (born 1984)
                          - (2). Nicholas Hickman Randall Bacon (born 2019)
                        - (3). Edmund Anthony Bacon (born 1986)
                        - (4). Nathaniel John Walter Bacon (born 1989)
                        - (5). Thomas Castell Bacon (born 1992)
                          - (6). George Castell Bacon (born 2023)
                  - Thomas Walter Bacon (1863–1950)
                    - Anthony Walter Bacon (1902–1999)
                      - Christopher Nicholas Bacon (1945–2018)
                        - male issue and descendants in remainder
                    - Francis Thomas Bacon (1904–1992)
                      - male issue and descendants in remainder
                    - Christopher Henry Bacon (1906–1956)
                      - male issue and descendants in remainder
                - Francis Bacon (1824–1882)
                  - Reginald Cazalet Bacon (1861–1927)
                    - Francis Rimington Bacon (1891–1947)
                      - Anthony Peter Coats Bacon (1924–2020)
                        - male issue and descendants in remainder

== Notes ==
Baronetage of England
Preceded by Premier baronetcy	Bacon baronets of Redgrave; 22 May 1611	Succeeded by Molyneux baronets
