= Thomas Coke, 2nd Earl of Leicester =

British peer, born 1822

The Right Honourable The Earl of Leicester KG DL
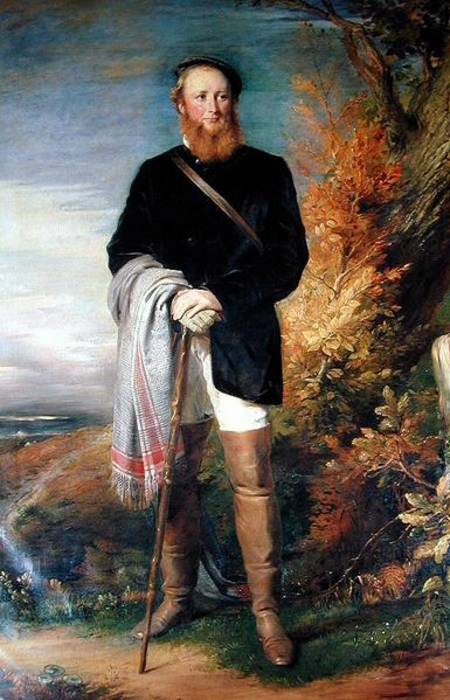
- Coke, by George Richmond, 1858

2nd Earl of Leicester
- In office 30 June 1842 – 24 January 1909
- Preceded by: Thomas Coke
- Succeeded by: Thomas Coke

Chancellor of the Duchy of Cornwall
- In office 1870–1901
- Preceded by: Herbert William Fisher
- Succeeded by: The Earl Spencer

Lord-Lieutenant of Norfolk
- In office 1846–1906
- Preceded by: The Lord Wodehouse
- Succeeded by: Viscount Coke

Personal details
- Born: Thomas William Coke; 26 December 1822
- Died: 24 January 1909 (aged 86)
- Spouse(s): Juliana Whitbread; Hon.Georgiana Cavendish
- Children: Julia Wingfield, Viscountess Powerscourt; Lady Anne Manningham-Buller; Gertrude Murray, Countess of Dunmore; Thomas Coke, 3rd Earl of Leicester; Mary Legge, Countess of Dartmouth; Winifred Clements, Countess of Leitrim; Margaret Strutt, Lady Belper; Mildred Anson, Countess of Lichfield; Hon.Wenman Coke; Hon.Richard Coke; Lady Mabel Luddington; Hon.Edward Coke; Hon.Sir John Spencer Coke; Hon.Reginald Coke; Hon.Henry Coke; Hon.Lovel Coke
- Parent(s): Thomas Coke, 1st Earl of Leicester; Lady Anne Amelia Keppel

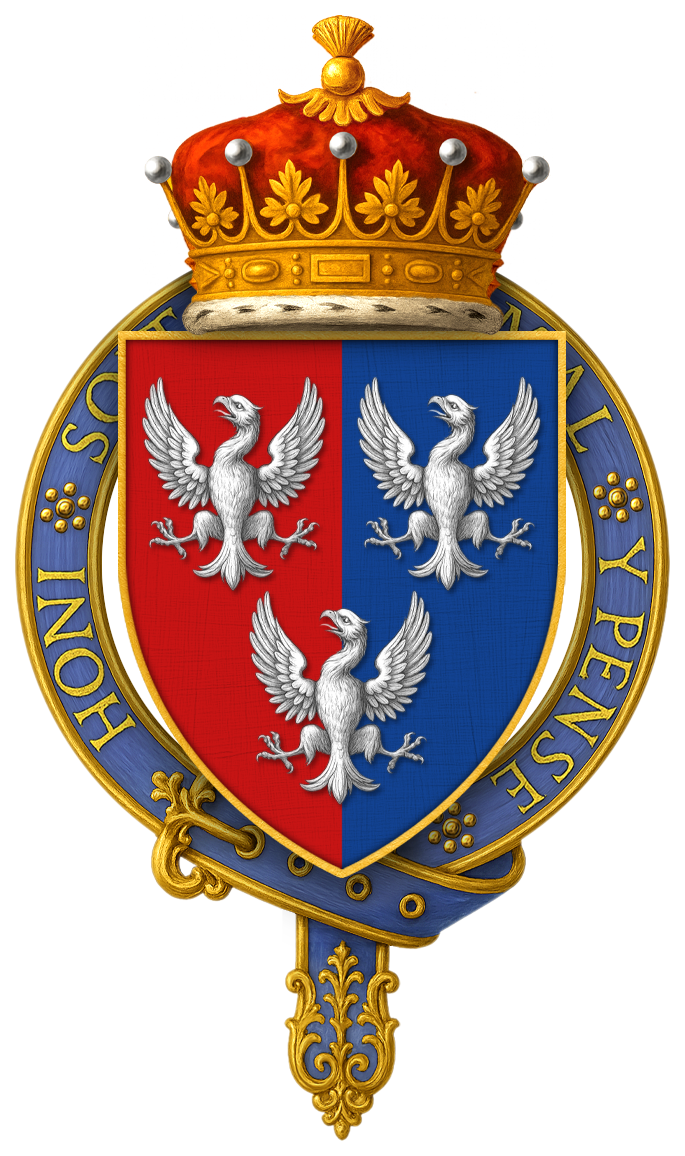
Garter-encircled arms of Thomas Coke, 2nd Earl of Leicester, KG, DL

Thomas William Coke, 2nd Earl of Leicester KG DL (26 December 1822 – 24 January 1909), known as Viscount Coke from 1837 to 1842, was a British peer.

== Background ==
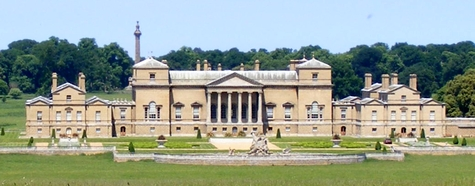
Holkham Hall remains the family seat of the Earls of Leicester.

Leicester was the son of Thomas Coke, 1st Earl of Leicester, by his second wife Lady Anne Amelia Keppel. He succeeded to the earldom and Holkham Hall on his father's death in 1842.

== Public life ==
Lord Leicester served as Lord-Lieutenant of Norfolk from 1846 to 1906 and was a member of the Council of the Duchy of Cornwall and Keeper of the Privy Seal. In 1873 he was made a Knight of the Garter.

== Family ==
Lord Leicester married firstly, Juliana Whitbread (1825–1870), daughter of Samuel Charles Whitbread and Hon. Julia Trevor (d. 1858), on 20 April 1843. They had nine children:

- Lady Julia Coke (1844–1931) she married Mervyn Wingfield, 7th Viscount Powerscourt on 26 April 1864. They have five children. Through their eldest son Mervyn Wingfield, 8th Viscount Powerscourt they are the maternal great-great-grandparents of Sarah Ferguson whose daughter Princess Eugenie of York is wife of Jack Brooksbank.
- Lady Anne Coke (1845 – 23 January 1876), she married Maj.-Gen. Edmund Manningham-Buller (son of Sir Edward Manningham-Buller, 1st Baronet) on 16 January 1874. They have two children.
- Lady Gertrude Coke (1847 – 28 November 1943), she married Charles Murray, 7th Earl of Dunmore on 5 April 1866. They have six children.
- Thomas William Coke, 3rd Earl of Leicester (20 July 1848 – 19 November 1941) he married The Honorable Alice White on 26 August 1879. They have five children. Their eldest daughter Alexandra is the mother of Angus Ogilvy, husband of Princess Alexandra.
- Lady Mary Coke (1849 – 28 December 1929), she married William Legge, 6th Earl of Dartmouth on 18 December 1879. They have five children.
- Lady Winifred Coke (1851 – 22 March 1940), she married Robert Clements, 4th Earl of Leitrim on 2 September 1873. They have eight children.
- Lady Margaret Coke (24 April 1852 – 2 August 1922), she married Henry Strutt, 2nd Baron Belper on 2 May 1874. They have eight children.
- Lady Mildred Coke (1854 – 12 May 1941), she married Thomas Anson, 3rd Earl of Lichfield on 5 November 1878. They have six children.
- Lt.-Col. Wenman Coke (20 November 1855 – 30 May 1931), died unmarried.

Lord Leicester married secondly, Hon. Georgina Cavendish, daughter of William Cavendish, 2nd Baron Chesham, on 26 August 1875. They had six children:

- Major Hon. Richard Coke (20 August 1876 – 14 June 1964), he married Hon. Doreen O'Brien (niece of The Honorable Alice White though her eldest sister) on 21 December 1907 and they were divorced in 1927. They have five children. He remarried Elizabeth Vera Catherine Alice de Beaumont (maternal grandfather Thomas O'Hagan, 1st Baron O'Hagan) on 19 July 1932. They have three children.
- Lady Mabel Coke ( 1878 – 29 January 1967), she married James Luddington on 8 August 1929.
- Lieutenant-Colonel Hon. Edward Coke (17 October 1879 – 4 September 1944), died unmarried.

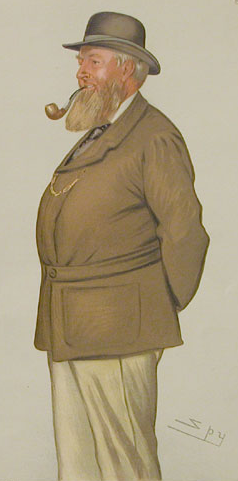
Thomas Coke, second Earl of Leicester, by Leslie Ward, 1883

- Major Hon. Sir John (Jack) Spencer Coke (30 September 1880 – 23 December 1957), he married Hon. Dorothy Lawson (daughter of Harry Lawson, 1st Viscount Burnham) on 15 January 1907. They had three children; Celia, Gerald and Rosemary - later Baroness Hamilton of Dalzell. On 27 November 1951 it was reported that, as her Equerry, Sir Jack had accompanied Queen Mary on a visit to the annual exhibition of the Royal Society of Portrait Painters at the Royal Institute Galleries. He was appointed Knight Commander, Royal Victorian Order in 1953 and was Gentleman Usher to King George VI and Extra Gentleman Usher to Queen Elizabeth II. The Hon. Sir Jack and the Hon. Dorothy Coke are the parents of Celia Brooksbank née Coke (died 1996) who is the grandmother of Jack Brooksbank (husband to Princess Eugenie). In 2018, photos were published which revealed that Sir Jack Coke's daughter - Celia Brooksbank - had been a guest at Hall Barn Estate, the family seat where her great grandfather, Edward Levy-Lawson, 1st Baron Burnham had enjoyed many shooting parties with King Edward VII.
- Captain Hon. Reginald Coke (10 November 1883 – 30 April 1969), he married Katharine Ryder (granddaughter of Henry Ryder, 4th Earl of Harrowby) on 17 July 1924. They have two daughters.
- Hon. Henry Coke ( 1888 – 1892).
- Commander Hon. Lovel William Coke (19 August 1893 – 16 March 1966), died unmarried. Lovel Coke and his eldest sibling Julia Wingfield, Viscountess Powerscourt had a 49-year age difference.

== Ancestry ==
Ancestors of Thomas Coke, 2nd Earl of Leicester

16. Gabriel Roberts
8. Major Philip Roberts
17. Mary Wenman
4. Wenman Coke (born Roberts)
18. Edward Coke
9. Anne Coke
19. Carey Newton
2. Thomas Coke, 1st Earl of Leicester
20. George Chamberlayne of Wardington Manor
10. George Chamberlayne
21. Elizabeth Denton
5. Elizabeth Chamberlayne
22. Rear-Admiral Sir Thomas Hardy
11. Constance Hardy
23. Constance Hook
1. Thomas Coke, 2nd Earl of Leicester
24. Willem van Keppel, 2nd Earl of Albemarle
12. George Keppel, 3rd Earl of Albemarle
25. Lady Anne Lennox
6. William Keppel, 4th Earl of Albemarle
26. Sir John Miller, 4th Baronet
13. Anne Miller
27. Susan Combe
3. Lady Anne Amelia Keppel
28. Edward Southwell Jr.
14. Edward Southwell, 20th Baron de Clifford
29. Hon. Katherine Watson
7. Hon. Elizabeth Southwell
30. Samuel Campbell of Mount Campbell
15. Sophia Campbell
31. Mary Upton

== Notes ==
Honorary titles
Preceded by The Lord Wodehouse	Lord-Lieutenant of Norfolk; 1846–1906	Succeeded by Viscount Coke
Court offices
Preceded by Herbert William Fisher	Chancellor of the Duchy of Cornwall; 1870–1901	Succeeded by The Earl Spencer
Peerage of the United Kingdom
Preceded by Thomas Coke	Earl of Leicester; 1842–1909	Succeeded by Thomas Coke
