= 18th Dragoons =

18th Dragoons may refer to

- 17th Lancers, were designated the "18th Regiment of (Light) Dragoons" between 7 November 1759 and renumbered the 17th in 1761 (during this time they were also known as "Hale's Light Horse")
- 18th Royal Hussars, were renumbered the "18th Regiment of (Light) Dragoons" in 1763, and briefly the title "4th Regiment of Light Dragoons" in 1766 before settling on the 18th in 1769.
