= Raveningham =

Village in Norfolk, England

Coordinates: 52.51915°N 1.53316°E

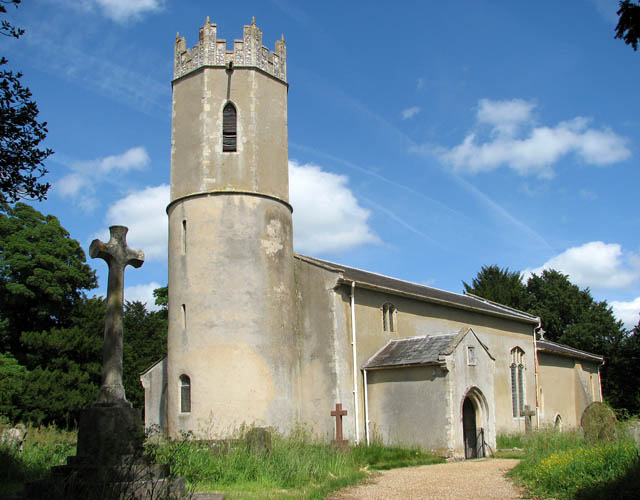
- St Andrew's Church

- Location within Norfolk
- Area: 8.05 km^{2} (3.11 sq mi)
- Population: 162
  - Density: 20/km^{2} (52/sq mi)
- OS grid reference: TM398971
- Civil parish: Raveningham
- District: South Norfolk
- Shire county: Norfolk
- Region: East
- Country: England
- Sovereign state: United Kingdom
- Post town: NORWICH
- Postcode district: NR14
- Police: Norfolk
- Fire: Norfolk
- Ambulance: East of England

Raveningham (/ˈrænɪŋəm/) is a small village and parish in the county of Norfolk, England, about 13 miles (21 km) south-east of Norwich. It covers an area of 1,990 acres (810 ha) and had a population of 157 in 61 households at the 2001 census, the population increasing to 162 at the 2011 census.

== Toponymy and pronunciation ==
The village derives its name from the Old English word Hræfn (meaning "raven"). Historically, the village name translates to the "home of Hraefn's people."

The name may be pronounced: "Ran-ing'm", "Raningham", or "Ranningham".

== History ==
Raveningham is mentioned in the Domesday Book of 1086 as one of the settlements in Clavering hundred.

Raveningham Hall is the home of Sir Nicholas and Lady Bacon: Raveningham Hall Gardens are open to the public once a year as part of the National Garden Scheme. Located within the premises is St Andrew’s Church, one of 124 existing round-tower churches in Norfolk.

== St Andrew's Church ==
The parish church is St Andrew's and is in the Diocese of Norwich. It is a round-tower church, dating mostly from the medieval period. The building is Grade II* listed.

The east window has glass by Kempe depicting the crucifixion flanked by St Peter and St Andrew.
