= Alice Coke, Countess of Leicester =

Anglo-Irish aristocrat (1855–1936)

The Right Honourable The Countess of Leicester DBE JP
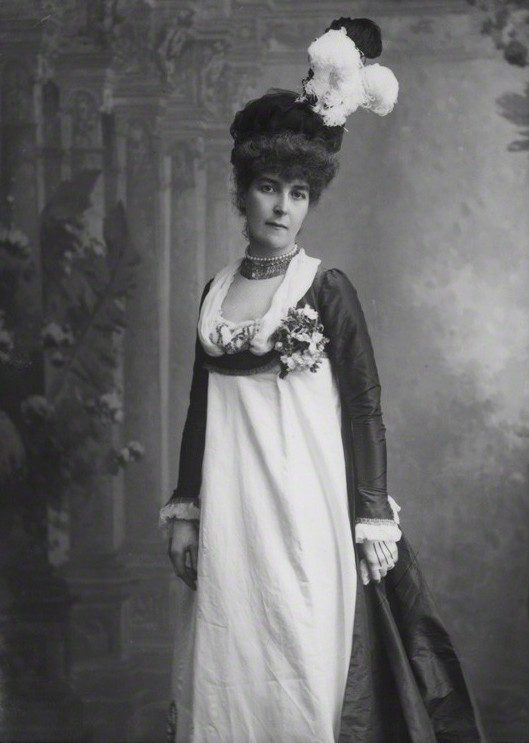
- Photograph by Alexander Bassano, 1879
- Born: Alice Emily White; 29 September 1855
- Died: 24 April 1936 (aged 80); Holkham Hall, Holkham, Norfolk, England

Alice Emily Coke, Countess of Leicester, DBE, JP (née White; 29 September 1855 – 24 April 1936), styled The Honourable Alice White from 1873 to 1879 and Viscountess Coke from 1879 to 1909, was an Anglo-Irish aristocrat active in the British Red Cross during the First World War.

She was the daughter of Sir Luke White, who succeeded as 2nd Baron Annaly in 1873. She married Viscount Coke on 26 August 1879. He succeeded his father as 3rd Earl of Leicester in 1909. The couple had five children, including Thomas Coke, 4th Earl of Leicester.

She was a prominent figure in Norfolk, becoming a justice of the peace in 1922. She was president of the Norfolk Branch of the British Red Cross Society during the War, and was in consequence appointed Dame Commander of the Order of the British Empire (DBE) in the 1920 civilian war honours.

She died at Holkham Hall on 24 April 1936.
