= Molyneux baronets of Sefton (1611) =

Escutcheon of the Molyneux baronets of Sefton

The Molyneux baronetcy, of Sefton in Lancashire was created in the Baronetage of England on 22 May 1611 for Richard Molyneux, Member of Parliament for Lancashire on three occasions 1584 to 1611. His successor was raised to the Peerage of Ireland as Viscount Molyneux, of Maryborough. In 1771, the 9th Viscount became Earl of Sefton.

== Molyneux baronets of Sefton, Lancashire (1611) ==
- Sir Richard Molyneux, 1st Baronet (c.1560–1623)
- Sir Richard Molyneux, 2nd Baronet (1594–1636), created Viscount Molyneux in 1628.

For further succession see Earl of Sefton. The title became extinct on the death of Hugh Molyneux, 7th Earl of Sefton in 1972.

== Notes ==
Baronetage of England
Preceded by Bacon baronets	Molyneux baronets of Sefton; 22 May 1611	Succeeded by Mansel baronets
