= Countrywide Farmers =

British agricultural retailer

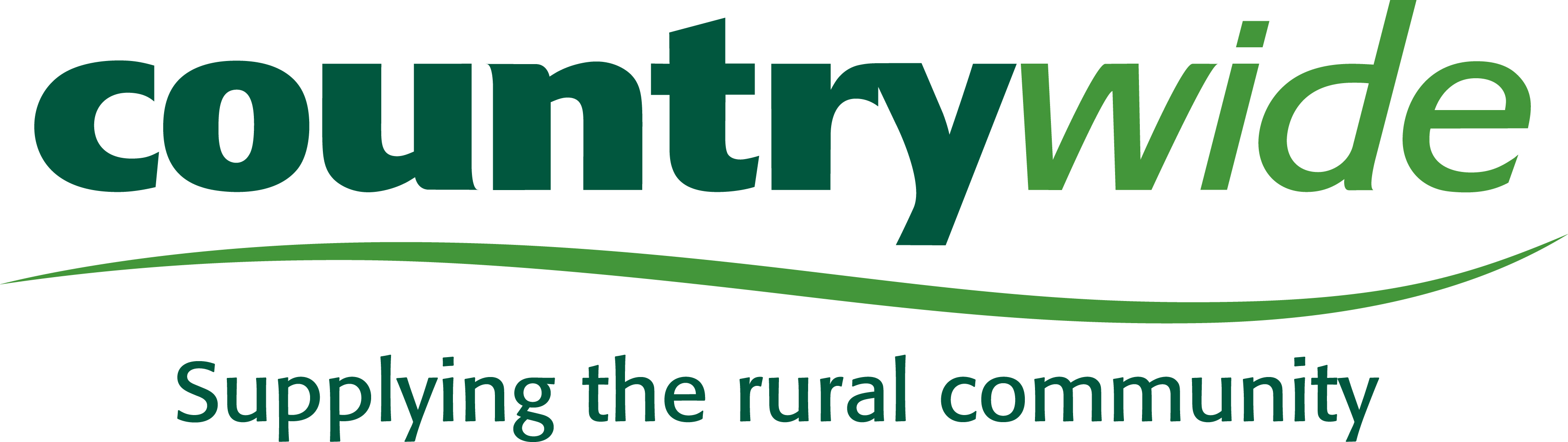
Countrywide Farmers Logo

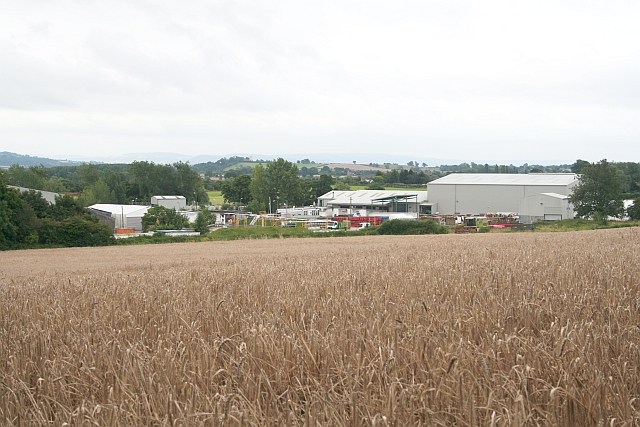
Countrywide Farmers buildings at Defford

Countrywide Farmers was a British agricultural retailer that went out of business in 2018.

The company developed from the amalgamation of a number of agricultural co-operatives such as West Midland Farmers' Association and Midland Shires Farmers. It was demutualised in 1999 when it became Countrywide Farmers plc. The chairman until 2004 was John Barnard Bush.

The new company was based in Evesham, Worcestershire and operated retail stores under the Countrywide brand, which sold equipment and supplies for small-scale agriculture and outdoor pursuits. After 14 unprofitable outlets had been sold in 2017, there were 48 stores when the company entered administration in 2018.

Many of the stores were closed while others were acquired by competitors, eight of them by Wynnstay.
