= Richard Jewson =

British businessman and a former Lord-Lieutenant (born 1944)

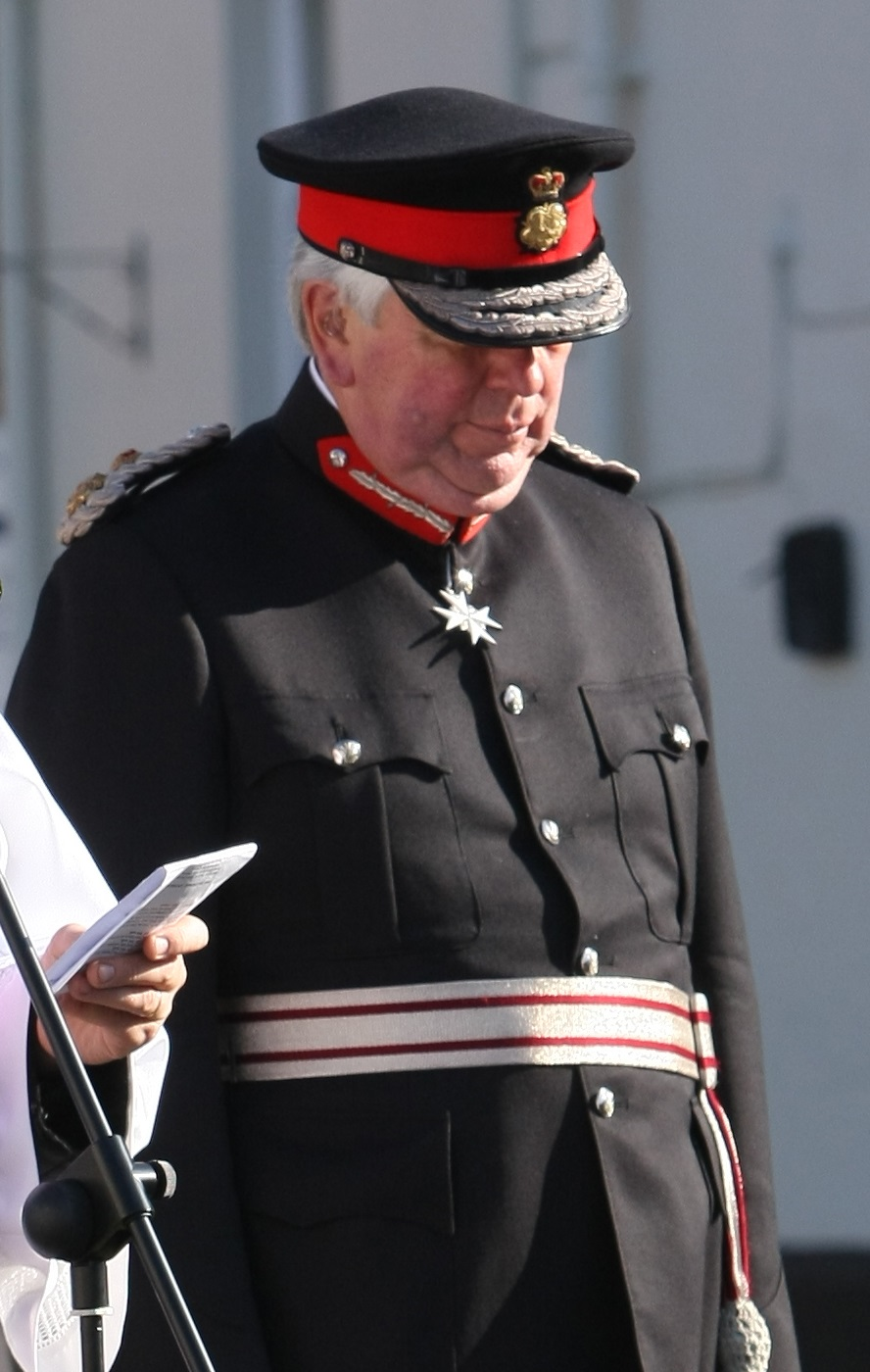
Jewson in 2010

Sir Richard Wilson Jewson, KCVO, CStJ, JP (born 5 August 1944) is a British businessman and a former Lord-Lieutenant of Norfolk.

He was educated at Rugby School and Pembroke College, Cambridge (MA).

He started work in the timber and building material supply industry and became managing director of Jewson. He was then appointed chairman of Jewson's parent company Meyer International plc, retiring in 1993. He has since held chairmanships of Archant (1997–) and Savills PLC (1994–2004). He also previously chaired the Council of the University of East Anglia.

He was appointed High Sheriff of Norfolk for 2000–01 when he lived in Barnham Broom. In 2004, he was appointed Lord-Lieutenant of Norfolk, the representative of the monarch in the county.

He was appointed a Knight Commander of the Royal Victorian Order (KCVO) in the 2019 New Year Honours list 29 December 2018.

In April 2019, he received the Freedom of the Borough from King's Lynn and West Norfolk and Great Yarmouth Borough Councils.

Honorary titles
Preceded by Sir Timothy Colman	Lord Lieutenant of Norfolk; 2004–2019	Succeeded by Lady Dannatt
Academic offices
Preceded by Stuart Holmes	Pro-Chancellor of the University of East Anglia; 2010–2016	Succeeded by Joe Greenwell
