= Anthony Coke, 6th Earl of Leicester =

British peer

The Right Honourable The Earl of Leicester

Member of the House of Lords
- Lord Temporal
- In office 3 September 1976 – 19 June 1994
- Preceded by: The 5th Earl of Leicester
- Succeeded by: The 7th Earl of Leicester

Personal details
- Born: Anthony Louis Lovel Coke; 11 September 1909; London, England
- Died: 19 June 1994 (aged 84); South Africa
- Spouses: Moyra Joan Crossley (m. 1934; div. 1947) Vera Haigh (m. 1947; died 1984) Elizabeth Hope Johnstone (m. 1985)
- Children: Edward Coke, 7th Earl of Leicester; Lady Almary Coke; The Hon. Wenman Coke
- Parents: The Hon. Arthur Coke (father); Phyllis Hermione Drury (mother)

Anthony Louis Lovel Coke, 6th Earl of Leicester (11 September 1909 – 19 June 1994), was a British hereditary peer.

== Background ==
Coke (pronounced Cook) was the son of the Hon. Arthur George Coke and Phyllis Hermione, a daughter of Francis Saxham Elwes Drury (son of The Rev. Henry Drury, Archdeacon of Wilts, and the great-grandson of The Rev. Joseph Drury, D.D., headmaster of Harrow School and teacher of Lord Byron). His father was the second son of Thomas Coke, 3rd Earl of Leicester, and was killed in action in 1915 during the First World War. Anthony Coke was educated at Gresham's School, Holt.

== Career ==
During the Second World War, Coke served in the Royal Air Force. In the late 1950s, he became a Land Development Officer (L.D.O.) in Rhodesia, attached to what was then known as the Native Affairs Department (later renamed the Internal Affairs Department). He and his wife, Vera, were based in the Mondoro Reserve near Hartley, where he was responsible for educating and assisting African farmers.

In 1976 he succeeded his first cousin Thomas as Earl of Leicester, inheriting a substantial estate based on Holkham Hall in Norfolk, but remained living in South Africa, as his eldest son had already taken over the management of the estate.

== Marriages and children ==
Leicester was married firstly on 11 September 1934 to Moyra Joan Crossley, daughter of Douglas Crossley. They had two sons and one daughter together:

- Edward Douglas Coke, 7th Earl of Leicester (born 6 May 1936, died 25 April 2015)
- Lady Almary Bridget Coke (born 18 June 1939)
- Hon. Wenman John Coke (born 24 May 1940)

They were divorced in 1947 in which year Leicester married Vera Haigh in Southern Rhodesia. She died in 1984 and Leicester married thirdly in 1985, Elizabeth Hope Johnstone, daughter of Clifford Arthur Johnstone, of Addo, Eastern Province, South Africa.

Leicester died on 12 August 1994 at age 84 in South Africa. He was succeeded in the earldom and other titles by his son Edward Coke, 7th Earl of Leicester.

Peerage of the United Kingdom
Preceded by Thomas Coke	Earl of Leicester; 7th creation 1976–1994; Member of the House of Lords (1976–1994)	Succeeded by Edward Coke
