= John Barnard Bush =

English farmer and landowner (1937–2024)

John Bush CVO OBE CStJ
- Born: 5 February 1937; Marlborough, Wiltshire, England
- Died: 11 May 2024 (aged 87)

John Barnard Bush CVO OBE CStJ (5 February 1937 – 11 May 2024) was an English farmer, landowner, and Justice of the Peace. He was High Sheriff of Wiltshire for 1997, a Deputy Lieutenant of Wiltshire from 1998, and from 2004 to 2012 was Lord Lieutenant of Wiltshire.

As non-executive chairman of West Midland Farmers Association Ltd, an agricultural co-operative, he oversaw its conversion into Countrywide Farmers PLC.

== Early life ==
The son of Barnard Robert Swanton Bush, of Norton St Philip, Somerset, and of his wife Elizabeth Weeks, Bush was educated at Monkton Combe School and Balliol College, Oxford, where he read philosophy, politics, and economics and graduated BA and MA.

== Career ==
Bush was a career farmer, owning a mixed farm at Heywood, Wiltshire. He was appointed a Justice of the Peace for Wiltshire in 1980 and as a Deputy Lieutenant of Wiltshire in 1998.

From 1995 to 1999 he was non-executive chairman of West Midland Farmers Association Ltd, a regional agricultural co-operative based in Melksham, Wiltshire. He oversaw its demutualisation in 1999 to become Countrywide Farmers PLC, a farming, equestrian and rural supplies firm, continuing as chairman until 2004, shortly before the business moved its base to Upton-upon-Severn. When he retired from the post, Countrywide Farmers had 11,000 farmer shareholders and an annual turnover of £150 million.

Bush served as Chairman of the Bristol Avon Flood Defences Committee from 1981 to 2000 and was a Governor of Lackham College between 1986 and 1998. He was High Sheriff of Wiltshire for 1997–1998, and was appointed a Deputy Lieutenant of the county in 1998. He served as Chairman of the Wiltshire Magistrates' Courts Committee from 2001 to 2005.

In 2004, Bush was appointed Lord Lieutenant of Wiltshire, succeeding Sir Maurice Johnston. He retired in 2012, at the age of seventy-five, to be succeeded by Sarah Rose Troughton, a cousin of the Queen. As Lord Lieutenant, he was also custos rotulorum, and his public duties included overseeing the arrangements for visits to Wiltshire by members of the royal family, representing the Queen at local events, such as presenting awards and medals on her behalf, liaising with the Wiltshire units of the Royal Navy, Army, and Air Force; leading the local magistracy as Chairman of the Lord Chancellor’s Advisory Committee on Justices of the Peace; and advising on nominations for national honours.

Bush was Patron of the Community Foundation for Wiltshire and Swindon, Chairman of Fredericks Wiltshire, and a Trustee of the Devizes Assize Courts Trust. He chaired the Wiltshire Historic Buildings Trust and the Wiltshire Bobby Van Trust and was president of the Salisbury and South Wiltshire branch of the English Speaking Union.

== Honours ==
- 1997–1998: High Sheriff of Wiltshire
- 1998: Deputy Lieutenant of Wiltshire
- 2004: Officer of the Order of the British Empire (OBE) - for services to the community in Wiltshire, 2004 Birthday Honours
- 10 November 2004: Lord Lieutenant of Wiltshire
- 27 July 2005: Commander of the Venerable Order of Saint John (CStJ)
- 1 January 2012: Commander of the Royal Victorian Order (CVO) - 2012 New Year Honours

== Personal life ==
On 30 December 1961, Bush married Pamela Eve Irene Bagwell, the daughter of Lieutenant-Commander William Bagwell RN of Clonmel, County Tipperary and his wife Evelyn Irene Hamilton Wills, the only child of Sir Frederick Wills, 1st Baronet. They had two children, Alexander Hugh Barnard Bush (called Alex, born 4 October 1964) and Carolyn Louise Bush (called Carly, born 18 July 1967). They also had five grandchildren, Morgan, Jasmine, Scarlett, Thomas, and Lucy.

Pamela Bush died in May 2021, and John Barnard Bush died on 11 May 2024, at the age of 87. His funeral took place at Edington Priory on 30 May.

== See also ==
- High Sheriff of Wiltshire
- List of Deputy Lieutenants of Wiltshire

Honorary titles
Preceded by Sir Maurice Johnston	Lord Lieutenant of Wiltshire; 2004–2012	Succeeded by Sarah Rose Troughton
