= Sir Nicholas Bacon, 1st Baronet, of Gillingham =

Sir Nicholas Bacon, 1st Baronet (1623–1666) was an English lawyer, and one of the Bacon baronets. On 18 June 1639, he was admitted to Gray's Inn. On 7 February 1662, he was created 1st Baronet Bacon, of Gillingham in Norfolk, England.

His father, Nicholas Bacon of Gillingham, was the fifth son of Sir Nicholas Bacon, 1st Baronet, of Redgrave; his mother was Nicholas Bacon's second wife, Margaret D'Arcy. He married Elizabeth Freeston.

Baronetage of England
New creation	Baronet (of Gillingham); 1662–1666	Succeeded by Edmund Bacon
