= Edward Hodge =

General Sir Edward Hodge GCB
- Born: 19 April 1810
- Died: 10 December 1894 (aged 84)
- Burial place: Brompton Cemetery, London
- Military career
- Allegiance: United Kingdom
- Branch: British Army
- Rank: General
- Commands: 4th (Royal Irish) Regiment of Dragoon Guards; 5th Dragoon Guards
- Conflicts: Crimean War
- Awards: Knight Grand Cross of the Order of the Bath

General Sir Edward Cooper Hodge GCB (19 April 1810 – 10 December 1894) was a British Army officer.

== Biography ==
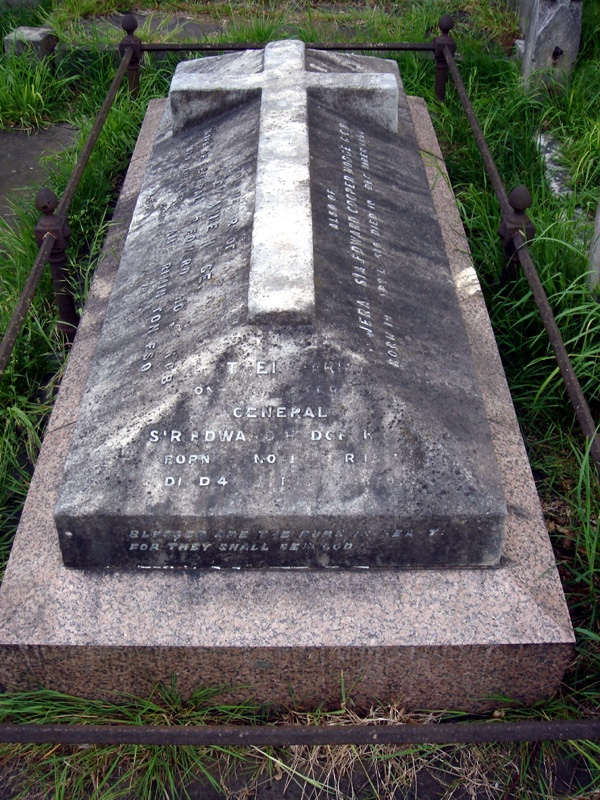
Funerary monument, Brompton Cemetery, London

Hodge was the son of Major Edward Hodge (1782–1815) of the 7th Hussars, who distinguished himself in the Peninsular War and in the Waterloo Campaign.

As a Lieutenant-Colonel, Edward Cooper Hodge commanded the 4th (Royal Irish) Regiment of Dragoon Guards at the Battle of Balaclava. He was subsequently placed in command of the 5th Dragoon Guards, and later rose to the rank of General.

Hodge was the author of a diary, edited by the Marquess of Anglesey and published as Little Hodge: Being Extracts from the Diaries and Letters of Colonel Edward Cooper Hodge Written During the Crimean War, 1854-1856

He is buried in Brompton Cemetery, London.

== Family ==
In 1860 Edward Cooper Hodge married Lucy Anne, second daughter of James Rimingt'on. Esq, of Broomhead Hall, Yorkshire

== Notes ==
Military offices
Preceded by Sir James Chatterton	Colonel of the 4th Royal Irish Dragoon Guards; 1874–1894	Succeeded by William Godfrey Dunham Massy
Preceded by Sir Charles Routledge O'Donnell	Colonel of the 18th Royal Hussars; 1870–1874	Succeeded by Sir Thomas Westropp McMahon
