= Raveningham Hall =

Country house in Norfolk, England

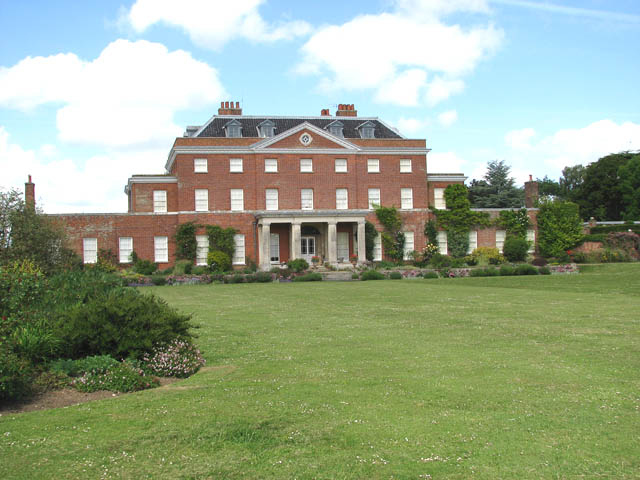

- Location within Norfolk

General information
- Status: Grade II* listed
- Location: Near Norwich, Norfolk grid reference TM 399 965, United Kingdom
- Coordinates: 52°30′48″N 1°32′3″E
- Completed: Late 18th century

Website
- http://raveningham.com/

Raveningham Hall is a country house in Norfolk, England, about 10 miles (16 km) south-east of Norwich. There are 10 acres of gardens, and it has a rural estate of 5,500 acres.

It is home to Sir Nicholas Bacon, 14th and 15th Baronet, and his family.

The hall is a Grade II* listed building, listed on 25 September 1951.

== Hall ==
Raveningham Hall was built in the late 18th century for Sir Edmund Bacon, 8th and 9th Baronet (1749–1820). The architect is unknown. The building is of red brick and has a central portico, of three bays, with Tuscan columns. There was some modification in the early 20th century by the architect Somers Clarke.

St Andrew's Church, the parish church of Raveningham, is situated near the hall.

== Estate ==
There are 10 acres of gardens; this includes a walled kitchen garden, a restored Victorian conservatory, herbaceous borders, wildflower meadows and lawns. As of 2020 it is open throughout the year for pre-booked group tours.

There is a rural estate of 5,500 acres, where there is arable and livestock farming (including Sussex cattle and Norfolk Horn sheep), and 500 acres of semi-ancient natural woodland.

== See also ==
- Bacon baronets
