= Sir Nicholas Bacon, 14th Baronet =

British baronet (born 1953)

Sir Nicholas Hickman Ponsonby Bacon, 14th and 15th Baronet, KCVO, OBE, DL (born 17 May 1953), is a British landowner, businessman and philanthropist. Sir Nicholas is also the Premier Baronet of England.

== Life and education ==
Bacon is the only son of Sir Edmund Bacon, 13th and 14th Baronet, and Priscilla Dora Ponsonby, daughter of Colonel Sir Charles Ponsonby, 1st Baronet.

Educated at Eton College before going up to Dundee University where he graduated as MA, Bacon was then called to the Bar at Gray's Inn. Between 1966 and 1969 he served as Page of Honour to Queen Elizabeth II.

== Family ==
Married to Susan Henrietta Dinnis in 1981, Sir Nicholas and Lady Bacon have four sons:

- Henry Hickman Bacon (b. 23 April 1984)
- Edmund Bacon (b. 1986)
- Nathaniel Bacon (b. 1989)
- Thomas Castell Bacon (b. 1992)

Bacon inherited significant landholdings in Norfolk. Seated at the 18th century Raveningham Hall, he and his wife, Lady Bacon, share an interest in continuing the restoration of the extensive gardens, which were renovated by his late mother, Priscilla.

== Appointments ==
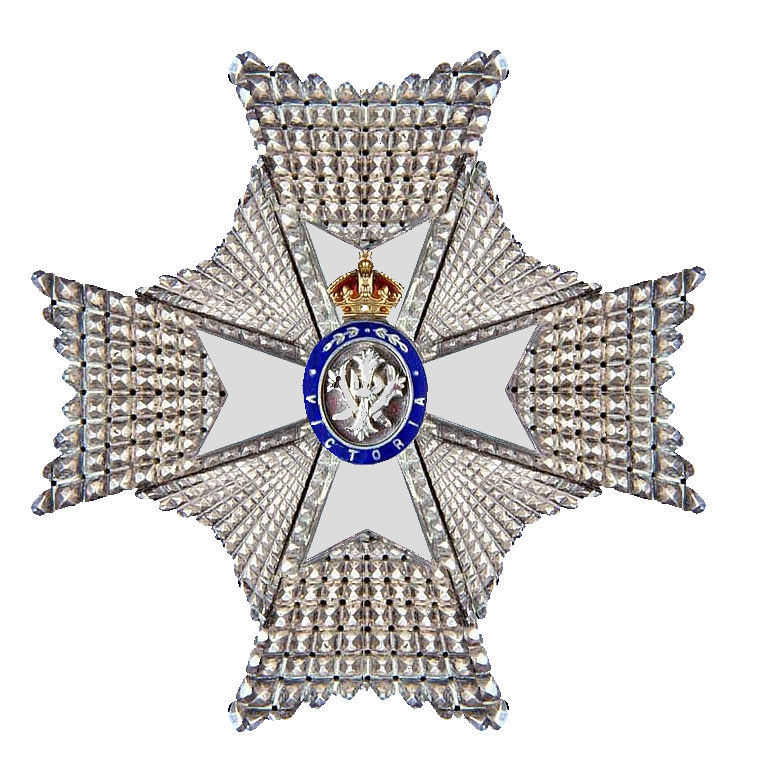
KCVO star

Bacon was President of the Royal Horticultural Society (2013 to 2020) and awarded the society's Elizabeth Medal of Honour in 2025. He was a Council Member of the National Trust, and in 1998 was appointed a Deputy Lieutenant of Norfolk.

In 2005, he was appointed to the Prince's Council of the Duchy of Cornwall and served as High Sheriff of Norfolk. In 2006 he succeeded the 3rd Earl Peel, GCVO, as Lord Warden of the Stannaries and Chairman of the Prince's Council.

He is also President of the Norfolk Beekeepers Association.

Bacon was appointed Officer of the Order of the British Empire (OBE) in the 2010 New Year Honours for services to the community in Norfolk and Knight Commander of the Royal Victorian Order (KCVO) in the 2023 New Year Honours for his services as Lord Warden of the Stannaries. In March 2023, he was appointed an Extra Equerry to King Charles III.

== Baronetcy ==
Bacon inherited the Bacon baronetcy upon the death of his father in 1982.

As the Bacon baronetcy, of Redgrave in the County of Suffolk, is the oldest extant English baronetcy (created in the Baronetage of England on 22 May 1611), Sir Nicholas is considered the Premier Baronet of England.

Bacon is both the 14th and 15th holder of the Bacon baronetcies since the 8th Bacon Baronet of Mildenhall in the County of Suffolk (created in the Baronetage of England on 29 July 1627), additionally succeeded as the 7th Bacon Baronet of Redgrave in 1755 when his third cousin, the 6th Bacon Baronet of Redgrave, died without heirs.

Arms of Bacon: Gules, on a chief argent two mullets pierced sable

== Ancestry ==
Ancestors of Sir Nicholas Bacon, 14th Baronet

16. Nicholas Bacon
8. Sir Henry Bacon, 10th Baronet of Redgrave
17. Jane Bowker
4. Sir Nicholas Bacon, 12th Baronet of Redgrave
18. Sir Thomas Beckett, 3rd Baronet of Leeds
9. Elizabeth Beckett
19. Caroline Beckett
2. Sir Edmund Bacon, 13th Baronet of Redgrave
20. The Hon. Alexander Leslie-Melville
10. Alexander Samuel Leslie-Melville
21. Charlotte Smith
5. Constance Alice Leslie-Melville
22. Charles Brodrick, 6th Viscount Midleton
11. The Hon. Albina Brodrick
23. The Hon. Emma Stapleton
1. Sir Nicholas Bacon, 14th Baronet of Redgrave
24. Charles Ponsonby, 2nd Baron de Mauley
12. The Hon. Edwin Ponsonby
25. Lady Maria Ponsonby
6. Sir Charles Ponsonby, 1st Baronet
26. Octavius Edward Coope
13. Emily Dora Coope
27. Emily Fulcher
3. Priscilla Dora Ponsonby
28. Hucks Gibbs, 1st Baron Aldenham
14. Herbert Gibbs, 1st Baron Hunsdon of Hunsdon
29. Louisa Anne Adams
7. The Hon. Winifred Marian Gibbs
30. Richard Durrant
15. Anna Maria Durrant
31. Charlotte Still Dashwood

== See also ==
• Bacon baronets

Court offices
Preceded by Edward Hay	Page of Honour; 1969–1973	Succeeded by Hon. George Herbert
Preceded by The Earl Peel	Lord Warden of the Stannaries; 2005–2022	Succeeded by Hugo van Vredenburch
Baronetage of England
Preceded by Sir Edmund Bacon	Baronet of Redgrave; 1982–present	Incumbent; Heir apparent: Henry Bacon
Preceded by Sir Edmund Bacon	Baronet of Mildenhall; 1982–present	Incumbent; Heir apparent: Henry Bacon
