= Thomas Coke, 4th Earl of Leicester =

British peer and army officer (1880–1949)

The Right Honourable The Earl of Leicester KStJ DL JP
- Arms of Coke, Earls of Leicester: Per pale gules and azure, three eagles displayed argent.

Member of the House of Lords
- Lord Temporal
- In office 19 November 1941 – 21 August 1949
- Preceded by: The 3rd Earl of Leicester
- Succeeded by: The 5th Earl of Leicester

Personal details
- Born: Thomas William Coke; 9 July 1880
- Died: 21 August 1949 (aged 60)

Thomas William Coke, 4th Earl of Leicester (9 July 1880 – 21 August 1949), styled Viscount Coke from 1909 to 1941, was a British Army officer and hereditary peer.

== Early life ==
Coke was the son of Thomas William Coke, 3rd Earl of Leicester, and Hon. Alice Emily White. Educated at Eton and Sandhurst, he entered the Scots Guards as a cadet, and was promoted to second lieutenant on 21 February 1900.

== Military career ==
Coke was seconded for service in the Second Boer War in South Africa on 26 November 1901, and was promoted to lieutenant on 10 January 1902. Following the end of the war in June 1902 he returned with most of the men of the guards regiments on board the SS Lake Michigan, which arrived in Southampton in October 1902. He went on half-pay on 13 April 1905 due to illness, but returned to service on 8 November 1905.

Coke was promoted to captain on 14 March 1906. He resigned his commission on 6 March 1909, after his father succeeded to the earldom and he became heir apparent; his uncle John, then a lieutenant in the Guards, was promoted captain in his place. On 1 October 1909, he was commissioned a lieutenant in the Norfolk Yeomanry. Made a captain in the General Reserve of Officers on 4 June 1911, he surrendered his commission in the General Reserve on 10 July 1912 to return to the Scots Guards as a captain. He served with the Guards for the duration of the First World War. On 1 May 1917 he was appointed an aide-de-camp.

== Later life ==
Coke was also a Knight of the Order of St. John, and a Justice of the Peace for Norfolk. He was a talented violinist. He succeeded his father as Earl of Leicester in 1941 and was appointed Lord Lieutenant of Norfolk in 1944. He died in 1949 and was succeeded by his elder son Thomas.

A recording that his daughter, Lady Silvia, made at the age of 90 recounting the history of Holkham Hall is a British Library exemplar of the conservative received pronunciation accent of English.

== Family ==
Leicester was married on 2 December 1905 to Marion Gertrude Trefusis, daughter of Colonel the Hon. Walter Trefusis and Lady Mary Montagu-Douglas-Scott. (Colonel Trefusis was the son of the 19th Lord Clinton and Lady Mary was the daughter of the 5th Duke of Buccleuch). They had five children:

- Hon. Angela Mary Coke (born 6 November 1906, died December 1906)
- Major Thomas William Edward Coke, 5th Earl of Leicester (born 16 May 1908, died 3 September 1976)
- Lady Silvia Beatrice Coke (born 19 October 1909, died October 2005)
- Hon. David Arthur Coke (born 4 December 1915, killed in action 9 December 1941)
- Lady Katharine Mary Coke (7 March 1920 – 6 October 1993); Woman of the Bedchamber to Queen Elizabeth The Queen Mother.

The Trefusis connection reverberated in a later generation. The eldest daughter of the 5th Earl became engaged to Johnnie Althorp, later father to Diana, Princess of Wales; his father objected to the match on the grounds of "mad blood", a reference to the institutionalised relatives of the queen, and the engagement was broken off. (Much later, the director of the Murdoch Children's Research Institute thought that a genetic disease in the Hepburn-Stuart-Forbes-Trefusis family may have killed male members of the family in early childhood and caused learning disabilities in females.) She went on to marry the aristocrat and entrepreneur Colin Tennant and is known as Anne Tennant, Baroness Glenconner.

== Honours ==
- - Knight of Justice of the Order of St John (K.StJ).
- - Queen's South Africa Medal.
- - 1914–15 Star.
- - British War Medal.
- - WWI Victory Medal.
- Deputy lieutenant (DL) of Norfolk.
- Lord Lieutenant of Norfolk (1944–1949).
- Justice of the Peace (JP) for Norfolk.

Honorary titles
Preceded by Russell James Colman	Lord Lieutenant of Norfolk; 1944–1949	Succeeded by Sir Edmund Bacon
Peerage of the United Kingdom
Preceded by Thomas Coke	Earl of Leicester; 1941–1949; Member of the House of Lords (1941–1949)	Succeeded by Thomas Coke
