= 18th Royal Hussars =

British Army cavalry regiment

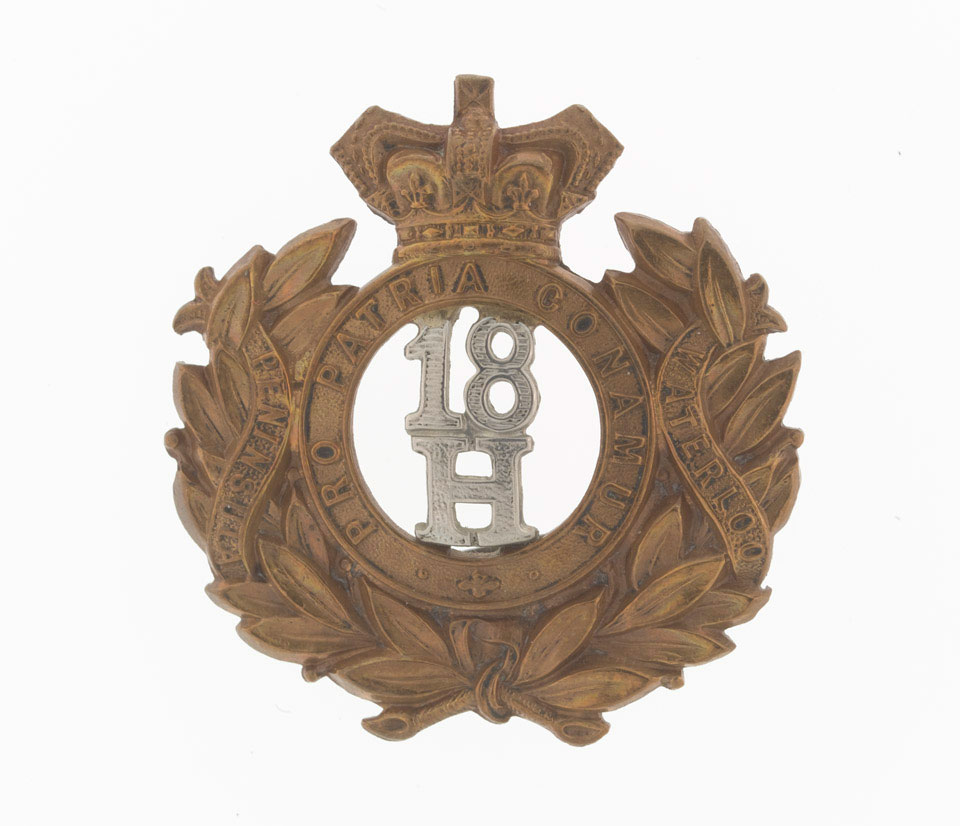
- c. 1900 regimental cap badge for other ranks
- Active: 1759–1821; 1858–1922
- Allegiance: Great Britain (1759–1800); United Kingdom (1801–1922)
- Branch: British Army
- Type: Cavalry
- Role: Light cavalry
- Size: Regiment
- Nicknames: The Young 15th The Drogheda Light Horse
- Mottos: Pro rege, pro lege, pro patria conamur (For King, for Law, for Country we strive)

Commanders
- Notable commanders: Field Marshal Charles Moore, 1st Marquess of Drogheda; General Sir Edward Hodge

The 18th Royal Hussars was a cavalry regiment of the British Army raised in 1759. It saw service for two centuries, including the First World War before being amalgamated with the 13th Hussars to form the 13th/18th Royal Hussars in 1922.

== History ==
=== Early history ===
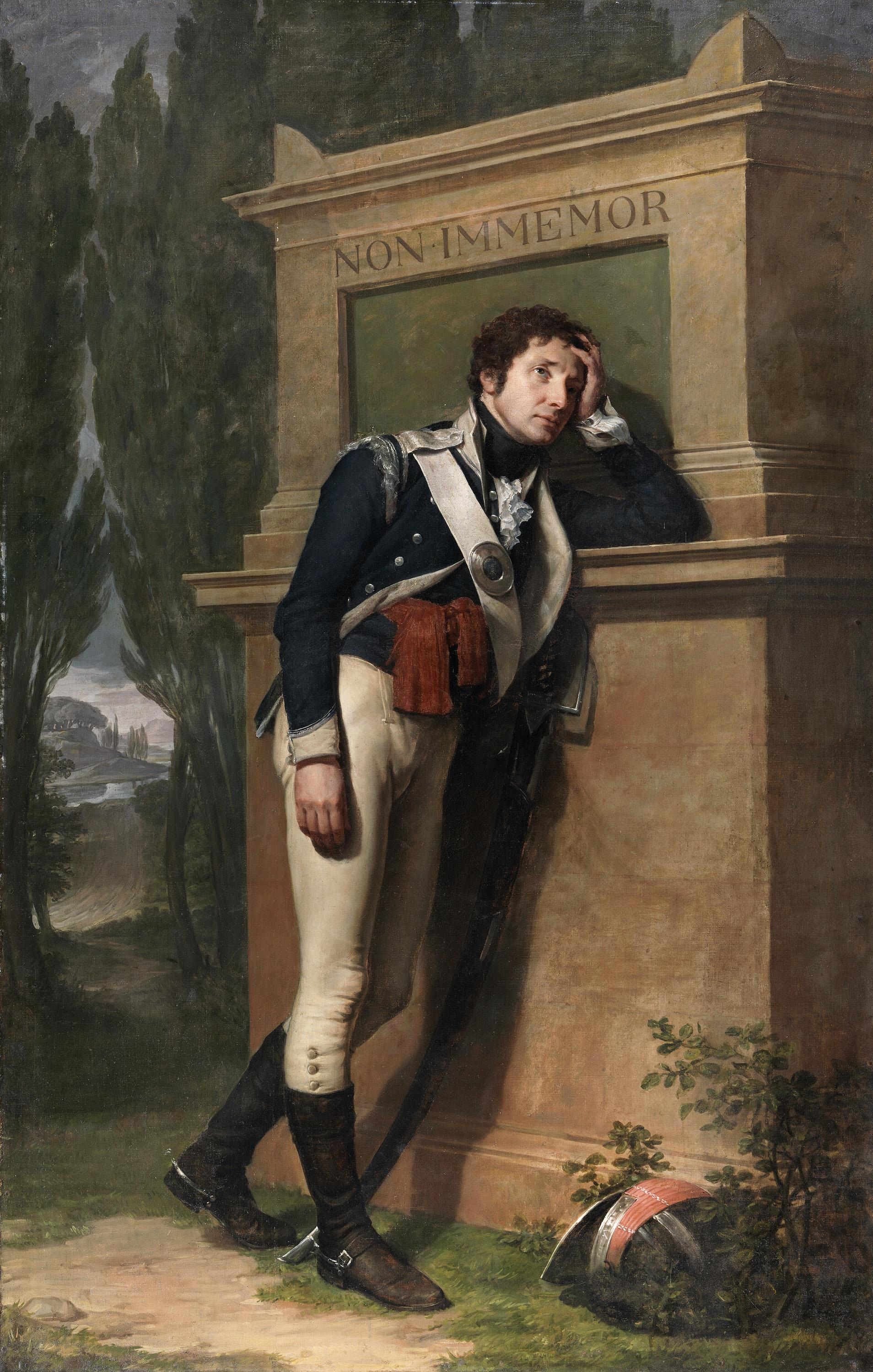
1796 portrait of a regimental lieutenant

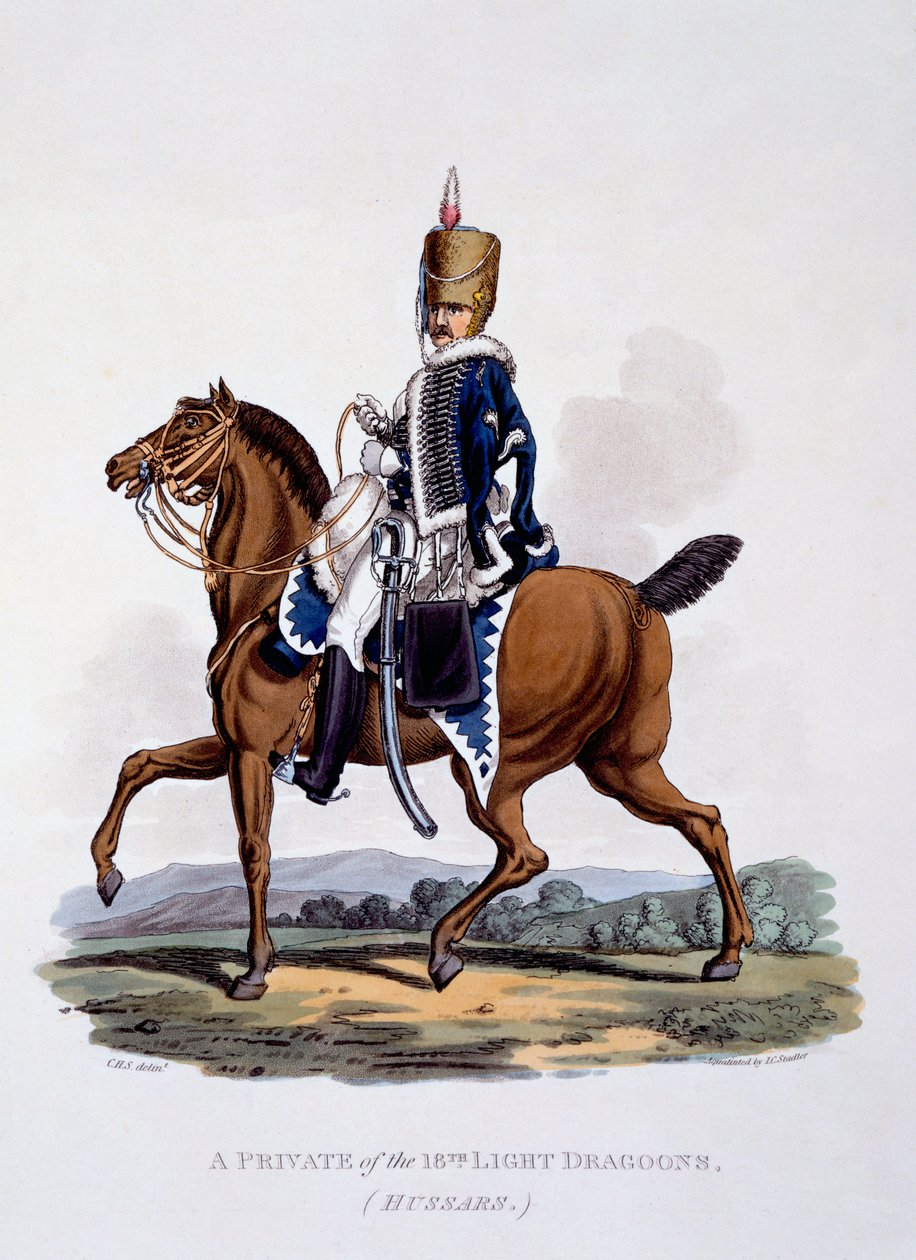
1812 engraving of a regimental private

The regiment was first raised by Charles Moore, 1st Marquess of Drogheda as the 19th Regiment of (Light) Dragoons in 1759; it was also known as Drogheda's Light Horse. It was renumbered the 18th Regiment of (Light) Dragoons in 1763, and briefly the 4th Regiment of Light Dragoons in 1766 before reverting to the 18th in 1769. Arthur Wellesley was briefly a junior officer in the regiment between October 1792 and April 1793. The regiment undertook a one-year tour in Saint-Domingue between February 1796 and February 1797. It was in action at the Battle of Bergen in September 1799 during the Anglo-Russian invasion of Holland.

In 1805 it took the title of the 18th (King's Irish) Regiment of (Light) Dragoons, named for George III, and redesignated as hussars in 1807, becoming the 18th (King's Irish) Regiment of (Light) Dragoons (Hussars). The regiment landed at Lisbon in July 1808 for service in the Peninsular War. It fought at the Battle of Benavente in December 1808 and at the Battle of Cacabelos in January 1809 before taking part in the Battle of Corunna and the subsequent return to England later that month.

The regiment was ordered to support Sir Arthur Wellesley's Army on the Iberian Peninsula and landed at Lisbon in February 1813. It saw action at the Battle of Morales in June 1813, and the Battle of Vitoria in June 1813. It went on to fight at the Battle of Sorauren in July 1813 and, having advanced into France, at the Battle of the Nive in December 1813, at the Battle of Orthez in February 1814 and at the Battle of Toulouse in April 1814. It returned home in July 1814.

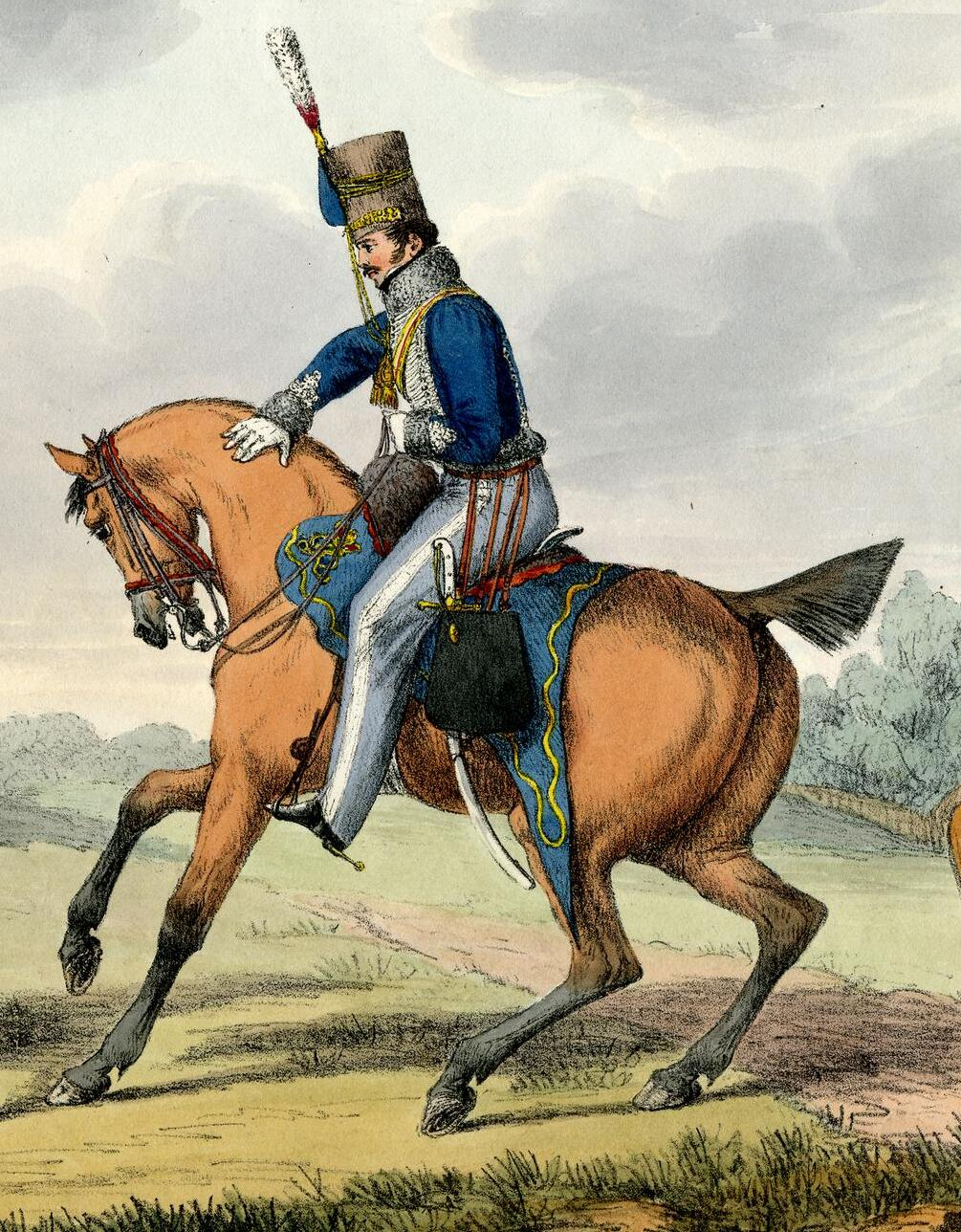
1819 illustration of a regimental officer

The regiment took part in the Hundred Days landing at Ostend in April 1815. It charged the centre of the French position at the Battle of Waterloo in June 1815. It then remained in France as part of the Army of Occupation brigaded with the 12th (Prince of Wales's) Regiment of (Light) Dragoons under the overall command of Major-General Sir Hussey Vivian. It was disbanded in Ireland in 1821.

=== Re-formed ===
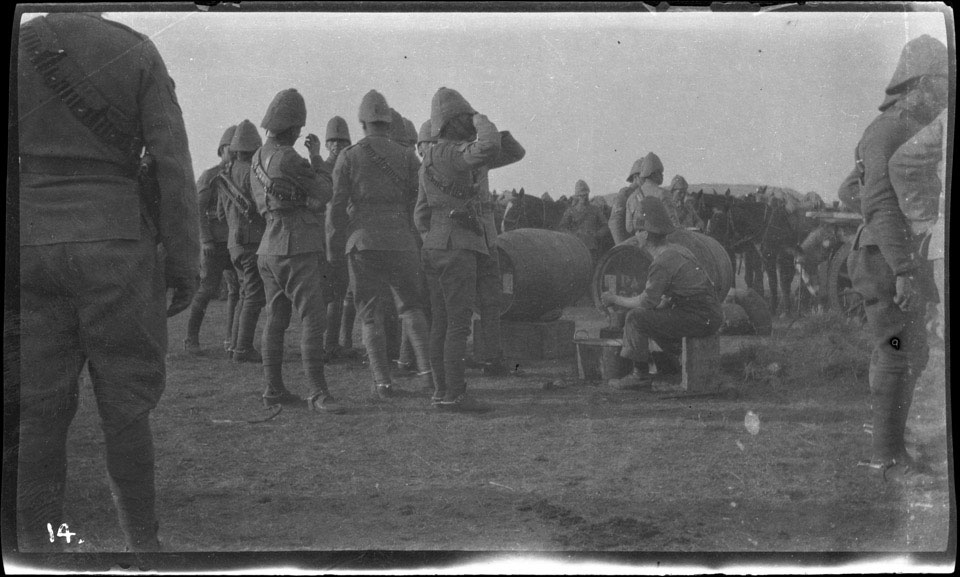
Regimental troops drinking beer at Zandspruit, 1900

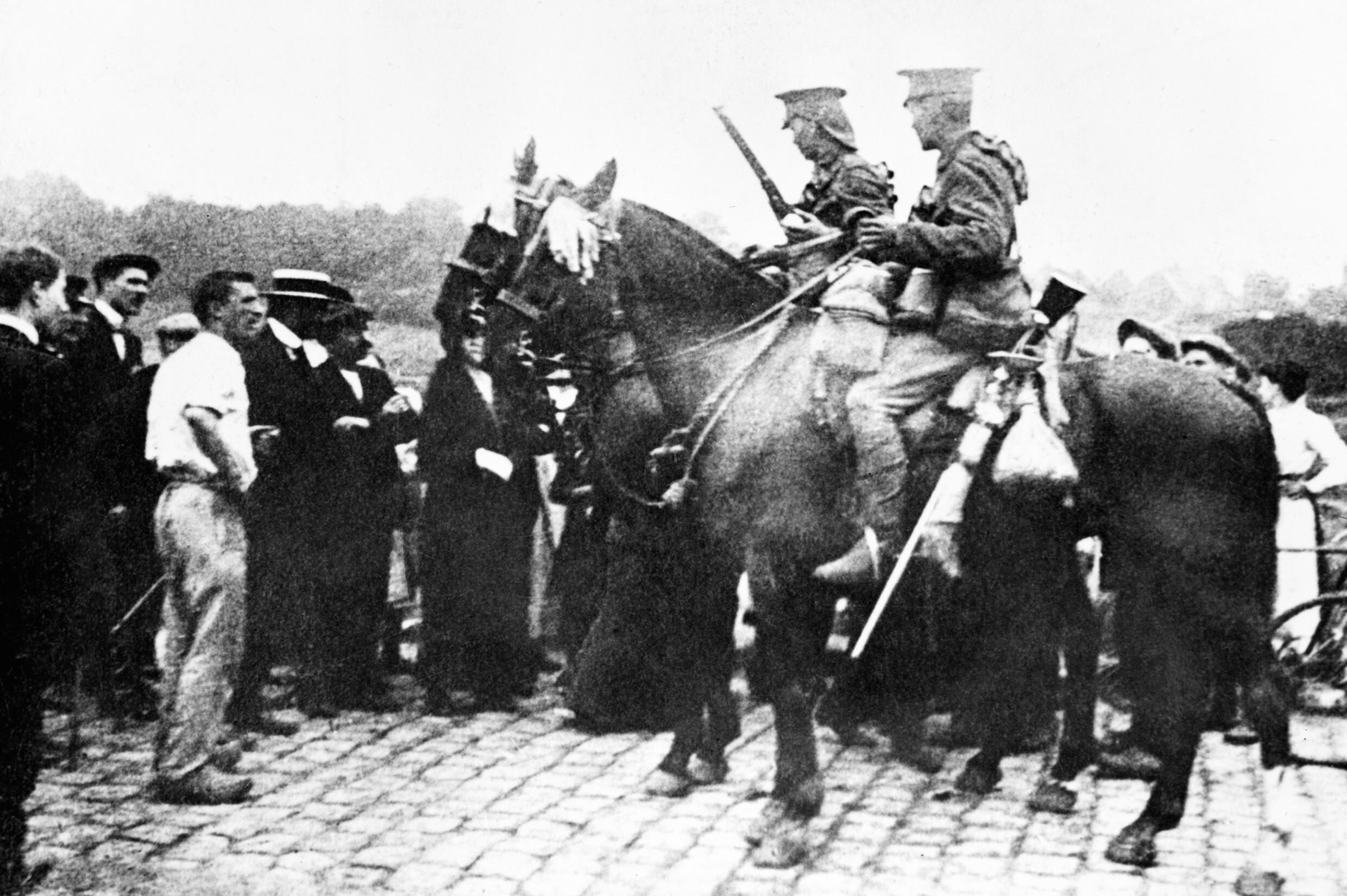
Regimental patrol attempting to obtain information from Frenchmen, August 1914

The regiment was reformed in Leeds in 1858, as the 18th Regiment of (Light) Dragoons from a nucleus taken from the 15th Hussars, and was renamed the 18th Hussars in 1861. The regiment was deployed to South Africa in 1899 for service in the Second Boer War. At the outbreak of hostilities on 11 October 1899 it was one of only two regular cavalry regiments in South Africa. In the Battle of Talana Hill, on 20 October, part of the regiment was cut off by Boer forces and about 249 officers and men, including Lieutenant Colonel Benhardt Moller, were taken prisoner. Following a critical report, Moller was deprived of his command and placed on half-pay.

The reorganised regiment subsequently saw action during the Siege of Ladysmith. They stayed in South Africa throughout the war, which ended June 1902 with the Peace of Vereeniging. Four months later, 590 officers and men left Cape Town on the SS Englishman in late September 1902, and arrived at Southampton in late October, when they were posted to Aldershot Garrison.

In 1903 it was named the 18th (Princess of Wales's Own) Hussars, for Princess Mary, being retitled the 18th (Victoria Mary, Princess of Wales's Own) Hussars in 1905 and the 18th (Queen Mary's Own) Hussars in 1910 to mark her coronation as Queen Consort. The regiment, having been based at Tidworth Camp at the start of the First World War, landed at Boulogne-sur-Mer as part of the 2nd Cavalry Brigade in the 1st Cavalry Division in August 1914 for service on the Western Front. The regiment was retitled as the 18th (Queen Mary's Own) Royal Hussars in 1919 and then as the 18th Royal Hussars (Queen Mary's Own) in 1921. It amalgamated with the 13th Hussars to form the 13th/18th Royal Hussars in 1922.

== Regimental museum ==
The regimental collection is held by the Discovery Museum in Newcastle upon Tyne.

== Colonels ==
Colonels of the regiment were:

Name	Appointment
F.M. Charles, Marquess of Drogheda	3 August 1762 (Note: Lord Drogheda entered the British Army, as cornet in the 12th Dragoons on 1 May 1744; was gazetted as Colonel of the 18th Hussars 3 August 1762; and died on 22 of December 1821; having been colonel of the Regiment for sixty-two years.)
Lt-Gen. Edward Byam	16 November 1858 (Note: Lieutenant-General Byam served the campaigns of 1812, '13, '14, and '15, including the battles of Salamanca, Vitoria, Orthez, and Waterloo, besides minor affairs. Severely wounded by a grape-shot while carrying the regimental colour of the 38th at Salamanca, and slightly wounded at Waterloo. He has received the War Medal with three Clasps. Major-General Byam's first commission was an ensigncy in the 38th, with which regiment he served two campaigns: all his other commissions and the rest of his service were in the 15th Hussars.)
Gen. Sir Charles Routledge O'Donnell	10 September 1864 (Note: Sir Charles O'Donnell was present with the Russian troops in the campaign of 1828 on the Danube against the Turks; and in 1849 with the German troops in Schleswig-Holstein and Jutland, especially at Duppel and the battle of Fredericia.)
Gen. Sir Edward Cooper Hodge, GCB	19 November 1870
Gen. Sir Thomas Westropp McMahon, Bt., CB	6 January 1874
Lt-Gen. Sir William Drysdale, KCB	16 March 1885
Lt-Gen. Richard Knox	11 June 1891
Gen. Sir Alexander George Montgomery Moore, KCB	4 January 1892
Maj-Gen. Thomas Phillips	9 July 1904
Maj-Gen. Sir John Palmer Brabazon, KCB, CVO	10 November 1913

== Commanding officers ==
The commanding officers of the regiment included:

Name	Appointment
Richard Georges	17 June 1761
William Hardcourt	17 April 1765
Edward Walpole	25 June 1768
Charles Wilson Lyon	13 April 1771
Charles W. Vane Stewart	12 April 1799
Oliver Thomas Jones	29 January 1801
Henry Murray	2 January 1812
Richard Knox	23 February 1858
Percival Scrope Marling	19 February 1902

== Battle honours ==
The regiment's battle honours were as follows:

- Peninsula, Waterloo, Defence of Ladysmith, South Africa 1899-1902
- The Great War: Mons, Le Cateau, Retreat from Mons, Marne 1914, Aisne 1914, La Bassée 1914, Messines 1914, Armentières 1914, Ypres 1914 '15, Gravenstafel, St. Julien, Frezenberg, Bellewaarde, Somme 1916 '18, Flers-Courcelette, Arras 1917, Scarpe 1917, Cambrai 1917 '18, St. Quentin, Rosières, Amiens, Albert 1918, Hindenburg Line, Pursuit to Mons, France and Flanders 1914-18

== Uniforms ==
When reraised in 1858 the regiment wore the standard dark blue uniform and elaborate yellow braiding of regular British hussars of the period. Busby bags and plumes were in the unique colour of Lincoln green. Battle honours won by the previous 18th Hussars, disbanded in 1821, were restored and displayed on the gold braided pouch belts and sabretaches (ornamental pouches) of the officers. In 1878 the green facings were replaced by blue bags and white plumes which had distinguished the original 18th Hussars. The horse furniture of officers included red and white throat plumes and leopardskins under the saddle. Khaki service dress was adopted in 1902 but the colourful and expensive dress described above was retained for full dress until the outbreak of war in 1914.

== See also ==
- British cavalry during the First World War
