= Timothy Colman =

British businessman (1929–2021)

Sir Timothy Colman KG KStJ
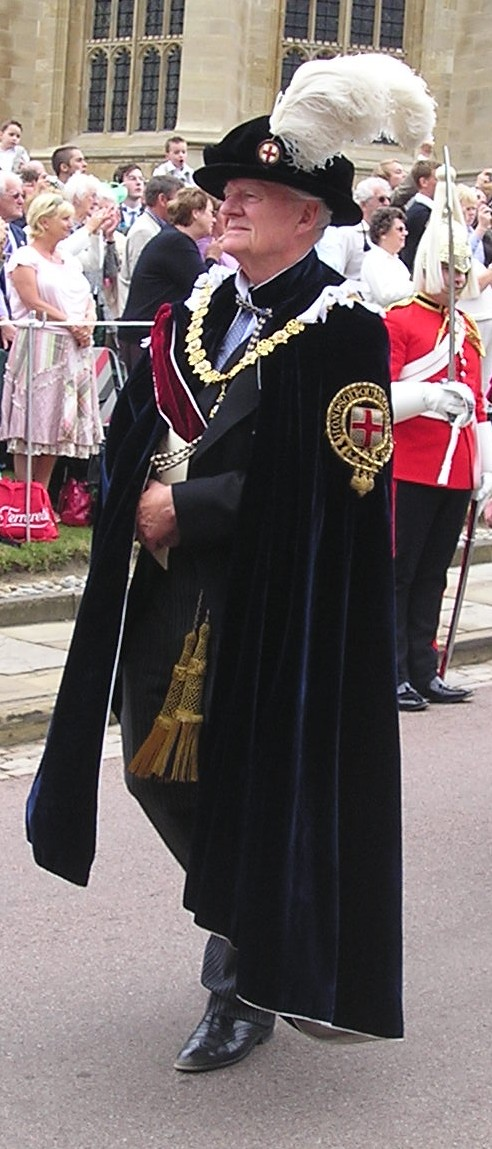
- Colman in procession to St George's Chapel, Windsor Castle for the annual service of the Order of the Garter in 2006

Lord Lieutenant of Norfolk
- In office 30 March 1978 – 19 September 2004
- Preceded by: Sir Edmund Bacon
- Succeeded by: Sir Richard Jewson

Personal details
- Born: Timothy James Alan Colman; 19 September 1929 Henstead, Norfolk, England
- Died: 9 September 2021 (aged 91) Bixley Manor, Norfolk, England
- Spouse: Lady Mary Bowes-Lyon (m. 1951; died 2021)
- Children: 5; including Sarah Troughton
- Parent(s): Geoffrey Colman; Lettice Adeane
- Education: Royal Naval College, Dartmouth
- Occupation: Businessman

Sir Timothy James Alan Colman (19 September 1929 – 9 September 2021) was a British businessman and a Lord Lieutenant of Norfolk.

== Biography ==
Colman was from the Colman's mustard family, and was the son of Lettice Elizabeth Evelyn Adeane and Geoffrey Colman. Colman was educated at Heatherdown Preparatory School in Berkshire and at the age of 13 enrolled at the Royal Naval College, Dartmouth, and joined the Royal Navy. Colman later served as a second lieutenant on HMS Frobisher and Indefatigable leaving as a lieutenant in 1953, before commencing a business career. He subsequently joined the Castaways' Club. Colman was chairman of the Eastern Counties Newspaper Group from 1969 to 1996. He was appointed a Knight Companion of the Order of the Garter in 1996.

Colman was a yachtsman, and claimed the record for the world's fastest yacht at 26.3 knots with Crossbow, a proa outrigger, at the inception of the World Sailing Speed Record Council in 1972. He increased the record to 31.2 knots three years later, and then in 1980 his catamaran Crossbow II extended the record to 36 knots. It held the record for six years until being beaten by the sailboard of Pascal Maka of France. Colman was a member of the Royal Yacht Squadron.

Colman had important roles in establishing the University of East Anglia, the creation of Whitlingham Broad and the Sainsbury Centre for Visual Arts.

== Personal life ==
His father died in 1935, when Timothy was just six, and his mother brought up him and his four siblings – David, Juliet, Penelope and Russell.

His brother David was killed at El Alamein in 1942 aged 21, the same age that his younger brother Russell died in a railway accident in 1958.

He was married to Lady Mary Colman (née Bowes-Lyon), niece of the Queen Mother, and lived in Bixley Manor, near Norwich. Lady Mary died on 2 January 2021 and Sir Timothy died at Bixley Manor on 9 September 2021, at the age of 91. His death came one day after fellow Knight Companion of the Garter Sir Antony Acland.

Colman's children include Sarah Troughton, who was appointed Lord Lieutenant of Wiltshire in 2012.

Coat of arms of Timothy Colman
Notes Knight since 1996 Crest Upon a rock proper, a three-pointed star Or between two wings Argent each charged with an estoile Sable Torse Mantling Gules doubled Argent Escutcheon Ermine on a pale indented Or between two crosses fleury Sable a lion rampant Gules armed and langued Azure. Orders The Order of the Garter circlet. Banner The banner of Sir Timothy Colman's arms used as Knight Companion of the Garter depicted at St George's Chapel.

Honorary titles
Preceded by Sir Edmund Castell Bacon, Bt	Lord Lieutenant of Norfolk; 1978–2004	Succeeded by Richard Jewson
Academic offices
Preceded by Sir Edmund Bacon, 13th Baronet	Pro-Chancellor of the University of East Anglia; 1973–1985	Succeeded by Colonel Geoffrey Dicker
