= Thomas Coke, 3rd Earl of Leicester =

British peer and soldier (1848–1941)

The Right Honourable The Earl of Leicester GCVO CMG TD

Lord-Lieutenant of Norfolk
- In office 3 September 1906 – 1 May 1929
- Preceded by: The Earl of Leicester
- Succeeded by: Russell James Colman

Personal details
- Born: Thomas William Coke; 20 July 1848 Holkham, Norfolk, England
- Died: 19 November 1941 (aged 93) Holkham, Norfolk, England
- Spouse: The Hon. Alice Emily White (m. 1879; died 1936)
- Children: Thomas Coke, 4th Earl of Leicester; The Hon. Arthur Coke; Lady Marjory Dalrymple-Hamilton; The Hon. Roger Coke; Alexandra Ogilvy, Countess of Airlie
- Parent(s): Thomas Coke, 2nd Earl of Leicester; Juliana Whitbread

Thomas William Coke, 3rd Earl of Leicester GCVO CMG TD (20 July 1848 – 19 November 1941), known as Viscount Coke until 1909, was a British peer and soldier.

== Biography ==
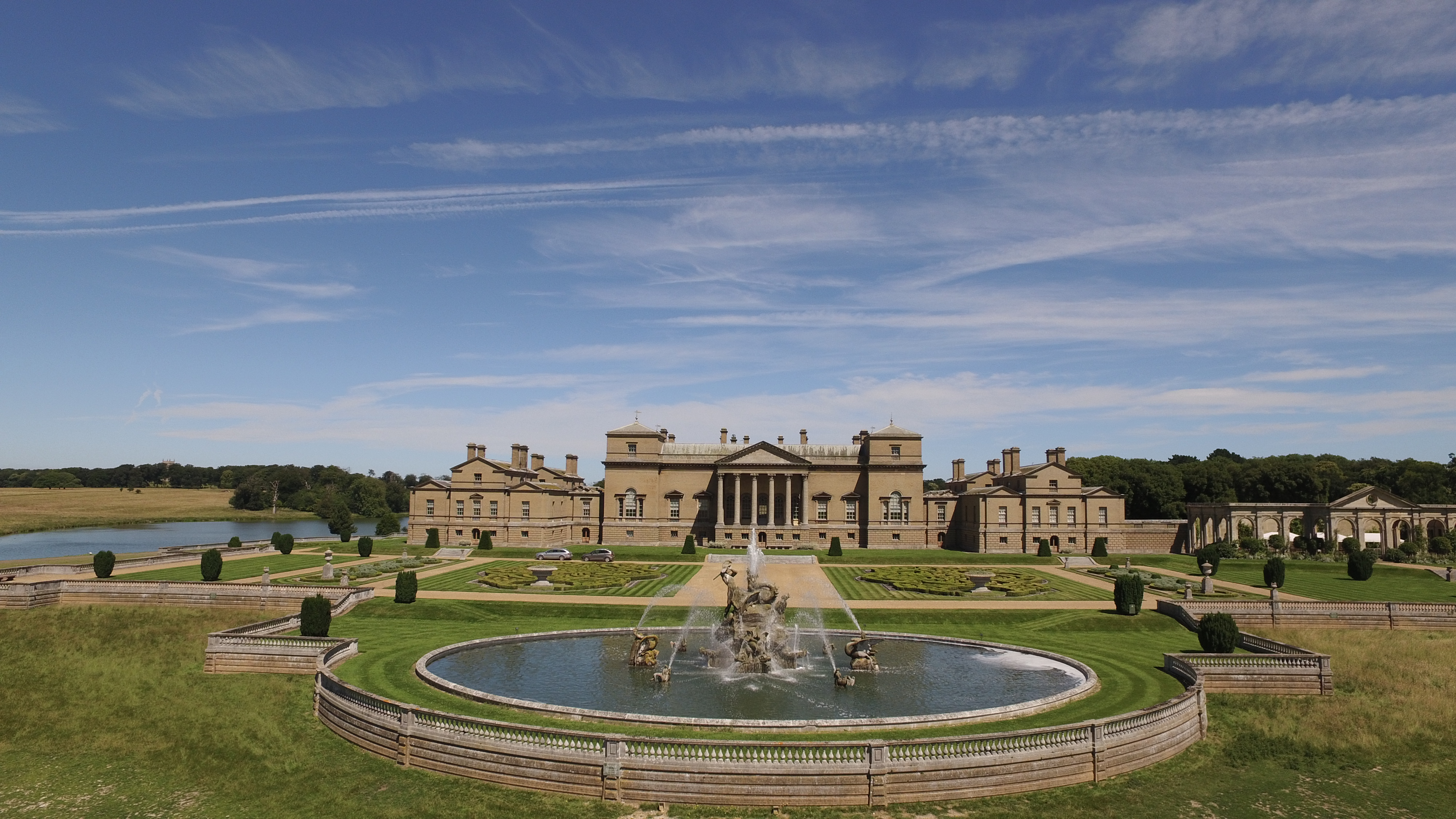
Holkham Hall, Norfolk

Leicester was the eldest son of Thomas Coke, 2nd Earl of Leicester, by his first wife Juliana (née Whitbread).

He was a Colonel in the 2nd Battalion of the Scots Guards and served in Egypt in 1882, and at Suakin in 1885. Having retired from the regular army, he was appointed lieutenant-colonel in command of the Norfolk Artillery Militia on 21 February 1894. Following the outbreak of the Second Boer War in late 1899, the militia regiment was embodied in May 1900, and around 100 men were sent to South Africa under the command of Lord Coke. After peace was declared in May 1902, they left Cape Town on board the SS Walmer Castle in late June, and arrived at Southampton the following month. For his service in the war, he was mentioned in despatches (including the final despatch by Lord Kitchener dated 23 June 1902), and was made a Companion of the Order of St Michael and St George (CMG) in the October 1902 South African Honours list. In January 1903 he was appointed an Aide-de-Camp for Militia to the King.

He was made a Knight Grand Cross of the Royal Victorian Order (GCVO) in 1908.

Lord Leicester held the position of Lord-Lieutenant of Norfolk from 1906 to 1929. He succeeded his father to the earldom and Holkham Hall in 1909.

== Personal life ==
Lord Leicester married the Hon. Alice Emily White, daughter of Luke White, 2nd Baron Annaly, on 26 August 1879. They had five children:

- Thomas William Coke, 4th Earl of Leicester (9 July 1880 – 21 August 1949)
- Lieutenant Hon. Arthur George Coke (6 April 1882 – 21 May 1915), killed in action whilst serving with the Royal Naval Air Service. He is commemorated on the Helles Memorial at Gallipoli. Father of Anthony Coke, 6th Earl of Leicester.
- Lady Marjory Alice Coke (1884 – 24 December 1946), married Sir North Dalrymple-Hamilton
- Hon. Roger Coke, AFC (28 December 1886 – 14 October 1960), an officer in the Royal Air Force.
- Lady Alexandra Marie Bridget Coke (1891–1984), married David Ogilvy, 12th Earl of Airlie in 1910

Alice Coke, Countess of Leicester was later appointed Dame Commander of the Order of the British Empire. She died in 1936. Lord Leicester survived her by five years and died in November 1941, aged 93. He was succeeded the earldom by his eldest son Thomas.

Honorary titles
Preceded by The Earl of Leicester	Lord-Lieutenant of Norfolk; 1906–1929	Succeeded by Russell James Colman
Peerage of the United Kingdom
Preceded by Thomas Coke	Earl of Leicester; 1909–1941	Succeeded by Thomas Coke
