= Thomas Coke, 5th Earl of Leicester =

British peer, army officer and courtier (1908–1976)

Major The Right Honourable The Earl of Leicester MVO DL

Member of the House of Lords
- Lord Temporal
- In office 21 August 1949 – 3 September 1976
- Preceded by: The 4th Earl of Leicester
- Succeeded by: The 6th Earl of Leicester

Personal details
- Born: Thomas William Edward Coke; 16 May 1908
- Died: 3 September 1976 (aged 68)
- Spouse: Lady Elizabeth Yorke (m. 1931)
- Children: Anne Tennant, Baroness Glenconner; Lady Carey Basset; Lady Sarah Walter
- Parent(s): Thomas Coke, 4th Earl of Leicester; Marion Trefusis

Major Thomas William Edward Coke, 5th Earl of Leicester (16 May 1908 – 3 September 1976), styled Viscount Coke from 1941 to 1949, was a British hereditary peer.

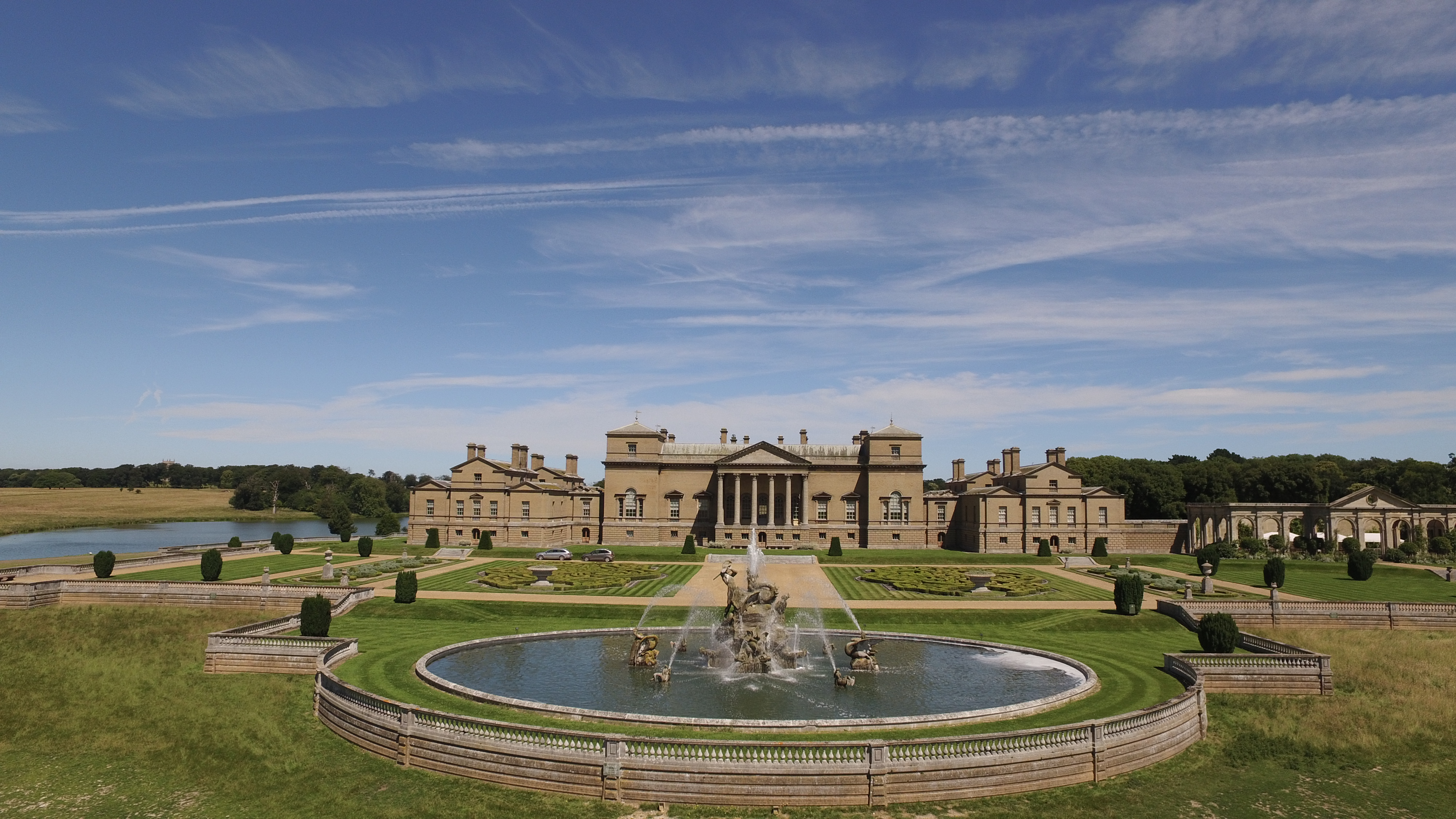
Holkham Hall, Norfolk

== Early life ==
Thomas William Edward Coke, 5th Earl of Leicester, was born on 16 May 1908. He was the son of the 4th Earl of Leicester and his wife Marion Gertrude (née) Trefusis. He was educated at Eton, and the Royal Military College, Sandhurst. He succeeded to the earldom upon on his father's death on 21 August 1949.

== Courtier ==
He was equerry to the Duke of York between 1934 and 1937, and was invested as a Member, Royal Victorian Order (M.V.O.) in 1937. When the Duke of York became King George VI, the Earl became Extra Equerry to the King between 1937 and 1952, and continued as Extra Equerry to Queen Elizabeth II.

He was awarded the Order of Christ of Portugal in 1955 and later with the Royal Order of George I of Greece in 1963.

Country	Date	Appointment	Ribbon	Post-nominal letters
United Kingdom	1937	Member of the Royal Victorian Order		MVO
United Kingdom	6 May 1935	King George V Silver Jubilee Medal		
United Kingdom	12 May 1937	King George VI Coronation Medal		
United Kingdom	2 June 1953	Queen Elizabeth II Coronation Medal		
Portugal	1955	Order of Christ		
Greece	1963	Royal Order of George I		

== Military career ==
He served as Aide-de-Camp to the Commander-in-Chief, Middle East, in World War II, reaching the rank of major, and later becoming an Honorary Colonel of the Royal Norfolk Regiment. He held the office of Deputy Lieutenant (D.L.) of Norfolk from 1944.

== Marriage and family ==
Leicester married Lady Elizabeth Mary Yorke (born 10 March 1912, died 1985), daughter of Charles Yorke, 8th Earl of Hardwicke, and Ellen Russell, on 1 October 1931.

The couple had three daughters:

- Lady Anne Veronica Coke (born 16 July 1932). Lady Anne was one of Queen Elizabeth II's Maids of Honour at the coronation in 1953. She married the Scottish peer Colin Tennant, 3rd Baron Glenconner, on 21 April 1956. They have five children. She was Extra Lady-in-Waiting to Princess Margaret, Countess of Snowdon, between 1971 and 2002. After her marriage, Lady Anne was styled as Baroness Glenconner on 4 October 1983. She was appointed Lieutenant, Royal Victorian Order (L.V.O.), in 1991.
- Lady Carey Elizabeth Coke (5 May 1934 – 14 May 2018). She married Bryan Ronald Basset on 30 April 1960. They have three sons: David Francis Basset (1961–2010), Michael James Basset (b. 1963) and James Bryan Basset (b. 1968).
- Lady Sarah Marion Coke (born 23 July 1944). She married Major David Finlayson Wylie-Hill Walter on 27 June 1970. They have two sons: Nicholas Robert Walter (b. 1972) and James George Walter (b. 1975).

Coke was the great-uncle of the actress Miranda Raison.

Leicester died on 3 September 1976 at age 68. Because he had no sons, he was succeeded in the earldom by his cousin Anthony Coke, who became the 6th Earl.

Peerage of the United Kingdom
Preceded by Thomas Coke	Earl of Leicester; 1949–1976; Member of the House of Lords (1949–1976)	Succeeded by Anthony Coke
