= Bacon baronets of Mildenhall (1627) =

Baronetcy

The Bacon baronetcy, of Mildenhall in the County of Suffolk, was created in the Baronetage of England on 29 July 1627 for Butts Bacon, seventh son of the 1st Baronet of the 1611 creation.

His great-grandson (the title having descended from father to son), Edmund, the 4th Baronet, represented Orford in Parliament. He was succeeded by his eldest son, Edmund, the 5th Baronet. He was Member of Parliament for Thetford. His only son, Edmund, the 6th Baronet, died unmarried at an early age in 1750. He was succeeded by his uncle, Henry, the 7th Baronet. He also died unmarried and was succeeded by his younger brother, Richard, the 8th Baronet. In 1755 he succeeded his third cousin once removed as 8th Baronet of Redgrave.

For further history of the titles, see Bacon baronets of Redgrave (1611).

== Bacon baronets, of Mildenhall (1627) ==
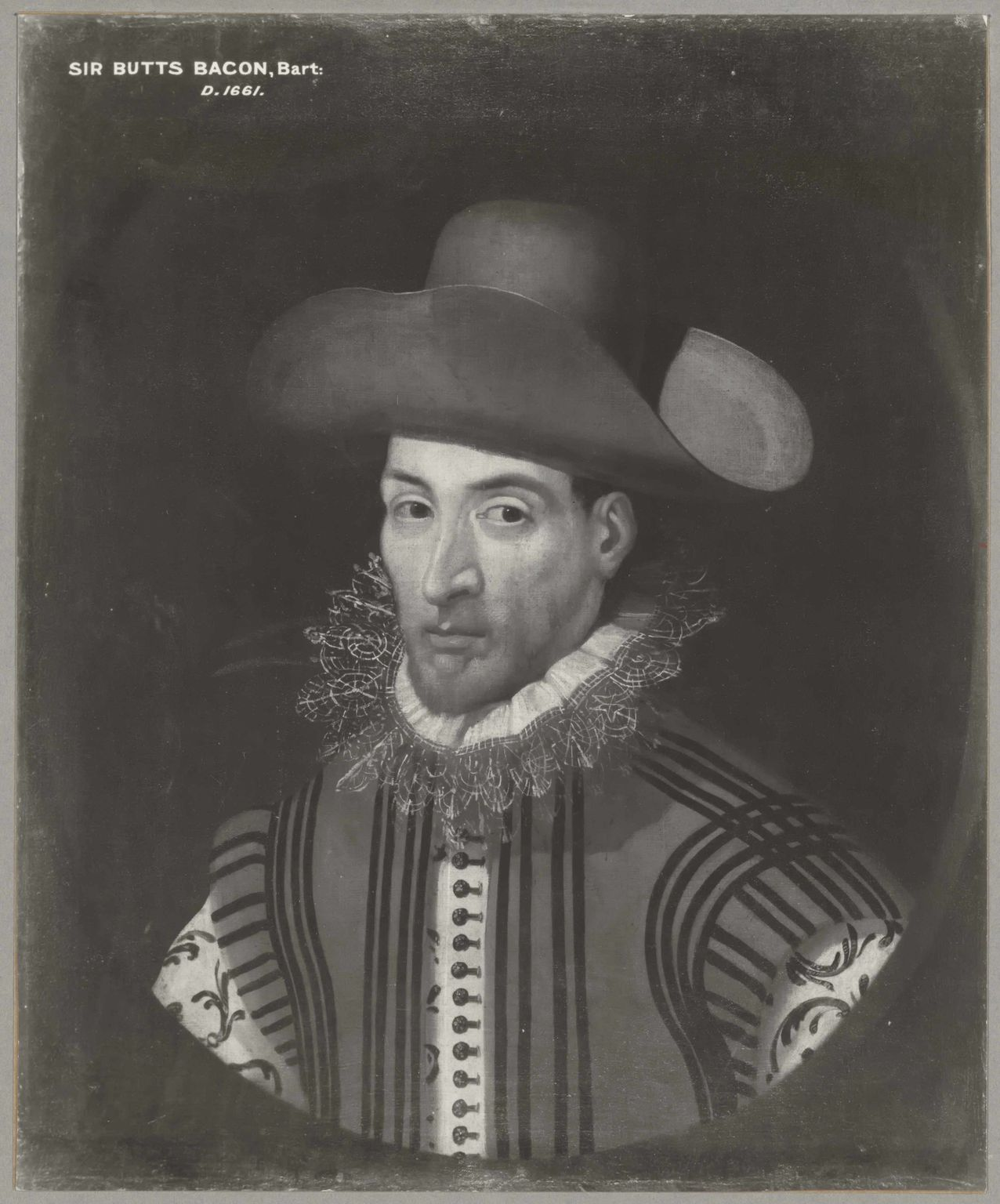
Sir Butts Bacon, 1st Baronet, painted by his brother, Nathaniel Bacon

- Sir Butts Bacon, 1st Baronet (24 March 1580 – 29 May 1661)
- Sir Henry Bacon, 2nd Baronet (1615–1670)
- Sir Henry Bacon, 3rd Baronet (died 1686)
- Sir Edmund Bacon, 4th Baronet (1672–1721)
- Sir Edmund Bacon, 5th Baronet (1693–1738)
- Sir Edmund Bacon, 6th Baronet (1725–1750)
- Sir Henry Bacon, 7th Baronet (1693–1753)
- Sir Richard Bacon, 8th Baronet (1695–1773) (and succeeded the 6th Baronet of Redgrave in 1755)

== Notes ==
Baronetage of England
Preceded by Bowyer baronets	Bacon baronets of Mildenhall; 29 July 1627	Succeeded by Corbet baronets
