= Bacon baronets =

Titles in the Baronetage of England

There have been three baronetcies created for members of the Bacon family, all in the Baronetage of England. As of 2026, one creation is extinct and two of the creations are extant. The extant titles have been merged since 1755.

- Bacon baronets of Redgrave (1611)
- Bacon baronets of Mildenhall (1627)
- Bacon baronets of Gillingham (1662)
