= Lord Lieutenant of Norfolk =

List of people who have served as Lord Lieutenant of Norfolk

This is an incomplete list of people who have served as Lord Lieutenant of Norfolk. Since 1689, all Lord Lieutenants have also been Custos Rotulorum of Norfolk.

- William Parr, 1st Marquess of Northampton, 1549 –
- Thomas Radclyffe, 3rd Earl of Sussex 1557–1559
- Thomas Howard, 4th Duke of Norfolk 1559–1572
- Henry Carey, 1st Baron Hunsdon 3 July 1585 – 23 July 1596
- Henry Howard, 1st Earl of Northampton 16 July 1605 – 16 June 1614
- Thomas Howard, 21st Earl of Arundel 18 April 1615 – 1642 jointly with
- Henry Howard, Lord Maltravers 28 February 1633 – 1642
- Interregnum
- Thomas Wriothesley, 4th Earl of Southampton 24 September 1660 – 19 August 1661
- Horatio Townshend, 1st Viscount Townshend 19 August 1661 – 6 March 1676
- Sir Robert Paston, 1st Earl of Yarmouth 6 March 1676 – 8 March 1683
- Henry Howard, 7th Duke of Norfolk 5 April 1683 – 2 April 1701
- Charles Townshend, 2nd Viscount Townshend 26 May 1701 – 30 April 1713
- James Butler, 2nd Duke of Ormonde 30 April 1713 – 30 October 1714
- Charles Townshend, 2nd Viscount Townshend 30 October 1714 – 25 June 1730
- Charles Townshend, Lord Lynn 25 June 1730 – 13 December 1739
- John Hobart, 1st Earl of Buckinghamshire 13 December 1739 – 22 September 1756
- George Walpole, 3rd Earl of Orford 29 June 1757 – 5 December 1791
- George Townshend, 1st Marquess Townshend 24 February 1792 – 14 September 1807
- William Assheton Harbord, 2nd Baron Suffield 11 March 1808 – 1 August 1821
- John Wodehouse, 2nd Baron Wodehouse 1 November 1821 – 31 May 1846
- Thomas Coke, 2nd Earl of Leicester 28 July 1846 – 3 September 1906
- Thomas Coke, 3rd Earl of Leicester 3 September 1906 – 1 May 1929
- Russell James Colman 1 May 1929 – 14 March 1944
- Thomas Coke, 4th Earl of Leicester 14 March 1944 – 21 August 1949
- Sir Edmund Bacon, 13th and 14th Baronet 30 September 1949 – 1978
- Sir Timothy Colman 30 March 1978 – 19 September 2004
- Sir Richard Jewson 19 September 2004 – 5 August 2019
- Lady Dannatt 5 August 2019 – present

== Deputy lieutenants ==
A deputy lieutenant of Norfolk is commissioned by the Lord Lieutenant of Norfolk. Deputy lieutenants support the work of the lord-lieutenant. There can be several deputy lieutenants at any time, depending on the population of the county. Their appointment does not terminate with the changing of the lord-lieutenant, but they usually retire at age 75.

=== 18th Century ===
- 15 February 1793: John Micklethwait
- 15 February 1793: John Marcon
- 15 February 1793: Francis Daltonm
- 15 February 1793: Edward Parry
- 15 February 1793: James Burkin Burroughes
- 15 February 1793: Charles Collyer
- 15 February 1793: Thomas Fisher
- 15 February 1793: Edmund Rolfe
- 15 February 1793: James Coldham
- 15 February 1793: John Mann, Gent.
- 6 June 1798: Lieutenant Colonel Thomas Halton
- 6 June 1798: Thomas Blake
- 6 June 1798: John Holley
- 6 June 1798: Rev. Robert Thomlinson
- 6 June 1798: Anthony Hammond
