= Sydney Ernest Smith =

British aviation pioneer

- Born: 24 April 1881; Farnham, Surrey, England
- Died: 11 June 1943 (aged 62); Bristol, England
- Military career
- Allegiance: United Kingdom
- Branch: Gloucestershire Regiment, Royal Flying Corps; Royal Air Force
- Rank: Colonel
- Awards: Commander of the Order of British Empire
- Other work: Justice of the peace

Colonel Sydney Ernest Smith CBE (24 April 1881 – 11 June 1943) was an English pioneer aviator, soldier, airman and company director.

== Early life ==
Smith was born on 24 April 1881 at Farnham, Surrey. In the 1901 Census of Bristol he was living with his widowed mother and was described as a Civil Engineer with Tramway Company. When the Bristol Aeroplane Company was founded by Sir George White Smith, Sir George's nephew was appointed manager. On 22 November 1910 Smith, flying a Bristol Boxkite at Brooklands, was awarded the 33rd Royal Aero Club aviators certificate. He then went to Australia to promote the use of aircraft on sheep farms.

== First World War ==
During the First World War Smith re-joined his old battalion with the rank of major and by 1915 he was attached to the Royal Flying Corps and later the Royal Air Force retiring with the rank of colonel.

== Post war ==
Smith was a director of the Imperial Tramways Company between 1926 and 1930 and a director and general manager of the Bristol Tramways and Carriage Company until he retired in 1935. He was also a director of the Bristol Aeroplane Company until his death.

== Family ==
Smith married Ethel Mary Ball in 1910 had they had two daughters – Alice G and Jean Mary and a son, the son was killed by enemy action in 1940.

Smith died at the Bristol Royal Infirmary on 11 June 1943.
