= Richard E. Blackwelder =

American entomologist

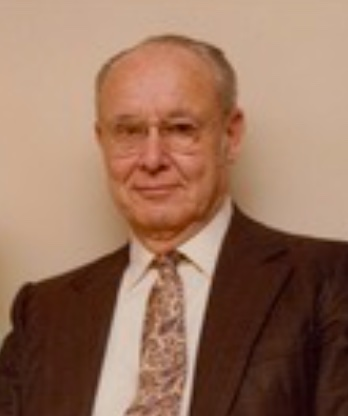
- Born: January 29, 1909
- Died: January 17, 2001 (aged 91); Cape Girardeau
- Occupation: Biologist, botanical collector, scientific collector
- Spouse(s): Ruth MacCoy Blackwelder

Richard Eliot Blackwelder (January 29, 1909 − January 17, 2001) was an American biologist, professor and author specializing in entomology and taxonomy. After a distinguished professional career, he retired in 1977, and in 1978 he discovered the works of J. R. R. Tolkien, which were to be the focus of his energies for the remainder of his life. Over the next twenty years, Blackwelder amassed a large collection of Tolkien-related books and other materials, which he sorted and indexed. The Blackwelder Collection, donated to Marquette University in 1982, is believed to be the largest single body of secondary sources on Tolkien ever to be developed.

== Marriage and academic career ==
Blackwelder was born in Madison, Wisconsin, and earned his Ph.D. degree in 1934 from Stanford University. He married Ruth MacCoy in 1935 and from June 1935 – March 1937 collected 50,000 Coleoptera and other insects in the West Indies as a Walter Rathbone Bacon Travelling Scholar for the Smithsonian Institution. He served as Assistant Curator of Entomology at the U.S. National Museum (now the National Museum of Natural History) from 1938 to 1939 and from 1940 to 1954 served as Assistant and Associate Curator at the Smithsonian Institution. He was associate professor at St. John Fisher College in Rochester, New York,(1956–1958) for two years before becoming (later in 1958) Professor of Zoology at Southern Illinois University in Carbondale, a position he held until is retirement in 1977.

In 1947, Blackwelder's colleague Waldo L. Schmitt and George W. Wharton established the Society of Systematic Zoology. Blackwelder was actively involved in the Society, serving as Secretary-Treasurer (1948–1959), and becoming its president in 1961. Blackwelder was a Fellow of the California Academy of Sciences and a Timothy Hopkins Lecturer.

== Monograph on the West Indian beetles of the family Staphylinidae ==
In biological taxonomy a monograph is a comprehensive treatment of a taxon. Blackwell's 1943 Monograph of West Indian Staphylinidae revised all known species of Staphylinidae (as it was defined at the time, except the largest subfamily, the Aleochorinae, which were simply listed, not revised) from the islands, added newly discovered species, redescribed species, provided synonymies and identification keys and collected together all available information on biology and morphological variations within the group. It remains a classic work of entomology, and is still the standard reference for the insects of the region.

The tasks involved were 1. collecting specimens and distribution data. 2. Collecting together all relevant existing literature. 3. Establishing the schema - which classification was to be used. 3. Stabilising the names and their antecedents [Synonymy]. 4. Detailing the known distribution and biology. 5. Checking the identity of specimens from several museums. 6 Collation in systematic order. 7 Referencing. 8. Indexing.

== Checklist of the beetles of Tropical America ==
Blackwelder's Checklist of the Coleopterous insects of Mexico, Central America, the West Indies, and South America was commenced in 1944 and completed in 1957. Although many European and American entomologists had worked extensively on Neotropical beetles no previous attempt had been made to list the entire fauna. Blackwelder found 50,000 names in the literature. The checklist was based initially on Junk's Coleopterorum Catalogus. To this Blackwelder added species listed in publications identified in the Zoological Record and where this proved incomplete he undertook the literature search himself. The Blackwelder checklist is the basis of many subsequent but partial lists and for some groups or regions is the only source of such information. It (and its derivatives) is a fundamental "tool of biodiversity".

== Tolkien collection ==
The knack for organizing and categorizing that drove Blackwelder to excel in taxonomy also colored his post-retirement passion for Tolkien's legendarium. Blackwelder amassed a large collection of Tolkieniana, which he sorted and indexed before arranging to donate the collection to the Archives of Marquette University. The Blackwelder Collection consists of "ten linear feet of documents in 140 ... three ring binders, ... over 1,200 volumes ... and over 70 theses and dissertations."

He spent four years compiling a concordance to the names of characters, animals, and plants in Tolkien's work, which was published in 1990 by Garland Press as A Tolkien Thesaurus. A fifteen-page companion booklet, Tolkien Phraseology, was published by Marquette in 1990.

During these years, Blackwelder was actively involved in Tolkien fandom, contributing frequently to Beyond Bree.

== Death and bequest ==
Blackwelder died on January 17, 2001, twelve days before his 92nd birthday. His ashes are interred with his wife's in the MacCoy niche at Sunset Mausoleum near Berkeley, California.

In 1987, Blackwelder established the Tolkien Archives Fund at Marquette University to catalog Marquette's manuscript collection, sponsor public programming, and to provide support for the acquisition and preservation of Tolkien research material in the Department of Special Collections. The fund is endowed by Blackwelder's estate. Among the acquisitions funded by this bequest is the Grace E. Funk Tolkien/Fantasy Fiction Collection of 2,376 books, articles, films, documentary videos, photocopied articles and newspaper clippings.

The Tolkien Archives Fund also contributed financial assistance to the Marquette University Tolkien Conference (October 21–23, 2004) "The Lord of the Rings 1954-2004: Scholarship in Honor of Richard E. Blackwelder". The proceedings of the conference were published in 2006.

== Books ==
Blackwelder's most important entomological works are

- 1936. Morphology of the Coleopterous Family Staphylinidae. Smithsonian Miscellaneous Collections 94(13): 1–102. Doctoral Thesis Stanford University advised by Gordon Floyd Ferris and Robert Evans Snodgrass
- 1939 with Ruth Blackwelder, Fourth supplement 1933–1938 (inclusive) to the Leng catalogue of Coleoptera of America, north of Mexico. J. D. Sherman, Mount Vernon.146 pp.
- 1943. Monograph of the West Indian beetles of the family Staphylinidae. Bulletin of the United States National Museum No. 182:viii + 658 pp.
- 1944-1957. Checklist of the Coleopterous insects of Mexico, Central America, the West Indies, and South America. USNM Bull. 185:i-xii 1492
- 1952 Generic names of the beetle family Staphylinidae with an essay on genotypy. Bull. U. S. Nat. Mus. 200, i-iv, 1-483.
- 1967 Taxonomy; A text and reference book New York, John Wiley ISBN 978-0-471-07800-5

His other significant works include:

- The Zest for Life, or Waldo Had a Pretty Good Run: The Life of Waldo LaSalle Schmitt The Allen Press, Inc., Lawrence, Kansas, 1979
- A Tolkien Thesaurus Garland Publishing, New York, 1990
- Tolkien Phraseology: A Companion to A Tolkien Thesaurus Tolkien Archives Fund, Marquette University, 1990
