= Imperial Tramways Company =

Former transport company

- Founded: 1878
- Defunct: 1930
- Headquarters: Bristol, United Kingdom
- Key people: George White

The Imperial Tramways Company Ltd (1878 to 1930) was created to bring under common management a number of street tramways. Originally based in London, its headquarters moved to Bristol in 1892 and from then on it shared its senior management with Bristol Tramways under the chairmanship of George White.

== History ==
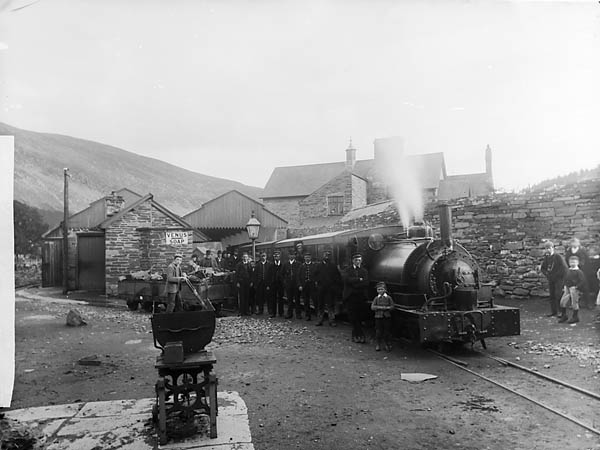
The Corris Railway

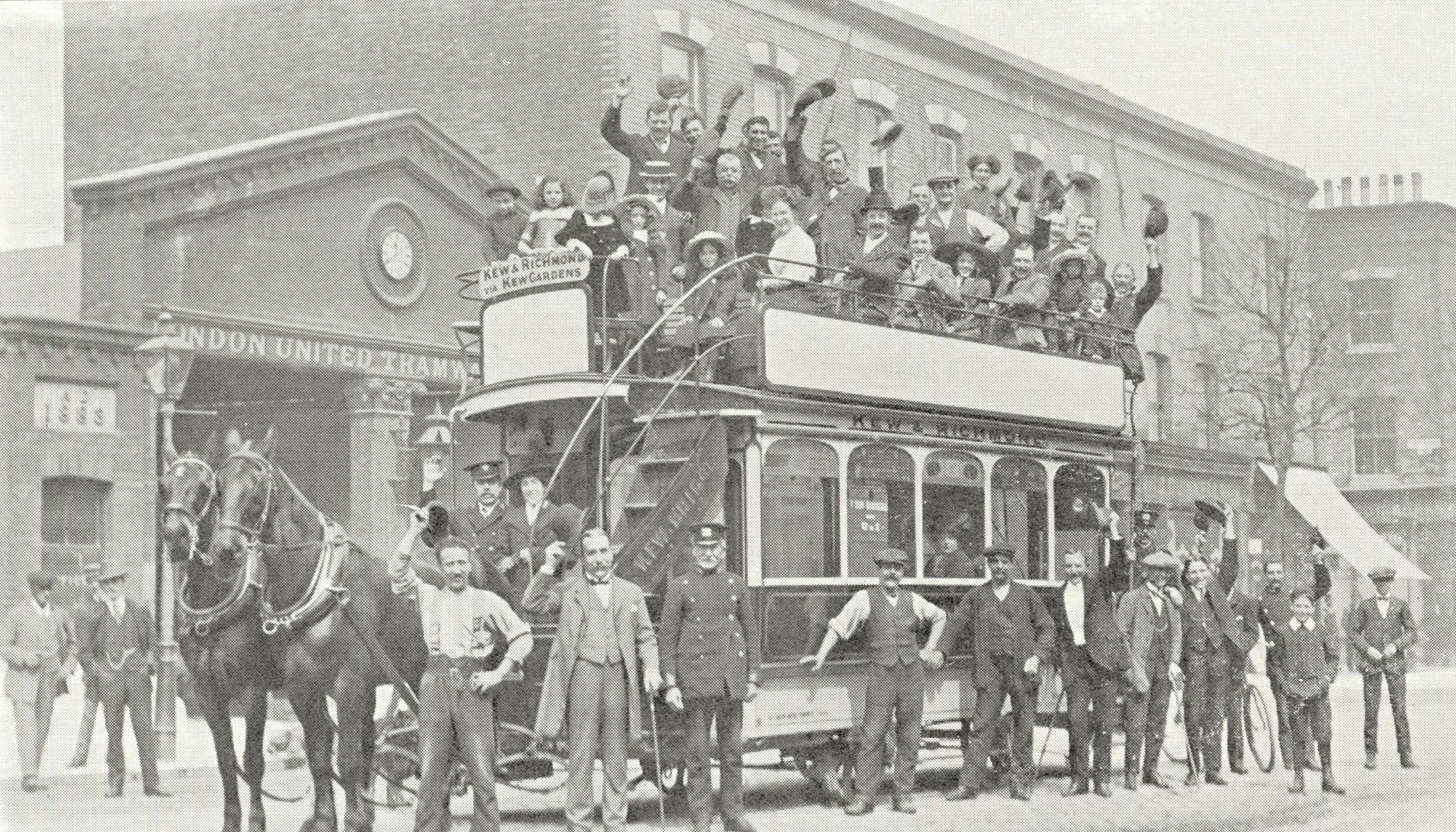
Tram in Richmond, part of London United Tramways

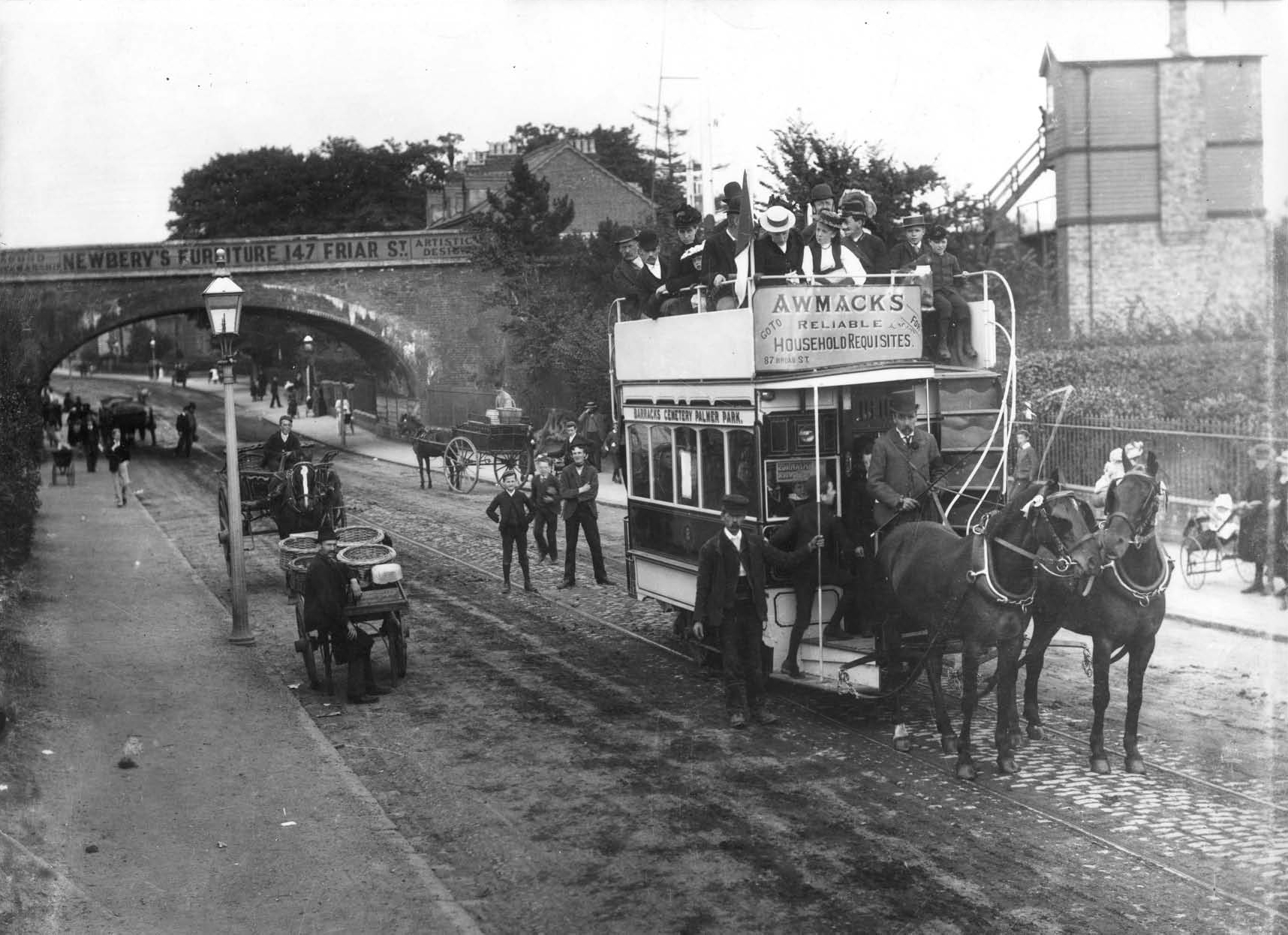
Reading horse tram

In 1878 Imperial acquired the street tramway systems in Middlesbrough, Dublin (Southern District), Gloucester and Reading, plus the Corris Railway in Wales. The Gloucester system was sold in 1881, the Dublin system in 1898, and Reading was taken over by the town council in 1901. The Darlington system was added in 1898 and taken over by its local council in 1902.

In 1894, Imperial formed London United Tramways to develop the moribund West Metropolitan system and, under the energetic leadership of Clifton Robinson, much of the system was electrified. Control of LUT passed from Imperial in the 1900s (it was later acquired by the London Passenger Transport Board in 1933), and thereafter Imperial served more as an investment vehicle for the White family than as a developer of tramway systems.

The system in Stockton-on-Tees was acquired in 1896, and was electrified as a part of the Middlesbrough, Stockton and Thornaby Electric Tramways Company, re-opening in 1898. This was taken over by the local council in 1921 and from 1926 buses began to replace it and the last tram ran on 9 June 1934. With the sale of the Corris Railway to the Great Western Railway in 1930 the Imperial company had outlived its purpose and was wound up.

== Directors ==
- Rowland Blennerhassett, from 1878 to 1879
- John Marshall Gillies, from 1878 to 1881
- Joseph William Greig, from 1878 to 1881
- Thomas Miller Mackay, from 1878 to 1880
- Alfred James Lambert, from 1878 to 1891
- Walter Rathbone Bacon, from 1879 to 1883
- William Ward, from 1882 to 1892
- Edward Temperley Gourley, from 1883 to 1892
- George White, from 1892 to 1916
- Hugh Charles Godfray, from 1892 to 1918
- Clifton Robinson, from 1892 to 1910
- Samuel White, from 1902 to 1928
- Hugh Greenfield Doggett, from 1910 to 1915
- James Henry Howell, from 1915 to 1926
- William George Verdon Smith, from 1917 to 1930
- George Stanley White, from 1917 to 1930
- Sydney Ernest Smith, from 1926 to 1930
- Sidney Edgar Baker, from 1929 to 1930
