= Walter Rathbone Bacon =

Walter Rathbone Bacon (February 22, 1845 – November 14, 1917) was an American capitalist who organised a system of tramways in Europe. Over his career, Bacon acted as director of Imperial Tramways Company, London Street Tramways Company, Corris Railway Company, Bell Punch Company Ltd., Hull Street Tramways Company, North Metropolitan Tramway Company and Belfast Street Tramways Company.

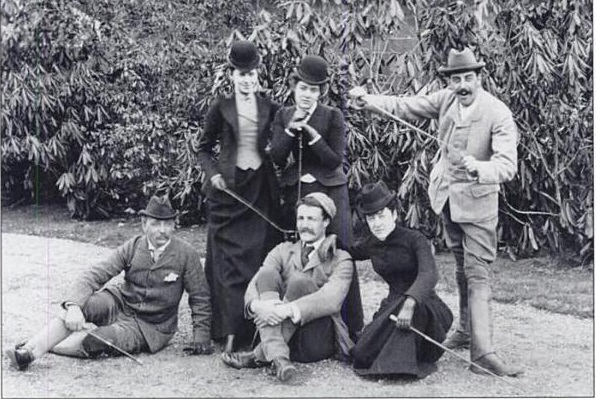
Circa 1892. Seated: Walter Rathbone Bacon, Gifford Pinchot, Virginia P. Bacon; Standing: Emily Sloane, Adele Sloane, George Vanderbilt

In 1882, in Bordeaux, France, Bacon married Virginia Purdy Barker, the youngest granddaughter of business magnate, Cornelius Vanderbilt. Bacon and his wife spent most of their time abroad, particularly in London and at Netherdale Estate, their Manor house in Turriff, Scotland. However, after the outbreak of World War I travel to Europe became more difficult and the Bacons remained in New York.

Walter, with his brother Edward R. Bacon, a lawyer, acted as president of the Knickerbocker Apartments at 247 Fifth Avenue, where the two lived with Walter's wife. The Knickerbocker apartments, in William B. Duncan's former mansion, were sold to the newly formed gentlemen's club, the Knickerbocker Club. The Knickerbocker club was formed out of the Union Club of the City of New York, by a group of members exasperated with the admittance of younger, less traditional members. Walter was also a member of Racquet and Tennis Club, in New York and The Reform Club, in London.

Walter died in his Fifth Avenue apartment on November 14, 1917. In 1911, Virginia established the Walter Rathbone Bacon Fellowship at the Smithsonian Institution in memory of her husband.
