= Clifton Robinson =

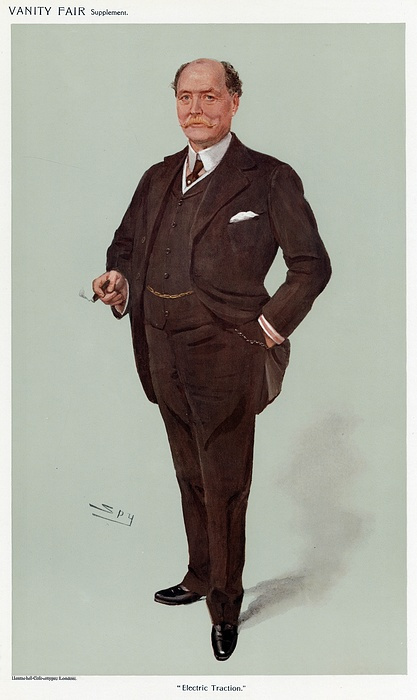
"Electric Traction", caricature by "Spy" (Leslie Ward) in Vanity Fair, 1909.

Sir (James) Clifton Robinson (1 January 1848 – 6 November 1910), born in Birkenhead, England, was known as the "Tramway King", having involvement in the building and operating of street tramways in New York City, London, Liverpool, Dublin, Cork, Bristol, Edinburgh and Los Angeles.

He was managing director of the Bristol Tramways, the Imperial Tramways Company, London United Tramways, and the Corris Railway.

In 1902, he was appointed as a director of the Metropolitan District Railway. He was awarded a knighthood in 1905 and died from heart disease in New York.
