= Sir George White, 1st Baronet =

English businessman

- Born: 28 March 1854; Kingsdown, Bristol, England, UK
- Died: 22 November 1916 (aged 62); Stoke Bishop, Bristol, England, UK
- Occupation: Transportation
- Years active: 1869–1916
- Title: Knight of the Realm
- Spouse: Caroline Thomas
- Children: 2

Sir George White, 1st Baronet (1854–1916), was an English businessman and stockbroker based in Bristol. He was instrumental in the construction of the Bristol tramways and became a pioneer in the construction of electric tramways in England. In 1910 he formed, with his brother Samuel, the Bristol Aeroplane Company. He had many other interests, particularly in transport companies.

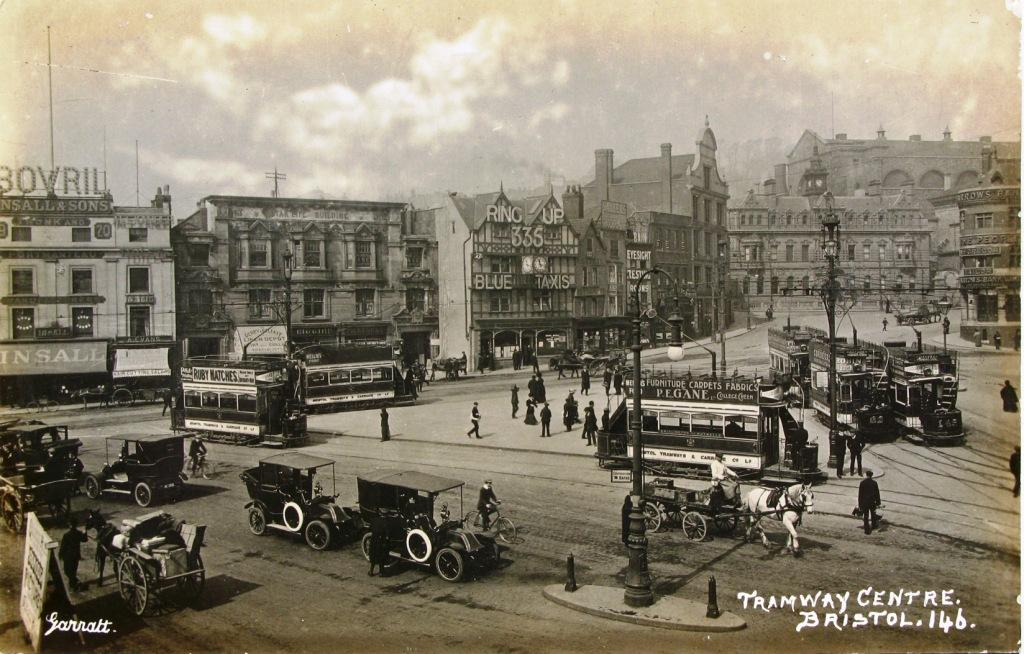
Bristol Tramways Centre

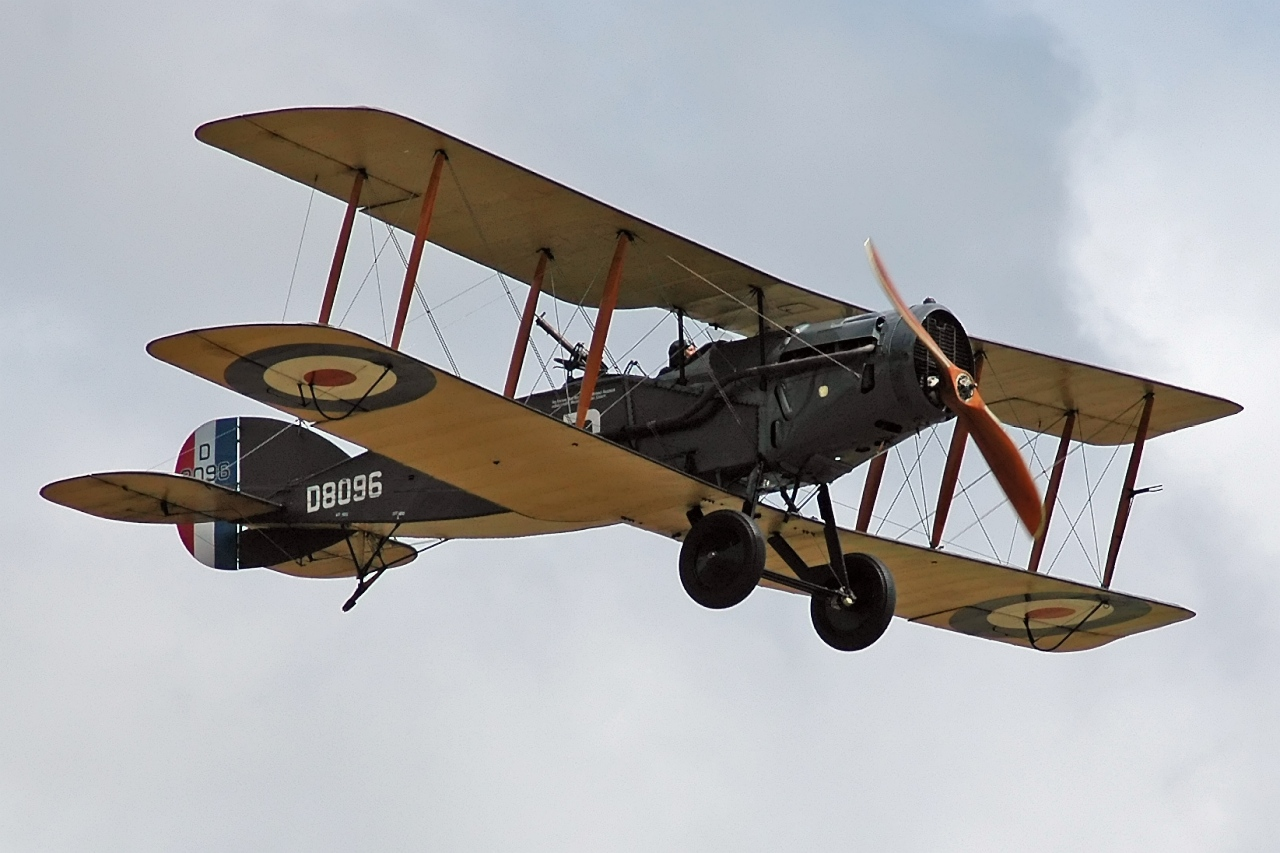
The Bristol Fighter saw service in the First World War

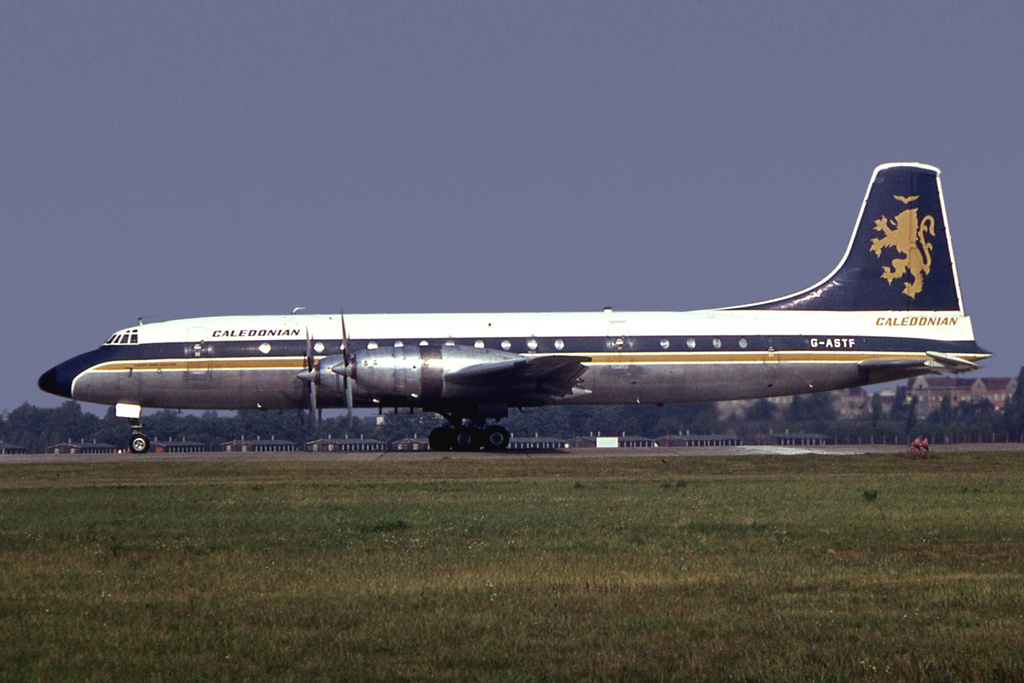
A much later product of the company he founded, the Bristol Britannia airliner

== Early life ==
White was born in Kingsdown, Bristol, on 28 March 1854, the son of James White, a painter and decorator, and his wife Eliza who had been a domestic servant before marrying. He attended St Michaels Boys' School, and in 1869 joined Stanley & Wasbrough (a Bristol firm of solicitors) as a junior clerk. In 1874 the firm was involved in the promotion of the Bristol Tramways Company, following the passage of the Tramways Act 1870 (33 & 34 Vict. c. 78), and White played a major part. In 1875 he left the company and established a stockbroking firm, George White & Co.

== Tramways, cabs and omnibuses ==
In 1875 White was working with some of the richest and most influential men in Bristol. William Butler was the chairman of the Bristol Tramways Company who had already made a fortune in tar-distilling. Wholesaler Henry Gale Gardner and coal magnate Joseph Wethered were also on the board, and George White became the part-time secretary of the Bristol Tramways Company at a salary of £150 per annum. Over the next ten years, White grew his stockbroking firm, using money borrowed from Henry Gale Gardner's wagon-building company and working on behalf of the wealthy contacts he had already made including Stuckey's Bank.

White continued to become more prominent in the Bristol Tramways Company. The 1880s saw the tramway network in Bristol grow and demand for more growth was abundant. George White maintained a good public profile and worked the local press so that the working class districts of Bristol would see the benefits the trams would give them. In the more affluent Clifton it was feared that the trams would bring in undesirable visitors and depress property values, resulting in the Clifton route being served only by horse omnibuses. In 1892 he also became involved in the Imperial Tramways Company, which operated horse trams in Middlesbrough, Dublin, Gloucester and Reading, the Corris Railway and, from 1894, London United Tramways, which operated horse trams in West London.

In 1887 the Bristol tramways company was merged into the new Bristol Tramways and Carriage Company with White as managing director after the company gained a monopoly on horse-drawn cabs travelling from Bristol Temple Meads station. By 1889 the company owned 876 horses and by 1891 the combined tramways, cab and omnibus company provided 38 journeys per head of Bristol's population per year.

In the 1890s White was an enthusiastic promoter of electric tramways together with the engineer James Clifton Robinson, to cut the high costs and get rid of the dirty aspects of horse-drawn trams. Starting with a line in Old Market and quickly rolling out the electric line to the existing tram system, as well as extending lines to Fishponds, Bedminster Down, Knowle, Brislington and Hanham, which was completed by 1900.

White's influence went far beyond Bristol. By 1892 he gained control of Imperial Tramways Company which ran networks in Dublin, Reading and Middlesbrough. In 1894 White and Clifton Robinson formed London United Tramways and created a major suburban transport system for the capital out of the derelict remains of the West Metropolitan Tramways Company. White also got himself involved in greater projects such as expansion of the Bristol & London & South Western Junction Railway, which involved using the tracks that the London and South Western Railway ran on for trains from Waterloo. Whilst the venture did not come to fruition due to overwhelming opposition from Great Western Railway, it still increased White's profile and standing with Bristol's civic and commercial elite. By 1887, White was the largest shareholder in the Bristol Port Railway & Pier Company and launched an ambitious but unsuccessful project to link the city docks with the Avonmouth Docks, opened only 10 years previously, to make a direct connection with the Midland Railway at Bristol.

White understood the importance of publicity and worked closely with his brother-in-law, Edward Everard to publish illustrated guides and brochures to advertise his companies' services.

White became Managing Director of Bristol Tramways in 1894 and chairman in 1900, a post he retained until his death. Under his leadership the company introduced motor buses in 1906, and began the manufacture of buses in 1908. It was renamed as the Bristol Omnibus Company in 1957.

== Motor vehicles ==
Between 1905 and 1908, White tested and developed a fleet of twelve motorised Thornycroft double-decker buses, with routes starting from Bristol and travelling to depots in Bath, Cheltenham, Gloucester and Weston-super-Mare. White saw motor taxis used in France and introduced them to Bristol's streets in 1908. In 1913 White built a motor construction factory in South Bristol capable of building 300 vehicles per year, and by 1914 the company was one of the biggest employers in Bristol with 17 tramways services and 15 omnibus services and a fleet of 44 buses, 169 tramcars, 124 taxis and 29 charabancs, plus vans, lorries and commercial vehicles.

== Aircraft ==
White became interested in heavier-than-air flight, and in 1909 saw Wilbur Wright flying in France. On 19 February 1910 he founded the Bristol Aeroplane Company (originally called the British & Colonial Aeroplane Company). This set out from the first to produce aircraft on a commercial scale, with premises in Filton at the end of White's tramway terminus. After some early misadventures the company produced 80 Bristol Boxkites to great commercial success. The first overseas order for Boxkites was from the Russian government in 1910, following which the licence to produce Bristol designs was sold to France, Germany and Italy. The Bristol Fighter went into production in 1916, shortly before White's death, for use during World War I.

== Other interests ==
White also had interests in the Great Western Steamship Company, the Bristol Port and Channel Dock Company (which built Avonmouth Docks), the North Somerset Railway, the Main Colliery Company and the Taff Vale Railway. He also served as president of the Bristol Stock Exchange.

== Philanthropy ==
In 1904 Sir George White saved Bristol Royal Infirmary from debts of over £15,000 by increasing the number of subscribed donors and planning a fundraising carnival at Bristol Zoo. White was appointed president of the hospital in 1906. Recognising the need to modernise the hospital building to keep up with innovations in science and medicine, he established a £50,000 fund to build a new hospital building. As a result, the new Edward VII Memorial Wing designed by Charles Holden was completed in 1912. White was also a benefactor of the Red Cross and other charities. He was created a baronet on 26 August 1904 for his public service.

== Personal life and death ==
White married Caroline Thomas (d. 1915) in 1876. They had two children, Daisy May (b. 1877) and George Stanley (b. 1882). He died at his home in Stoke Bishop, Bristol, on 22 November 1916, aged 62.

== Archives ==
Bristol Archives holds George White's personal papers and correspondence (Ref. 35810) (online catalogue), including records related to the Western Wagon & Property Company (Ref. 35810/WWP) (online catalogue), James Clifton Robinson (Ref. 35810/JCR) (online catalogue) and London United Tramways (Ref. 35810/LUT) (online catalogue), as well as the records of the Bristol Omnibus Company (Ref. 39735) (online catalogue). The British Library Sound Archive holds speech recordings of White which include reference to early aviation.

== Successors to the title ==
- White baronets of Cotham House (1904)
- Sir George Stanley White, 2nd Baronet (1882–1964)
- Sir George Stanley Midelton White, 3rd Baronet (1913–1983)
- Sir George Stanley James White, 4th Baronet (b. 1948)

== Bibliography ==
- Cheesley, David (1998). Bristol Transport (Archive Photographs). History Press. ISBN 978-0752410838.
- Harvey, Charles; Press, Jon (1989). Sir George White of Bristol, 1854-1916. Historical Assn.(Bristol). ISBN 978-0901388551.

Baronetage of the United Kingdom
New creation	Baronet (of Cotham House); 1904–1916	Succeeded by Stanley White
