= London United Tramways =

Tram and trolleybus operator in western and southern London

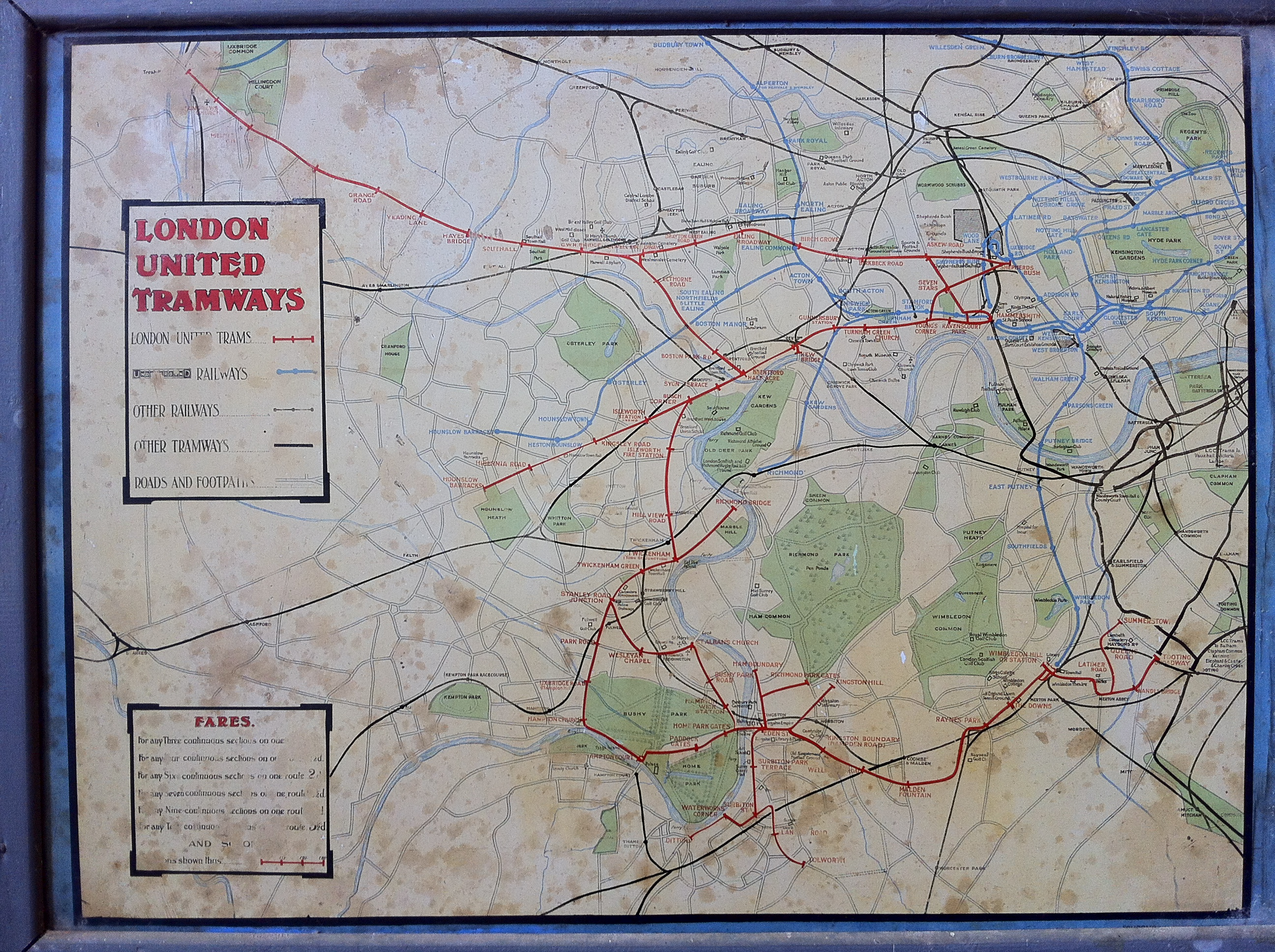
Map of the London United Tramways on the depot wall at the National Tramway Museum

London United Tramways Company Limited was an operator of trams and trolleybuses in the western and southern suburbs of London, UK, from 1894 to 1933, when it passed to the London Passenger Transport Board.

== Origins ==
The company was formed in 1894 by the Imperial Tramways Company under the leadership of George White and Clifton Robinson to take over the assets of the West Metropolitan Tramways Company, which had gone into receivership and had operated a horse-drawn tram service from Shepherd's Bush to Acton and Chiswick, and from Hammersmith to the north side of Kew Bridge via Chiswick. A short route ran from the south side of Kew Bridge to Richmond.

== Electrification ==
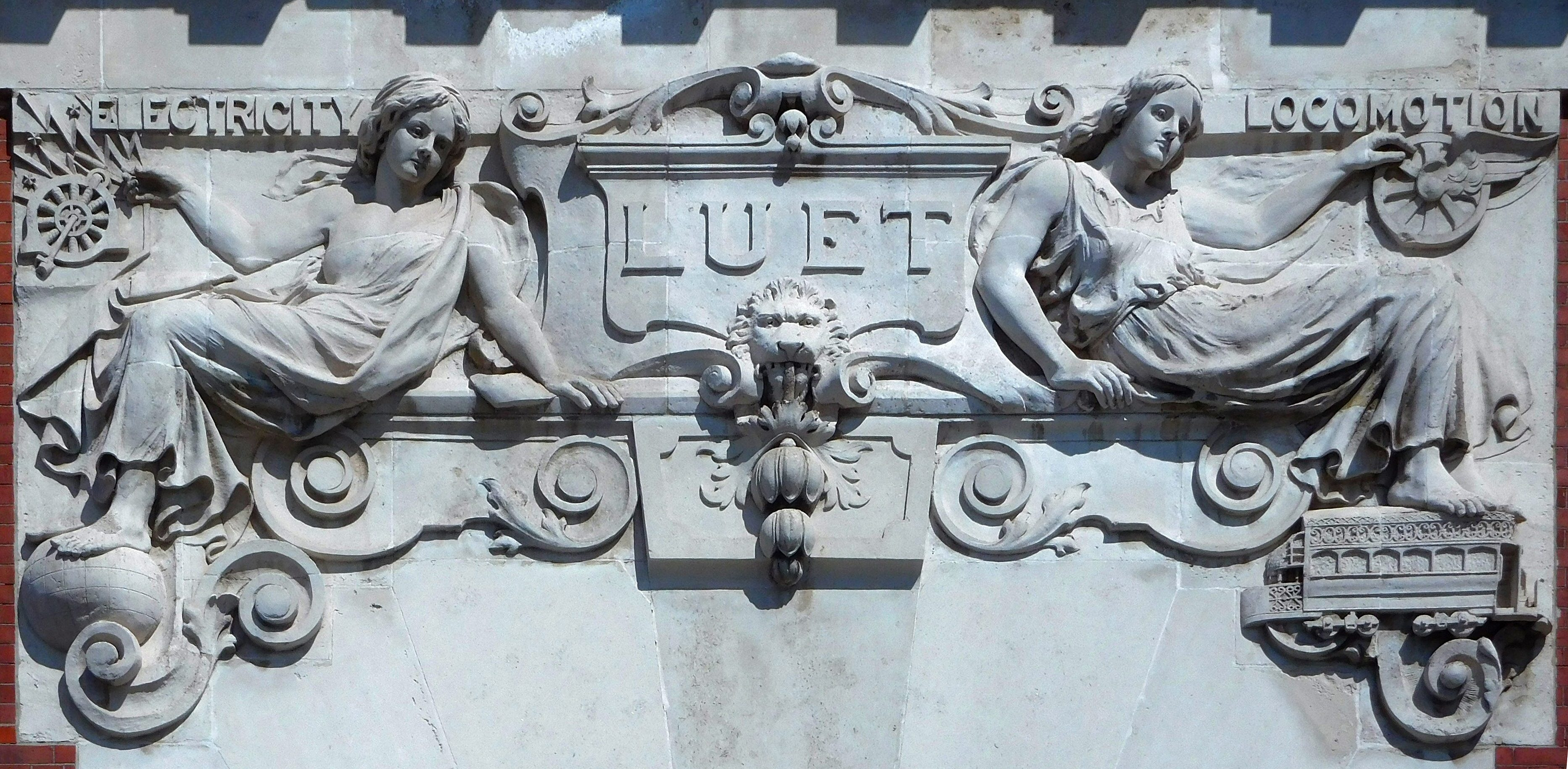
'Electricity' and 'Locomotion' sculpture on London United Electrical Tramway Company's Chiswick electricity generating station

LUT relaid the existing track, which was in a poor state of repair, and extended and electrified the system. Electric trams first ran on three routes on 4 April 1901 between Hammersmith and Kew Bridge, between Shepherd's Bush and Kew Bridge (via Chiswick), and between Shepherd's Bush and Acton, London's first electric tram service.

== Richmond branch ==
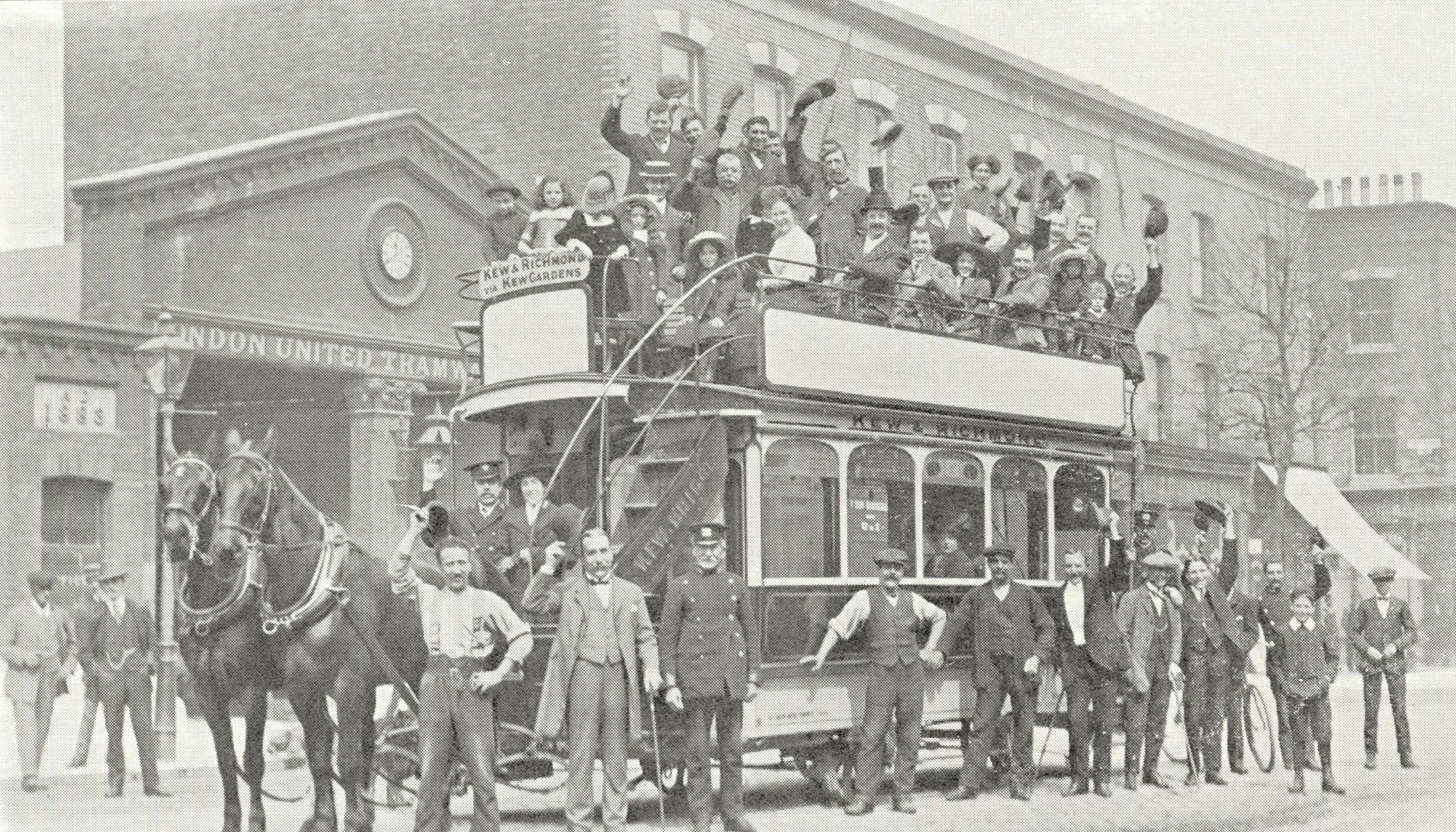
One of Richmond's trams outside the tram-shed

Trams never ran across Kew Bridge – the second (stone) bridge, built in the 1780s, was far too narrow, and very steep on the approach from Brentford – which meant that there was an isolated length of single track of 1.53 miles, with passing loops, from the south side of the bridge, across Kew Green, then south along the Kew Road to the Orange Tree public house 51.464228°N 0.301534°W in Richmond.

LUT made repeated attempts to cross Kew Bridge after it was rebuilt in 1903 but these continued to be resisted by the Richmond Corporation Tramways Committee. Kew Road residents opposed two attempts in 1897 and 1898 to install a second track – which would have necessitated road widening – and any subsequent electrification using unsightly overhead wires seemed out of the question, locals favouring the underground conduit system. Kew Observatory had concerns about the introduction of electric trams.

So whilst the rest of London went electric, this little branch continued to use horse-drawn cars until well into the 20th century – the interiors had red velvet seat cushions and were described as "comfortable, if not luxurious", and ran every quarter-hour (the full "end to end" journey costing 2d) – until 20 April 1912 after which it was replaced by part of a London General (LGOC) motor-bus route.

Richmond's tram-shed still exists as the former RACC Shaftesbury Centre in Kew Road, now part of The Falcons School for Boys, just north of the A316.

== Extensions to the system ==
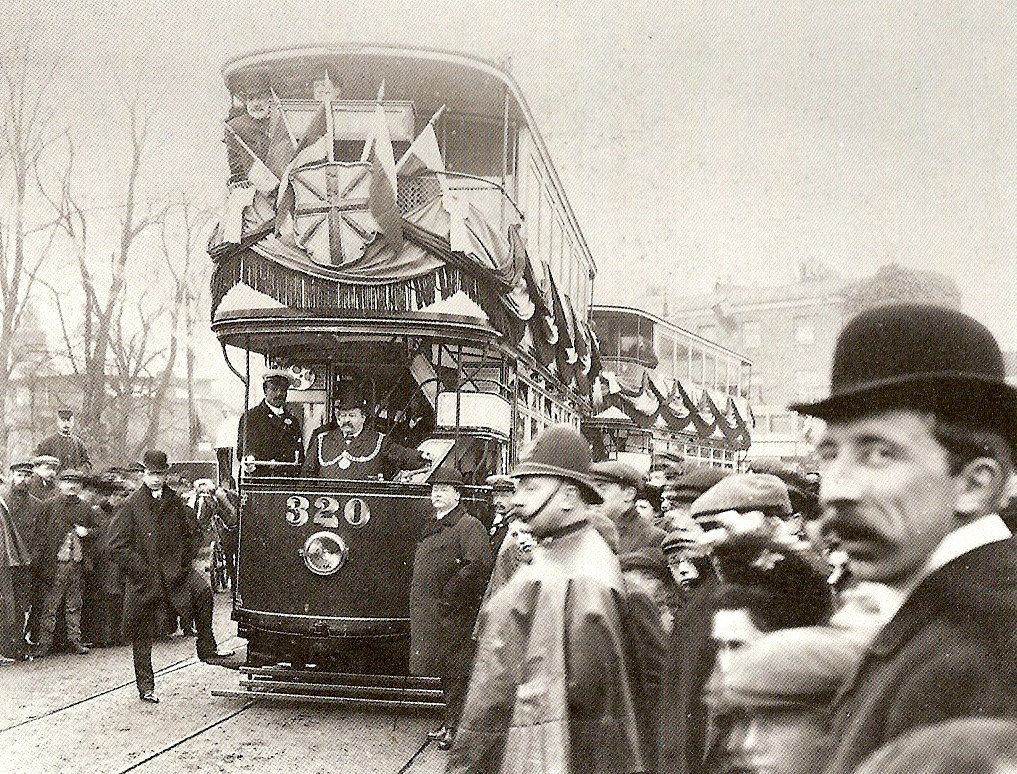
1 March 1906. The Mayor of Kingston upon Thames is about to drive number 320 onto Kingston Bridge. Clifton Robinson the Managing Director of London United Tramways is on the upper deck.

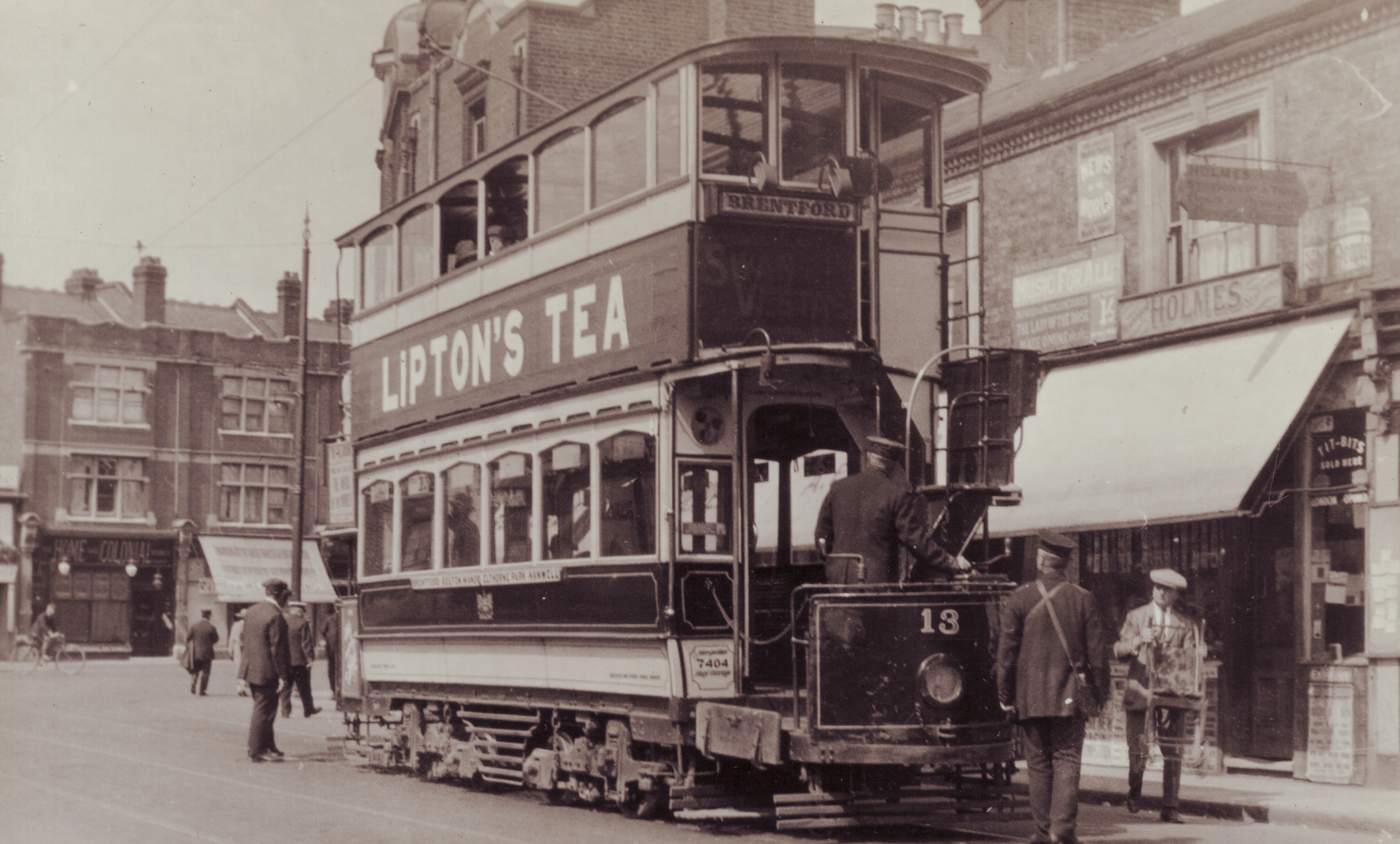
Tramcar 13 in Boston Road on a Hanwell to Brentford journey

- 1901: Chiswick to Brentford and Hounslow, Acton to Ealing, Southall and Uxbridge
- 1902: Hounslow to Hounslow Heath, Brentford to Richmond and Twickenham.
- 1903: Twickenham to Hampton, Hampton Court, East Twickenham (just west of Richmond Bridge) and Teddington.
- 1906: Richmond Bridge to Ham Common, Long Ditton, Malden, Richmond Park Gates, Surbiton and Tolworth.
- 1907: Malden to Raynes Park and Wimbledon.

The LUT system was connected to the London County Council tram network at Hammersmith in 1908, Tooting in 1922 and Wandsworth in 1931; and to the Metropolitan Electric Tramways (MET) at Acton in 1909.

== The LUT Company ==
The company's headquarters, depot and power station were in Chiswick. On 1 January 1913, LUT became a subsidiary of the London and Suburban Traction Company (LSTC), jointly owned by the Underground Group and British Electric Traction. LSTC also owned the other two tramway companies in the London area, Metropolitan Electric Tramways and South Metropolitan Electric Tramways.

London United Tramways Act 1930
- Act of Parliament
- Parliament of the United Kingdom
- Long title: An Act to authorise the London United Tramways Limited to provide services of trolley vehicles and to abandon their tramways and light railways to confer upon them additional powers and for other purposes.
- Citation: 20 & 21 Geo. 5. c. clxxxvii

Dates
- Royal assent: 1 August 1930

Text of statute as originally enacted

The London United Tramways Act 1930 (20 & 21 Geo. 5. c. clxxxvii) gave it powers to replace loss-making tram routes with trolleybuses. London's first trolleybus service started on LUT's Twickenham to Teddington section on 16 May 1931 and then to Wimbledon, working from Fulwell Garage. These first trolleybuses, nicknamed "Diddlers", which lasted until replaced in 1948, bore a striking frontal resemblance to the 'Feltham' trams, also built around this period.

On takeover by the LPTB on 1 July 1933, London United had approximately 29 miles (47 km) of tram track, 18 of trolleybus route.

== Preservation ==
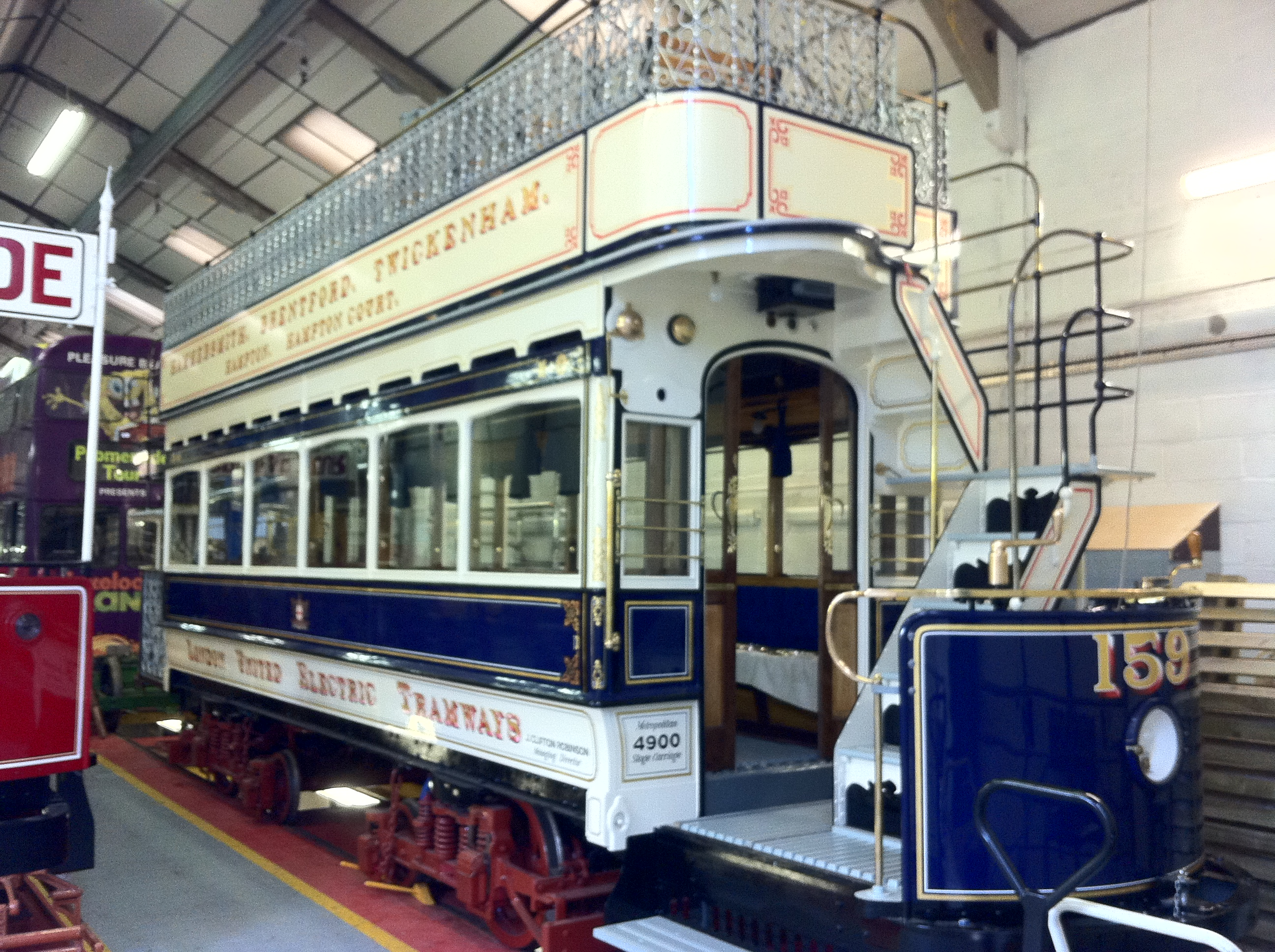
Preserved tramcar 159 in the depot at Crich

Only one LUT tramcar survives to the present day: no. 159, which has been restored to original condition and operates at the National Tramway Museum, Crich, Derbyshire.

== Archives ==
Records related to London United Tramways can be found at Bristol Archives within the papers of George White (Ref. 35810/LUT) (online catalogue). Further records can be found at London Metropolitan Archives and the National Tramway Museum

== See also ==
- Fulwell Tram Depot
- Fulwell Tram Depot – now Transdev's Fulwell Bus Garage (FW)
- Chiswick Tram Depot – now Stamford Brook Bus Garage (V)

== Sources ==
- London's Trams and Trolleybuses, John R. Day, published by London Transport in 1979
- The History of British Bus Services, Second Edition, John Hibbs, Newton Abbot, 1979
- The London United Tramways – Origins to 1912, Volume One, C.S. Smeeton, LRTA & TLRS, 1994
- A Scientific Workshop Threatened by Applied Science: Kew Observatory to Be Removed Owing to the Disturbance Caused by Electric Traction, The Illustrated London News, 8 August 1903
