= Virginia P. Bacon =

American heiress and art dealer

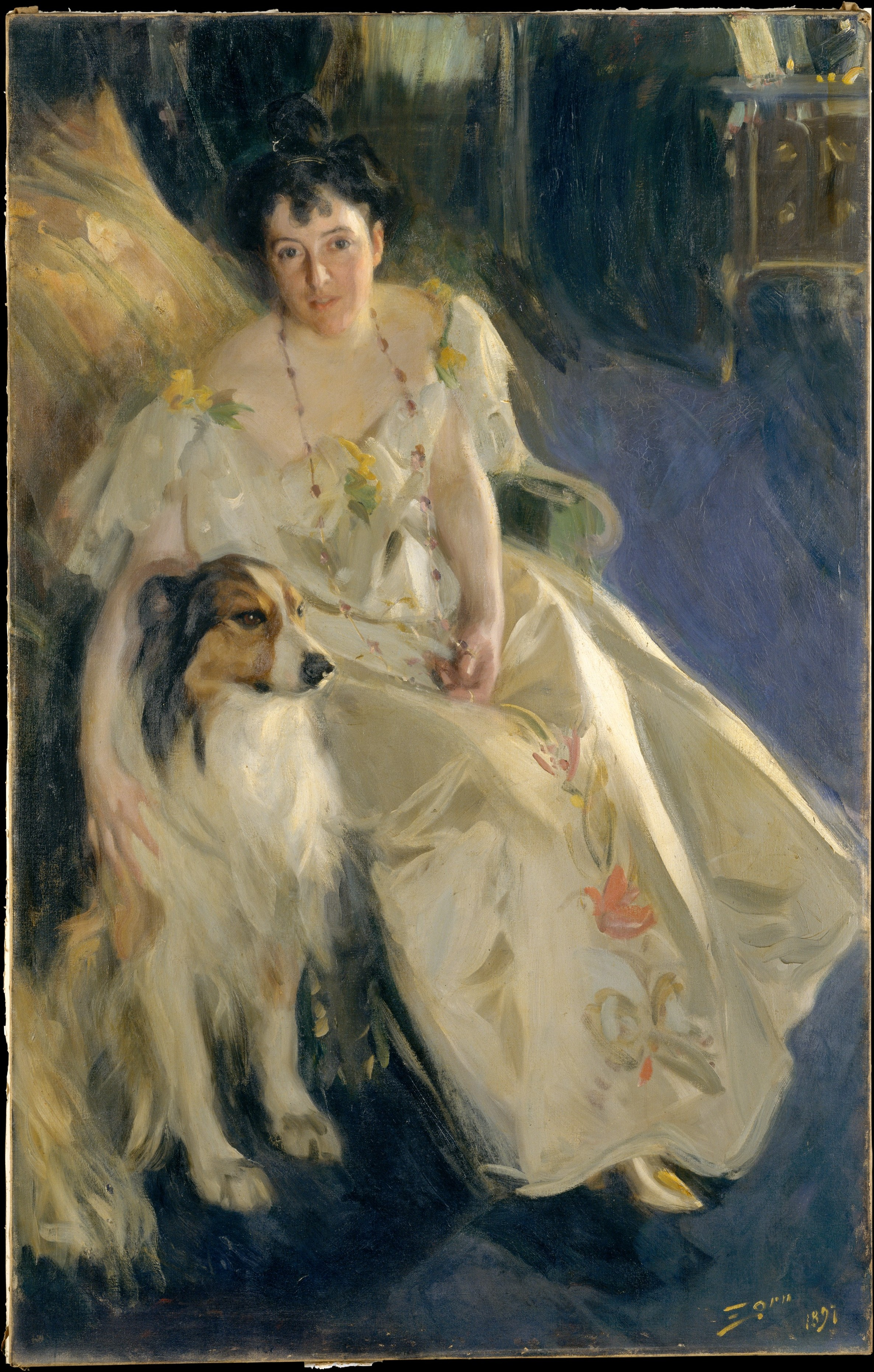
- Zorn's 1896 portrait of Mrs. Bacon, courtesy of the Metropolitan Museum of Art
- Born: Virginia Purdy Barker; 1853; New York City
- Died: April 7, 1919 (aged 65–66)
- Occupation: Art dealer
- Spouse: Walter Rathbone Bacon (m. 1882)

Virginia Purdy Bacon (née Barker) (1853 – April 7, 1919) was an American heiress and art dealer.

== Early life ==
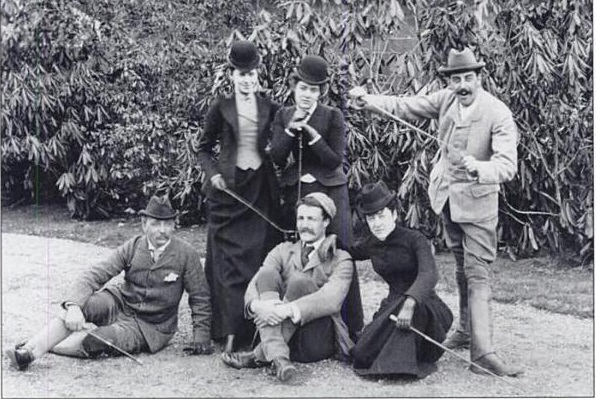
Circa 1892. Seated: Walter Rathbone Bacon, Gifford Pinchot, Virginia P. Bacon; Standing: Emily Sloane, Adele Sloane, George Vanderbilt

Virginia Purdy Barker was born in New York City in 1853. She was the youngest granddaughter of Commodore Cornelius Vanderbilt. Her mother, Katherine Juliette Vanderbilt Lafitte (formerly Katherine J. Vanderbilt Barker), moved her family to Bordeaux, France when Virginia was very young, and it is there that she was educated. Bacon's father, Smith Barker, died when she was a child.

== Personal life ==
Virginia married Walter Rathbone Bacon in Bordeaux, France, on February 16, 1882. After her marriage she divided her time between Bordeaux, France, Turriff, Scotland, and New York City. Her main places of residence were Netherdale House, the large estate she shared with Walter in Turriff, and the apartment at 247 Fifth Avenue in NoMad, Manhattan that she shared with Walter and his brother Edward Rathbone Bacon.

The couple returned to New York at least once a year. In 1914 the Bacons found themselves, and Virginia's brother-in-law Edward, stuck in the United States due to the outbreak of World War I. Neither Walter nor Edward would live to see the end of the war. Virginia died several months after peace was declared, on April 7, 1919. She died in her home from "a complication of diseases." Her funeral was held at St. Thomas Church in Manhattan and, along with her husband and brother-in-law, Virginia was buried in the Bacon Mausoleum in Woodlawn, New York. Virginia and Walter had no children. The only family noted in her obituary was her sister, Mrs. Schmidt Barker and her nephew, Harold Oakley Barker.

== Portraits and social status ==
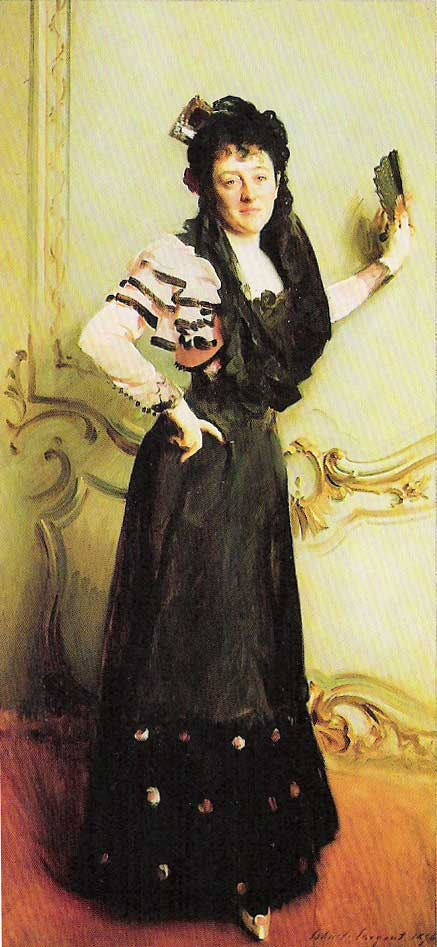
Mrs. Walter Bacon (Virginia Purdy Barker), John Singer Sargent, 1896

Bacon, decidedly a member of high society, does not seem to have had any regular employment. She most likely lived off of family money and the money her husband earned as a businessman. In any case, due to her connections with others of high social rank and wealth, as well as her interest in the art world, she was the subject of many paintings.

Bacon's close relationship to businessman and art enthusiast, Charles Deering resulted in several well-known artists reproducing her image. Charles Deering commissioned both Anders Zorn and Roman Casas to paint Bacon's portrait. In 1917 American Art News heralded Zorn's painting of Mrs. Bacon as "the finest woman’s portrait the Swedish modern master ever produced." This portrait is said to have been admired by both John Singer Sargent and James Whistler when it was exhibited in 1897 at the Paris Salon. Zorn also produced a half-length portrait of Bacon in Paris in 1891, two years before his first trip to the United States. It was owned first by Charles Deering, and is now in a private collection. Casas painted Bacon on one of his visits to New York, in his studio at the Waldorf Hotel. As well as providing the subject, Deering also influenced the style of Casas' painting. He insisted that Bacon be painted in a manilla shawl, because he saw her as "the Spanish type." Casas apparently drew a caricature of this painting, with Deering's face in place of Bacon's, and gave it to Deering as a gift.

George Vanderbilt commissioned John Singer Sargent's 1896 portrait of his cousin Mrs. Bacon. This painting is displayed in the Breakfast Room of Biltmore House in Asheville, North Carolina. American Art News also mentions that Carrier-Belleuse painted a full-length portrait of Mrs. Bacon, though this portrait has not been identified. In addition, Carl A. Weidner and Fredrika Weidner produced a small oval pendant, decorated with a watercolor portrait of Bacon painted on ivory.

In some cases she used her position to do good works. For example, to support the war effort Bacon donated several paintings to the Red Cross and other war work societies, to be auctioned off at the societies’ benefit.

== Control of the Edward R. Bacon Collection ==
Edward R. Bacon (died December 2, 1915) willed his substantial collection of Old Master paintings and Chinese decorative arts to Mr. Bacon, who upon his death transferred the collection to Mrs. Bacon. Though Edward was the main collector of these items, it is clear both Walter and Virginia were interested in his purchases. In a letter to his brother, Edward writes, "I think you and Virginia will be gratified when you see them. I could not duplicate the collection now." Most of the paintings and objects remained in Bacon's possession until her death, however, she sold and donated several works in the years directly after Edward passed.

Five major paintings were sold to Henry Clay Frick in 1916 and are presently part of the Frick Collection. She sold him all four pieces to The Four Seasons by François Boucher, and Child with Flowers by Sir Thomas Lawrence. Bacon also sold two vases to J.D. Rockefeller for a total of $30,000. After the death of her husband Walter, Bacon donated two paintings from Edward's collection to the Metropolitan Museum of Art in memory of her husband and brother-in-law. She gave The Abbe by Anthony van Dyck in honor of Edward and the portrait of herself by Anders Zorn in honor of her husband. Though her portrait remains in the museum's collection, the Van Dyck is not listed in their collection database.

In 1918, Bacon began moving forward on a project to have catalogs of her brother-in-law's collection printed. Though she died before they were published, two volumes listing and detailing Edward's collection were finished and printed in limited quantity. The collection is separated, one volume focusing on the Old Master paintings, and the other on the Chinese art and decorative objects. James B. Townsend and W. Stanton Howard prepared the catalogs and John Getz wrote the object descriptions.

During his lifetime, few people were aware of how extensive Edward's collection was because he did not like to send his paintings out for exhibitions. After his death Virginia increased public knowledge of the collection through printing the catalogs and loaning selected works to exhibitions. Indeed, one traveling exhibition of the collection, which was exhibited around New York in 1921 in cities like Buffalo and Rochester, was described as "decidedly the most interesting exhibition of the year" by an American Art News reporter. The selection contained works by Raeburn, Romney, Turner, Fragonard, and Watteau.

== Bequests and legacy of her estate ==
Virginia P. Bacon's most enduring legacy is that of the estate she left upon her death, and the many bequests she detailed in her will. A New York Times article titled "$1,840,454 Left by Vanderbilt Heiress" specified that she left $869,955 worth of art, and had a personal estate of $987,076. Her jewelry alone was valued at $39,378. She left varying sums and personal items to family members and friends, but the largest bequest ($347,477) went to her nephew Harold Oakley Barker.

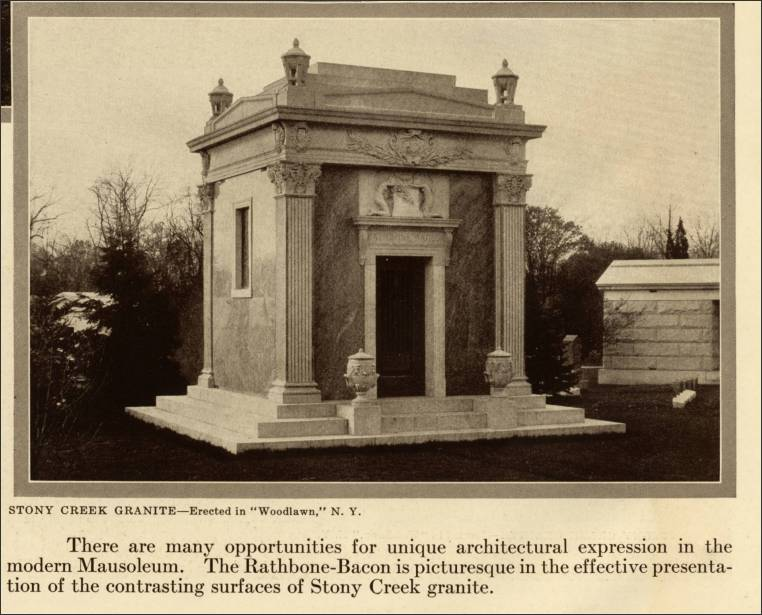
The Bacon Mausoleum in Woodlawn Cemetery (Bronx)

With two of her public bequests Bacon founded important academic scholarships. She willed $50,000 to Harvard University to begin a scholarship for painting in honor of Edward Bacon. The Edward R. Bacon painting scholarship was intended to allow students to travel to Europe to study. Similarly, the scholarship she funded in the name of her late husband, Walter Bacon, was specified as a traveling scholarship. Bacon willed $50,000 to the Smithsonian Institution to create the Walter Rathbone Bacon traveling scholarship for the study of fauna in countries other than the United States. This scholarship received heavy praise from employees of the Smithsonian Institution. The National Museum (as the Smithsonian was called at the time) Annual Report included that the scholarship was "hailed as a first step in the right direction" in the effort to correct the imbalance of information on fauna of the world. Bacon left $50,000 and a painting of Clarence Barker to All Souls Church in Biltmore, North Carolina and $25,000 to Columbia University. In addition she willed a portrait of herself to the Museum of Fine Arts in Bordeaux, France.

On December 12, 1919 there was a sale in London that included paintings from Bacon's estate. The sale was conducted by Christie, Manson & Woods, and included 40 paintings from Edward's collection. Thirty-one years later on March 2, 1950, the estate of Virginia P. Bacon was again auctioned, this time in New York. Four paintings from her estate were noted in the auction catalog. Her name is one of the few advertised on the inside cover of the catalog.
