= Edward R. Bacon =

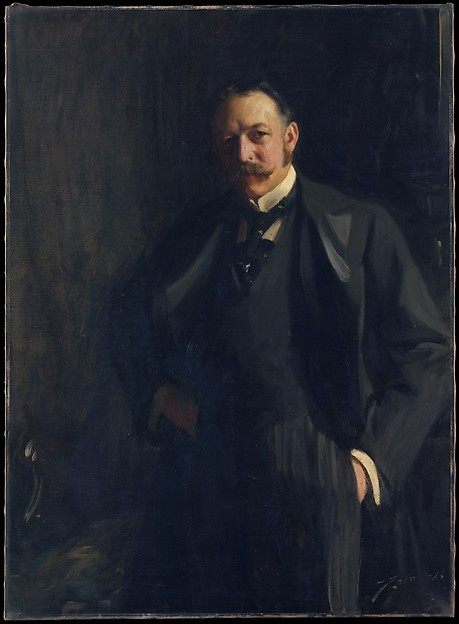
- Zorn's 1897 portrait of Bacon
- Born: November 22, 1848; Le Roy, New York
- Died: December 2, 1915 (aged 67); Baltimore, Maryland
- Other names: E.R. Bacon
- Occupation(s): Lawyer, financier

Edward Rathbone Bacon (born in Le Roy, New York, on November 22, 1848) was president of a railroad, lawyer and financier. His father was David Rinaldo Bacon and his mother was Elizabeth Rathbone. He had four siblings, Walter Rathbone, Lathrup Rufus, John Ganson, and Mary Sibley Bacon. Bacon never married or had children. Bacon served as the vice-president of the Baltimore and Ohio Railroad, and as the president of the Baltimore and Ohio Southwestern Railroad. He also worked as a lawyer and financier. Bacon died on December 2, 1915, in Baltimore, Maryland, as a result of an appendicitis operation he had a week earlier.

Bacon's main residence was 247 5th Avenue, New York, where he lived with his brother Walter and his sister-in-law Virginia P. Bacon. He is also reported to have lived in Buffalo for a time. Bacon worked out of an office at 2 Wall Street in New York. He traveled often to Europe, which is where he purchased many of the works that made up his extensive art collection. He was included in the list of notable people arriving from Europe to New York City in the New York Times on October 13, 1895.

== Career ==
Edward Bacon was educated at Phillips Exeter Academy in Exeter, New Hampshire. In 1869 he was admitted to the Bar in Buffalo, New York. Bacon lived and worked in Buffalo for a time, where he "achieved success as a lawyer." In around 1881 he moved to New York City and became Vice-President of the Cincinnati, Washington, & Baltimore Railroad. From 1890 to 1902 he was the President of the Cincinnati, Washington, and Baltimore Railroad, which was later called the Baltimore and Ohio Southwestern Railroad. In fact, "it was through his efforts that the Cincinnati, Washington & Baltimore branch of the road was built," according to Bacon's New York Times obituary. In 1896 he was appointed as the Chairman of the Board of Directors of the Baltimore and Ohio Railroad.

Bacon counseled various railway companies in law matters before and during his posts at Baltimore and Ohio Southwestern Railroad and Baltimore and Ohio Railroad. In 1881 he joined the firm Field, Dorsheimer, Deyo, and Bacon. The companies he counseled include Baltimore and Ohio Railroad Company, Consolidated Coal Company, West Virginia and Pittsburgh Railroad Company, and Vicksburg, Shreveport & Pacific Railroad Company. Bacon was known as "one of the best-known financiers in the country."

Additional posts include director of the Farmer's Loan and Trust Company, director of the Inter-borough Rapid Transit Company in New York, director of Knickerbocker Apartment Company, director of the Kansas City Southern Railway, and of the Cincinnati, Hamilton, and Dayton Railway.

== Art collection ==
Edward Bacon owned an extensive collection of Old Master paintings and Chinese art objects. He was private about his collecting, and he "never consented to lend pictures from his collection for public exhibition." An article in American Art News published after Bacon's death stated that "It is passing strange that no journal, in the many obituaries of Edward R. Bacon that have been widely published as of late, has even alluded to him as an art collector, and yet he was well known to the art world as an art lover and collector of note."

Bacon began collecting about 25 years before his death. It started in an "unostentatious way...rather as an accessory to contribute in some dignified way to the appearance of his home. Bacon was generally interested in collecting works by the Old Masters and Chinese art objects. He was interested in "the quaint and loveable" and preferred "light and gay" pictures, and anything "full of vivacity." He first collected paintings from well-known artists of his day, and then moved on to French 18th century works. Next, he began collecting 18th century English portraits. Later, he turned to the Italian primitives, a group "that does not attract the uncultivated." In reference to his collection of Chinese art, John Getz wrote that Edward Bacon was "among those connoisseurs who long ago recognized the beauty and intrinsic worth of Chinese art as manifested in ceramics, cloisonné, bronze…" Getz also mentioned a "reliable agent abroad" who aided Bacon in discovering and purchasing these artworks. He could possibly be referring to Mr. Eugene Fischhof of Paris, who is known to have worked with Bacon. Bacon kept his collection in the Upper East Side apartment he shared with his brother and sister-in-law.

Notable works in Bacon's collection included:

- The Four Seasons by François Boucher
- Portrait of Mrs. Hart by Henry Raeburn
- Portrait of Rigaud by Jean-Antoine Watteau
- Señorita Tuzo by Francisco Goya

In 1919 a catalog detailing all works in Bacon's collection was published in limited quantity. The catalog's creation was the idea of his sister-in-law, Virginia P. Bacon, though she did not live to see the two-volume catalog published. An American Art News reporter wrote, in a review of the books, that "The catalogs have a literary character and differ from the ordinary sale and collection catalogs in that they give interesting pen pictures of the works listed and illustrated, and copious footnotes."

== Club memberships and society presence ==
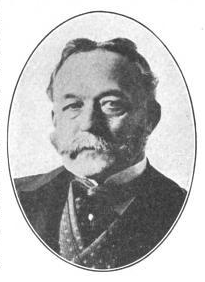
Edward R. Bacon, as pictured in the Railway Age Gazette obituary

Bacon was a member of many New York clubs, including the Manhattan Club, Union Club, the Metropolitan Art Museum, the Tuxedo Club, the New York Yacht Club, and the Racquet and Tennis Club. He was a member of the Academy of Political Science in New York in 1912. Bacon also held box 18 at the Metropolitan Opera on odd Mondays. He was a member of several automobile-centered clubs, such as the Automobile of America, and the Royal Automobile Club of England.

In addition, Bacon was a well-known man in both the United States and England. He was included in Who's Who in America in 1907, in Herringshaw's American Blue Book of Biography in 1914, and in Who's Who in New York City and State in 1914. In 1913 an article in the New York Times states that Edward Bacon could not attend a large charity ball in London, as he had "left the Ritz" and was "sailing for New York" after having recovered from an automobile accident.

== Death and estate ==
Bacon died at the Johns Hopkins Hospital in Baltimore, Maryland on December 2, 1915. His death was due to complications after an operation for appendicitis. Sources estimate that his estate was worth $2,000,000 at the time of his death. He made bequests totaling around $1,000,000 to relatives and employees, and specified that the rest of the estate, including his collection of paintings, be shared equally between his brother Walter R. Bacon and his sister-in-law Virginia P. Bacon. Bequests included $400,000 to both his sister Mary B. Allen and his brother John G. Bacon, and his cousins and nieces each received $50,000 and $40,000, respectively. He also bequeathed varying sums to his cook, secretary, valet, footman, and maids.
