= Bristol Tramways =

Defunct tram system in Bristol, England (1875–1941)

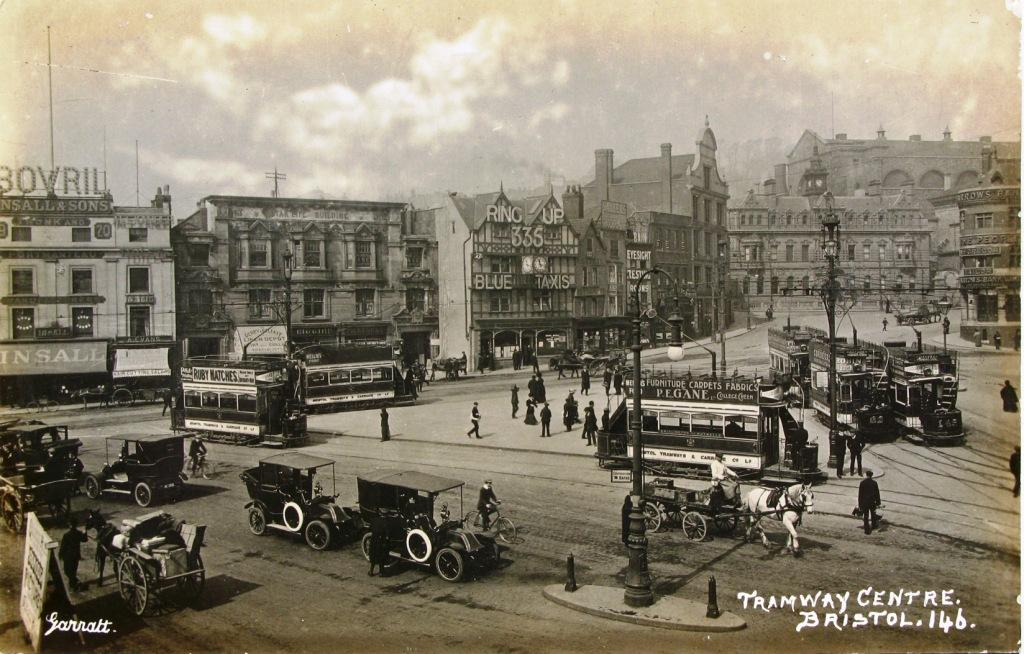
- The Tramways Centre

Overview
- Headquarters: Bristol
- Locale: England
- Dates of operation: 1875–1941
- Successor: Abandoned

Bristol Tramways operated in the city of Bristol, England from 1875, when the Bristol Tramways Company was formed by Sir George White, until 1941 when a Luftwaffe bomb destroyed the main power supply cables.

== History ==
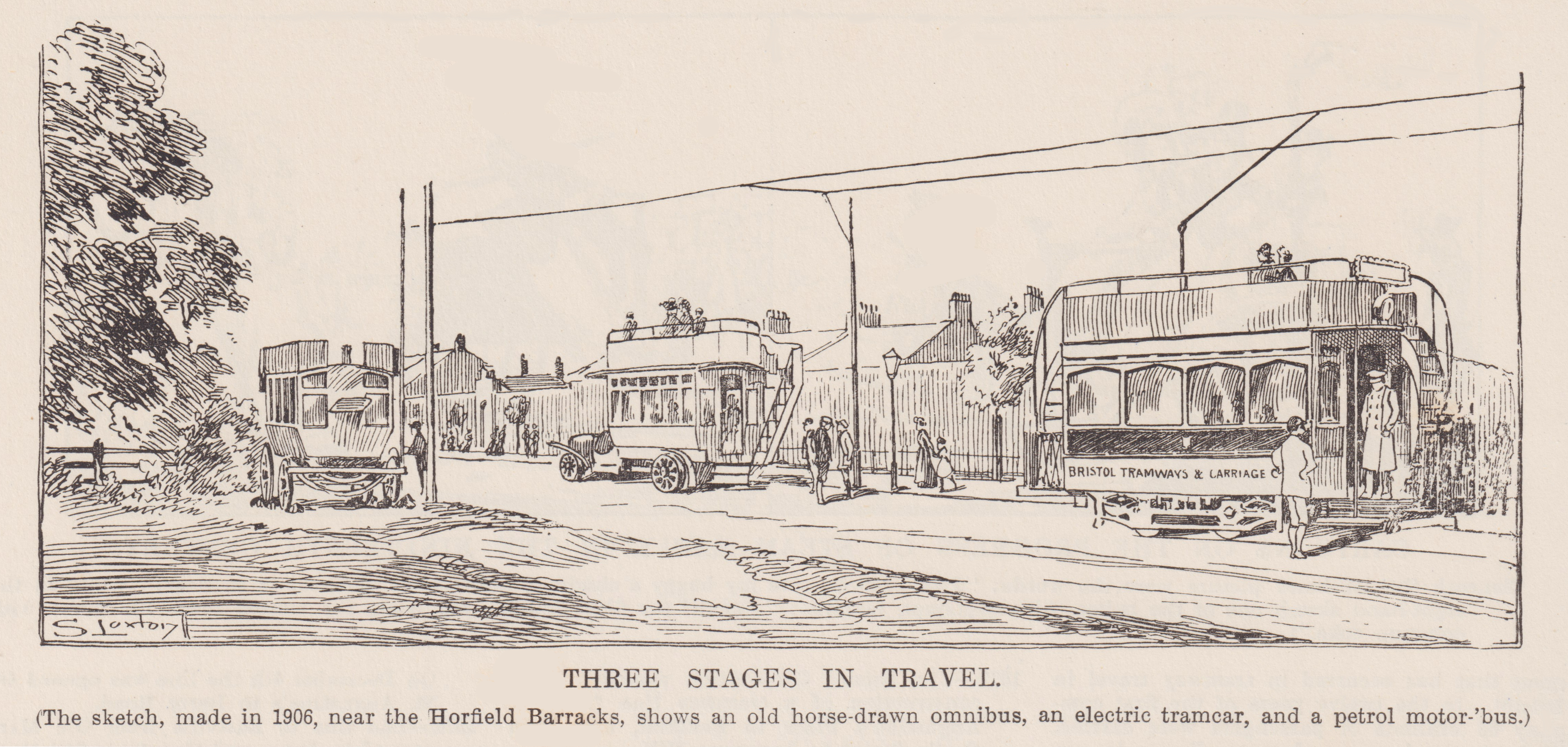
Edwardian illustration of the three stages in travel in Bristol

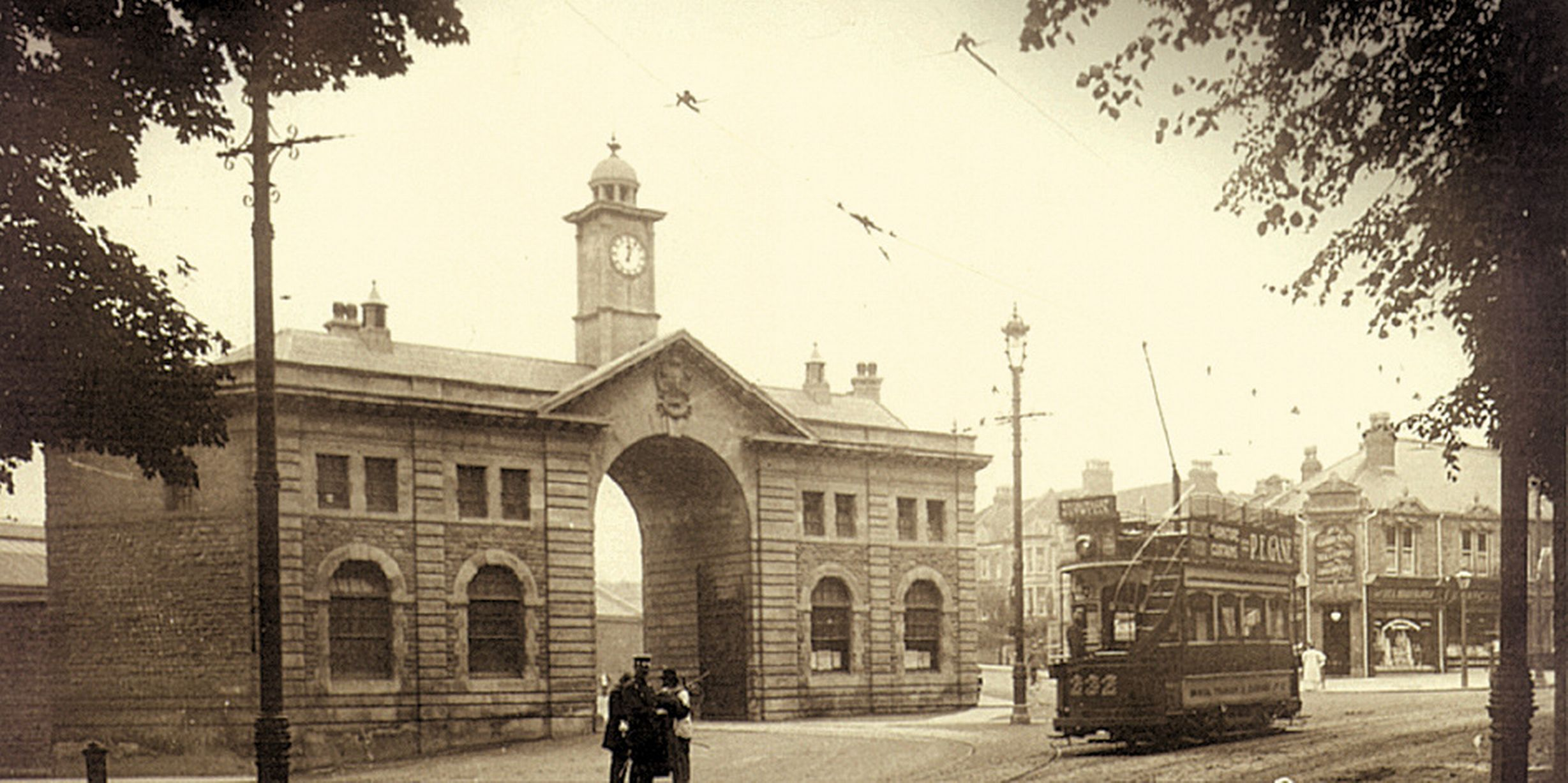
Brislington Tram Depot circa 1900

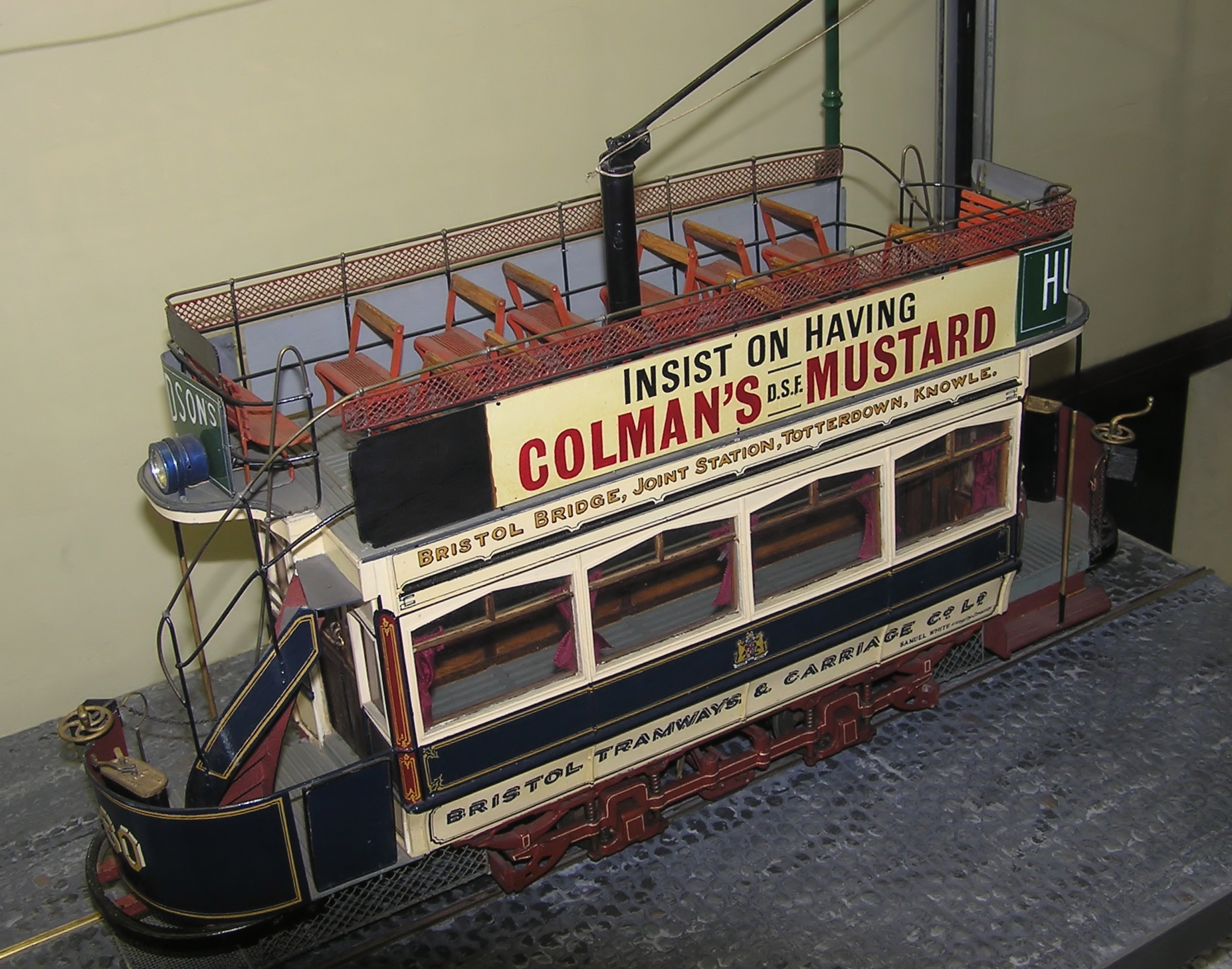
A scale model of an 1899 Bristol electric tram. Note that the driver stood in the open.

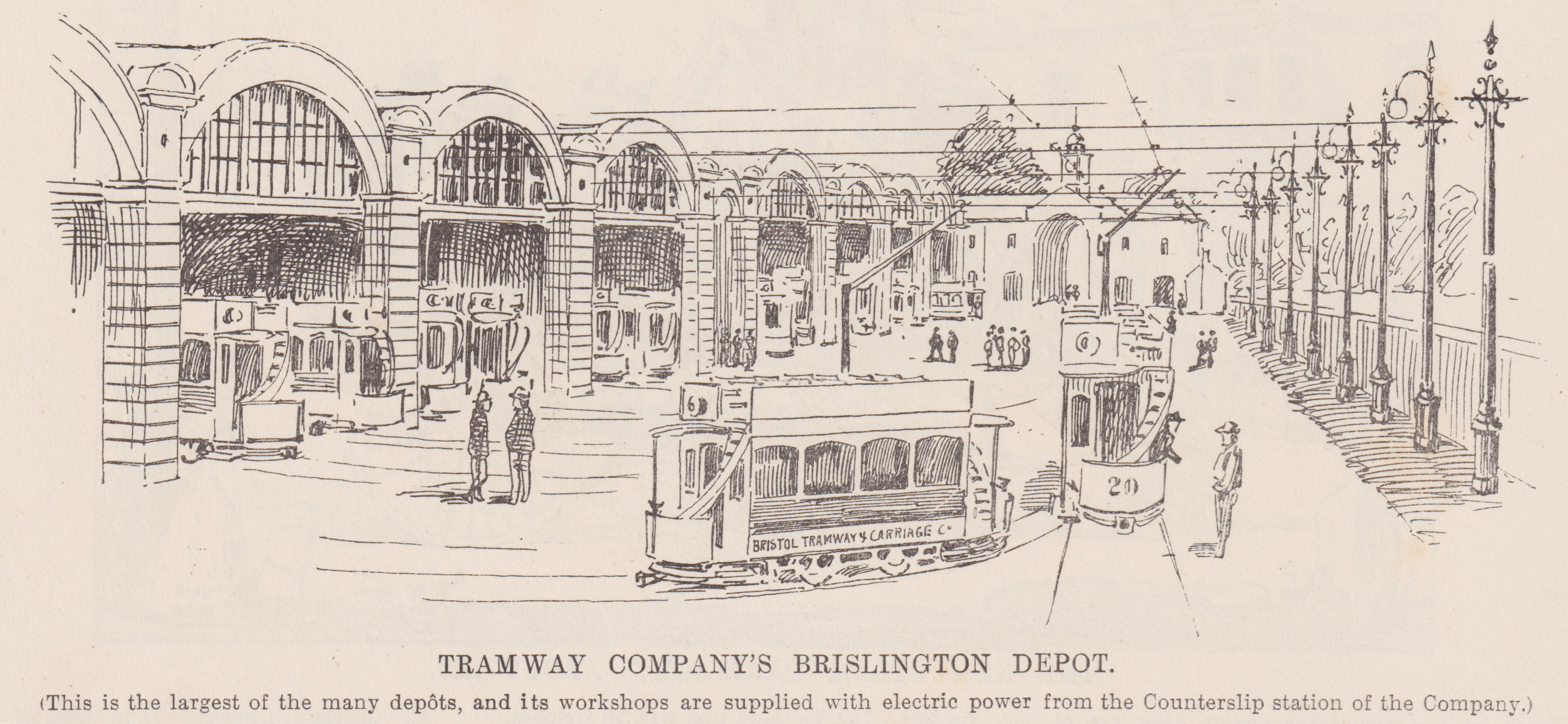
Brislington Depot, 1908

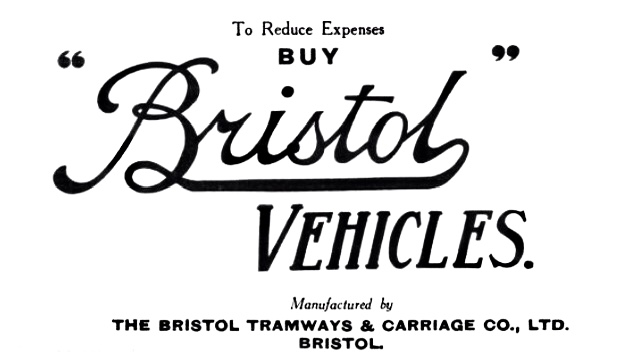
Bristol Vehicles logo

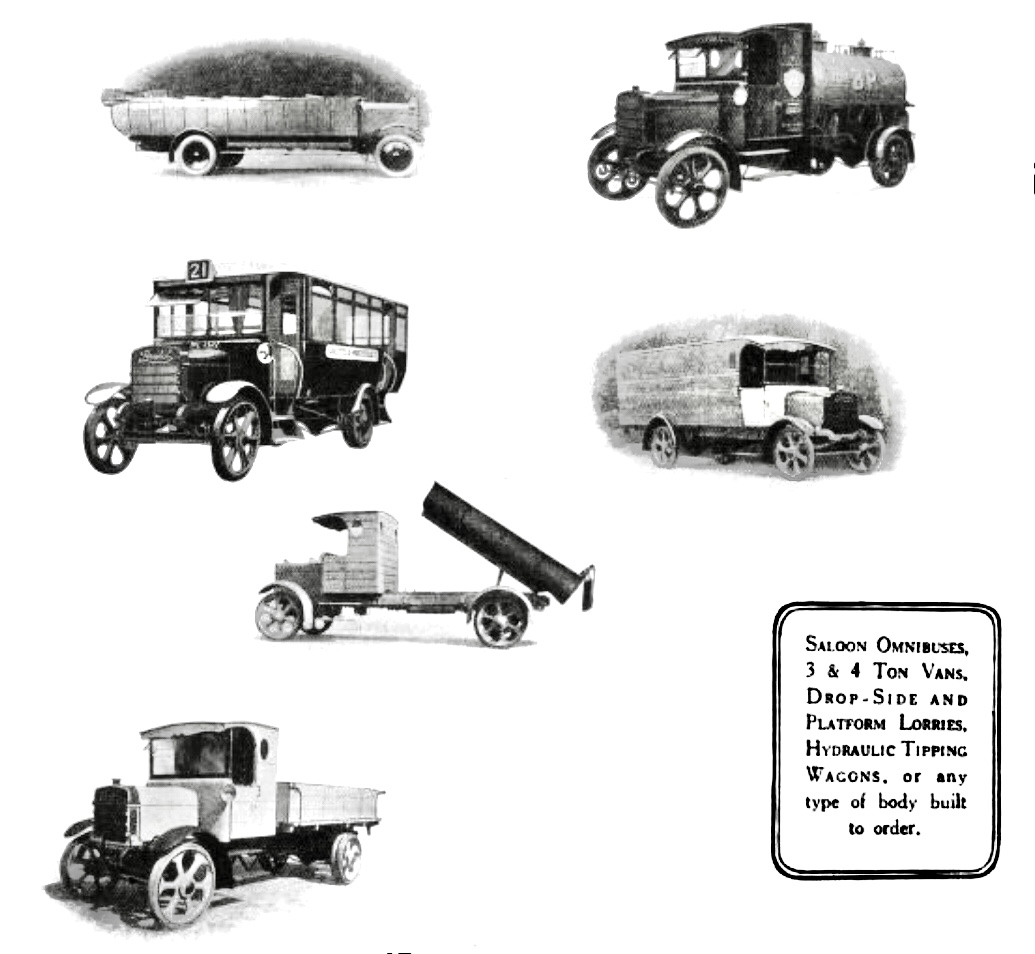
Bristol Tramways Vehicles

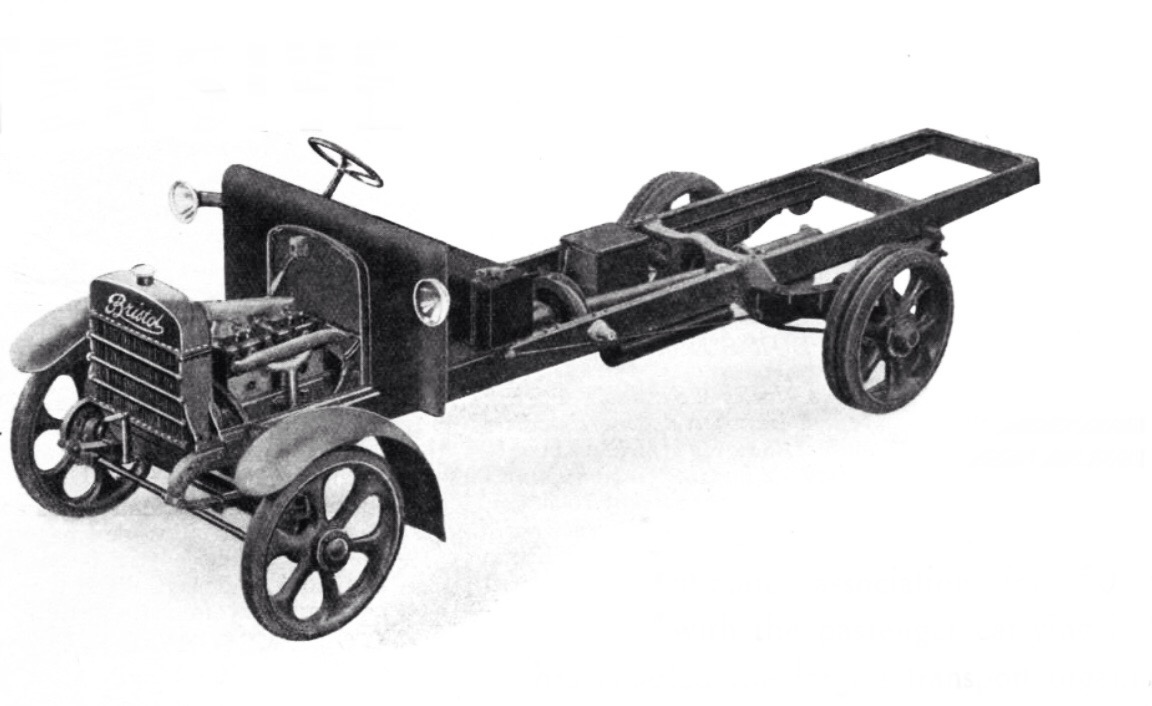
Bristol Tramways Chassis

The first trams in Bristol (horse-drawn, with a maximum speed of 6 miles per hour) were introduced in 1875. Electric trams were introduced in 1895, the first city to do so in the United Kingdom. At the system's peak there were 17 routes and 237 tramcars in use.

In 1887 the Bristol Tramways Company merged with the Bristol Cab Company to form the Bristol Tramways and Carriage Company. The new company developed a fleet of omnibuses to serve the rest of the city and country areas. In 1912 it bought the Clifton Rocks Railway. In 1929 the White family sold its controlling interest in the company to the Great Western Railway, but by 1932 control had passed to the Thomas Tilling Group. William Verdon Smith (nephew of Sir George White) remained as chairman but was replaced in 1935 by J.F. Heaton of Thomas Tilling, so he could concentrate on the Bristol Aeroplane Company.

In 1937 control of Bristol's tramways passed to a joint committee of the Bristol Tramways company and Bristol Corporation.

== Closure ==
Abandonment of the tramways began in 1938, but this was halted at the outbreak of World War II. Tram operations ceased in 1941 following the Luftwaffe's Good Friday air raids during the Bristol Blitz, which set central Bristol on fire. A bomb hit Counterslip bridge, St Philips, next to the Tramways generating centre, and severed the tram power supply. The final tram from Old Market to Kingswood was given a push by passers-by and freewheeled its way into the depot.

Almost all Bristol's trams were scrapped; however, one is preserved at Filton by Aerospace Bristol, formerly the Bristol Aero Collection. Another memorial to the system is a length of tram track still embedded in St Mary Redcliffe churchyard, where it was blown by a bomb. Two lengths of intact track can be seen at the car park of the Gloucester Road Medical Centre, and a short section of track still exists on the approach to Bristol Temple Meads railway station. Another section of track used to be still in place near Castle Park, but this was lost when the area was redeveloped as part of the Cabot Circus development.

The Bristol Tramways company continued as a bus operator, but the name was not changed to Bristol Omnibus Company until 1957.

== Routes ==
The electric tram routes were not numbered until November 1913. They were then numbered as follows:

1. Tramways Centre – Whiteladies Road – Durdham Downs
2. Tramways Centre – Whiteladies Road – Durdham Downs – Westbury
3. Eastville – Old Market – Whiteladies Road – Durdham Downs
4. Tramways Centre – Zetland Road – Durdham Downs
5. Tramways Centre – Ashley Down Road – Horfield Barracks
6. Tramways Centre – Ashley Down Road – Horfield Barracks – Filton Park – Filton
7. Tramways Centre – Warwick Road – Eastville – Fishponds
8. Tramways Centre – Temple Meads Station
9. Hotwells – Tramways Centre – Temple Meads Station – Arno's Vale – Depot – Brislington
10. Bristol Bridge – Knowle
11. Bristol Bridge – Ashton Road
12. Bristol Bridge – Bedminster Depot – Bedminster Down
13. Tramways Centre – Old Market – St. George – Whiteway Rd – Kingswood
14. Zetland Road – Old Market – Eastville – Fishponds – Staple Hill
15. Knowle – Bushy Park – Old Market – St. George – Marling Road – Nags Head Hill – Hanham
16. Old Market – St George
17. Hotwells – Tramways Centre – Temple Meads Station

Note that:

- Route 1 was withdrawn and absorbed into 2.
- Route 8 was withdrawn and absorbed into 9.
- Route 13 for a while did not run to the Tramways Centre but terminated at Old Market.
- Route 16 was a busy-period route only and was absorbed into 13 and 15.
- Route 17 ran to meet the P and A Campbell steamers and was withdrawn at the same time as Route 8.
- Trams did not actually run along Ashley Down Rd., Marling Rd., or Whiteway Road, and route 14 did not enter Zetland Rd.
- From 1902 to 1905, the route from Hanham, having reached Old Market, was extended to the Tramways Centre.
