= Broadway United Church of Christ =

Church in Manhattan, New York

Coordinates: 40°47′33.7″N 73°58′21.6″W

Broadway United Church of Christ is a Congregationalist Church located on West 71st Street, between Amsterdam Avenue and Columbus Avenue on the Upper West Side of Manhattan, New York City.

== Finney's Broadway Tabernacle ==
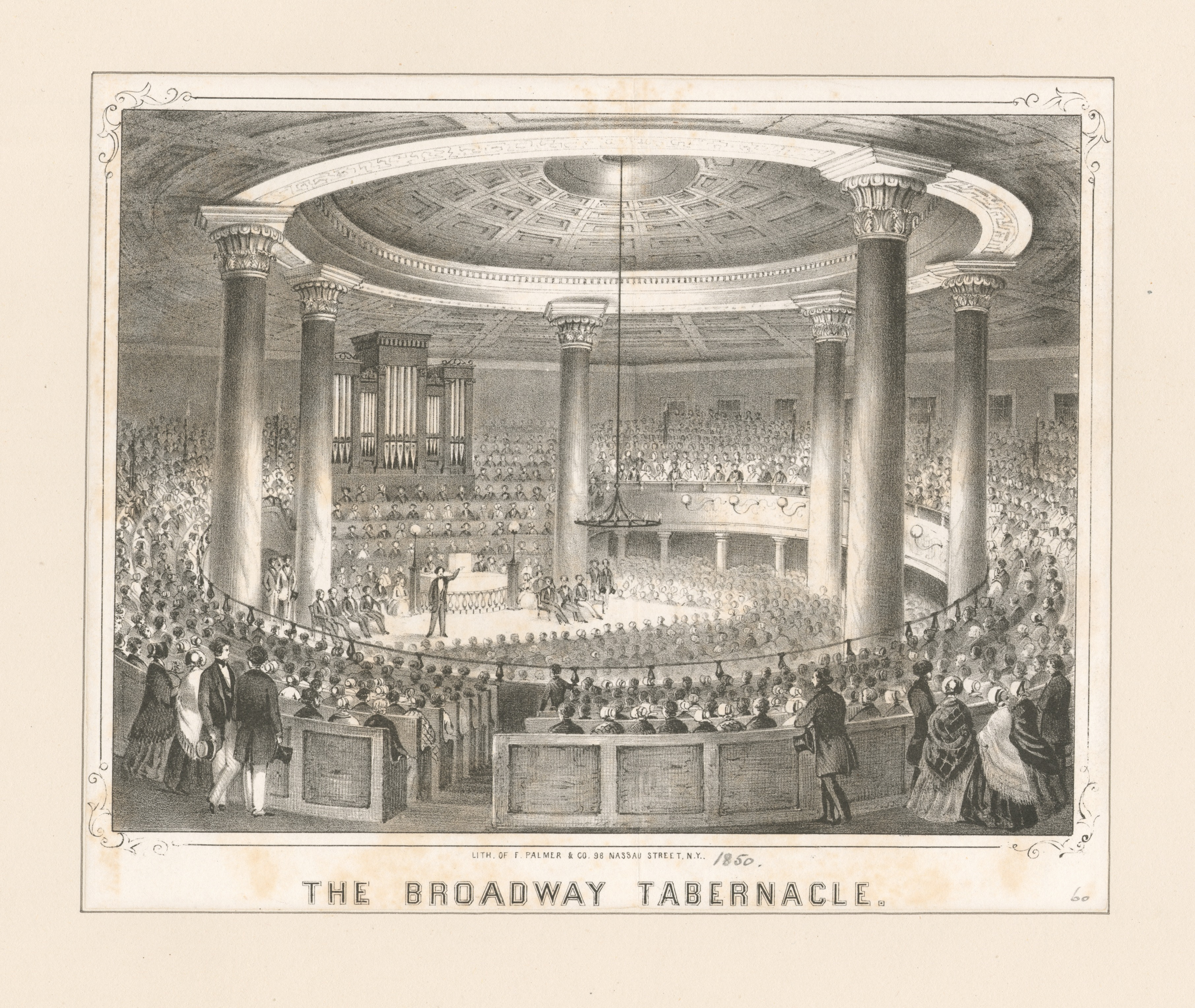
The Broadway Tabernacle circa 1850

The original Broadway Tabernacle, now known as Broadway United Church of Christ, was founded as the Second Free Presbyterian Church, organized in 1832 by Lewis Tappan for Charles Grandison Finney, a famous evangelist / revivalist from western New York. It was founded on Chatham Street (Manhattan) in lower Manhattan, New York City, in the former Chatham Garden Theatre (built 1824), which became known as the Chatham Street Chapel. This first chapel was abandoned and shortly thereafter demolished in 1836 for the purpose-built Broadway Tabernacle, which was erected in 1836. The Broadway Tabernacle was located at 340-344 Broadway, between Worth and Catherine Lane, and was considered one of the most influential churches constructed in America. Finney influenced the design; it held 2,400 people. Then a Presbyterian church, it was founded as a center of anti-slavery spirit in New York City. Finney left the church to join the Oberlin College's Theology Department in April 1837 and the Tabernacle building was demolished in 1856.

The minister who followed Finney shared neither his anti-slavery attitude nor his ability to gather the large throngs that Finney had. A dispute about this led to the church leaving the Presbyterian fold, through the purchase of the building by a prominent member, editor of The Journal of Commerce, David Hale. He reorganized the church as a Congregational church, and established policies that allowed for freedom of expression. The building was used for a wide variety of purposes, including the first demonstration of nitrous oxide (laughing gas) as an anesthetic.

In the following decades, the church became a gathering place for opponents of slavery, advocates of women's suffrage, and prohibitionists, hosting speakers like John Neal, America's first women's rights lecturer, whose speech attracted 3,000 attendees in 1843.

Leaders of the Church took a prominent role in raising a defense fund for the Africans who were captured aboard the ship Amistad; Cinque, the leader of the captives, spoke at the Church as the freed slaves prepared to return to Africa. Members of the Amistad Committee eventually formed The American Missionary Association, an organization that opposed slavery, and established schools, colleges, and churches for freed slaves after the Civil War. William Lloyd Garrison, a prominent abolitionist, and Frederick Douglass, a black newspaper editor and former slave, both spoke at the Church.

In 1839, Andrew Harris, the first African-American to graduate from the University of Vermont, and the sixth in the nation, delivered a speech to 5,000 members of the American Anti-Slavery Society, including this passage:

If the groans and sighs of the victims of slavery could be collected, and thrown out here in one volley, these walls would tremble, these pillars would be removed from their foundations, and we should find ourselves buried in the ruins of the edifice. If the blood of the innocent, which has been shed by slavery, could be poured out here, this audience might swim in it – or if they could not swim they would be drowned.

In 1853, a women's suffrage meeting at the Church was disrupted by a hostile mob, and Sojourner Truth, a conductress of the Underground Railroad, tried to answer the hecklers from the platform before the meeting broke up.

The church founded a newspaper, The Independent, an anti-slavery paper that had a circulation of 15,000, which helped to spread the renown of Emily Dickinson by publishing her poems.

== 34th Street location ==
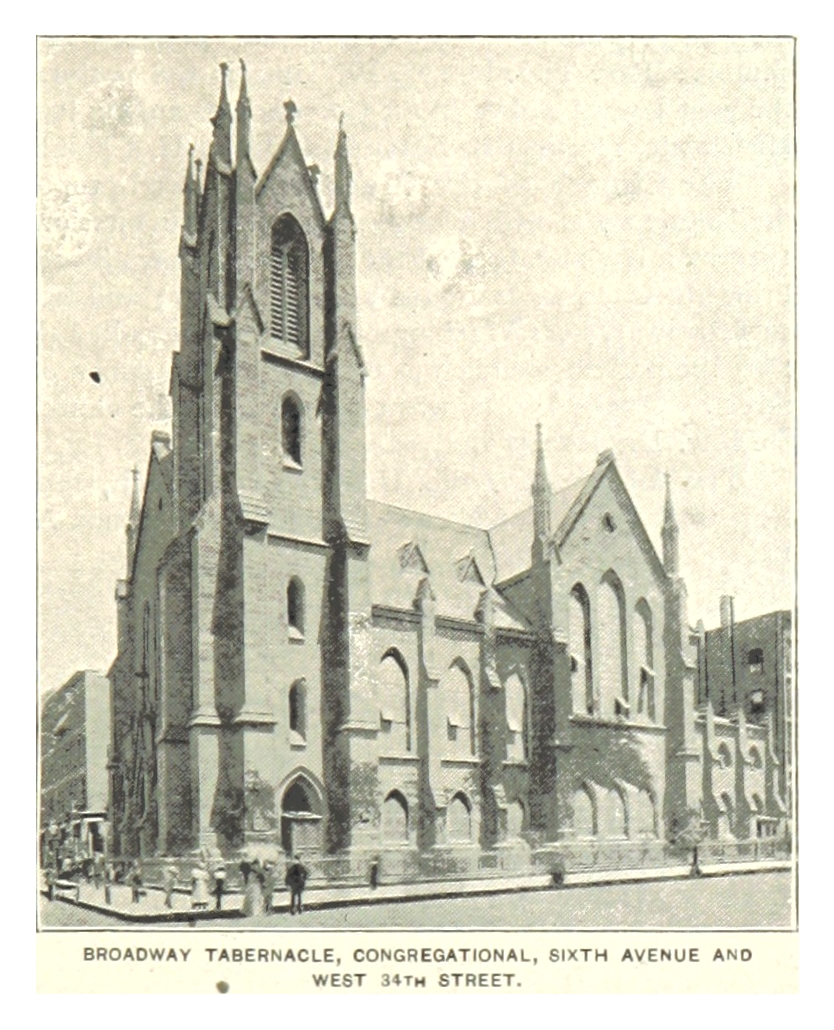
BROADWAY TABERNACLE, CONGREGATIONAL, SIXTH AVENUE AND WEST 34TH STREET

On April 26, 1857, the original Broadway Tabernacle was opened the last time for "Divine Service." The church had accepted an offer by the Erie Railroad to purchase its original building, and moved uptown to 34th Street and 6th Avenue. The new building was designed by Leopold Eidlitz. The pastor, Joseph Parrish Thompson, deemed the event significant enough to document the final services and sermons from the day in a pamphlet, "The Last Sabbath in the Broadway Tabernacle: A Historical Discourse." The final day of services began with "Pitt's Young Men's Bible Class" (a fixture at the church since the 1840s) starting at 9AM, followed by the morning service, a reunion at 3PM of those who had attended Sabbath Schools and evening service. The day included sermons by Joseph Parrish Thompson, Edwards Amasa Park, and Richard Salter Storrs, as well as an anthem composed for the occasion by William Batchelder Bradbury, a reading of Psalm 122 and Psalm 132 by George W. Wood (Secretary of the American Board of Commissioners for Foreign Missions), Prayer by Rev. Milton Badger (Secretary of the American Home Missionary Society), and a historical discourse by Joshua Leavitt. To close the event, the organ played Old 100th and the crowd of over 4000 worshipers sang Psalm 117.

As American Civil War began, the Church's pastor, Rev. Joseph Parrish Thompson, was so identified with the Union cause that a Confederate sympathizer attempted to shoot him during a worship service.

These years reflect a time when Protestant ministers were among the leaders of American society, and when their sermons would be reported in the newspapers. Churches were also significant cultural centers. For example, the Tabernacle choir performed the first North American concert of Mendelssohn's oratorio, Elijah.

Women were given the vote in the church in 1871. During the latter half of the 19th century, the Church supported mission activities around the world. It also carried out educational and religious activities in the poorer neighborhoods of the City, including Hell's Kitchen, where it established a branch, the Bethany Mission, in 1868.

In 1892, the address was listed at 582 6th Avenue; it was informally called "Rev. Dr. Taylor's Broadway Tabernacle" at that time.

== 1897–1950 ==
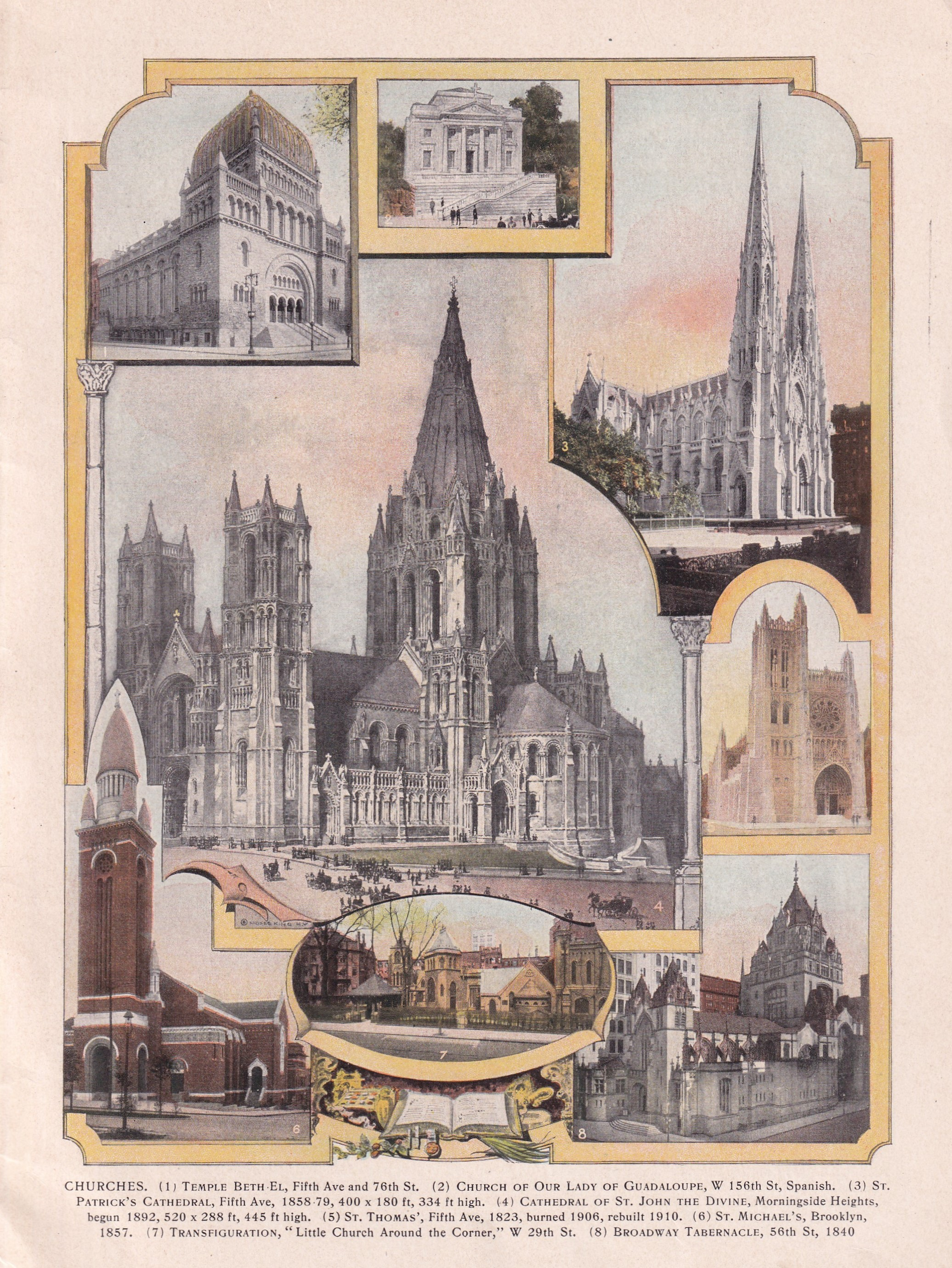
The 56th street church (bottom right)

Charles Jefferson became pastor in 1897 and continued in the role until 1930. He was a skilled preacher and organizer under whose leadership the Church grew. The City had spread beyond its former boundaries, and again a generous offer for the Church's property stimulated a move to 56th Street and Broadway, a corner where the streets were still unpaved. The Gothic building that was erected featured a parish house that was ten stories tall and had its own elevator. The "skyscraper church" functioned, as the Church had before, as a gathering place for many meetings, more than 1200 in the year 1910. During the World War I, it provided weekly canteens for men of the armed forces. During the Depression, it contained a theater, beginning a ministry to actors that lasted for many years. During 1907 and 1908, pastor Jefferson presented a series of sermons at the Broadway Tabernacle on the character of Jesus to a group of young men, many students, on Sunday Evenings. At their request, a hardbound edition of this series was published in 1936 under the title The Character of Jesus, by Thomas Y. Crowell & Co.

Mission work continued to be a focus, leading among other things to the establishment of the Jefferson Academy in Tungshien, China. Pastor Jefferson also led the establishment of the New York Congregational Home for the Aged in Brooklyn in 1906. In the same year, Jefferson also proclaimed his interest in peace issues, as one of the founders of the New York Peace Society. Andrew Carnegie gave Jefferson and his colleagues a grant to develop strong relationships between clergy throughout the world. After the First World War, Jefferson became an advocate for the League of Nations and the World Court.

In 1928, Broadway continued to break new ground by taking the rare action of ordaining a woman minister. Two years later, Jefferson left, and Allan Knight Chalmers was offered the job of replacing him. Women now demanded, and were given, the ability to serve as officers of the Church. Chalmers was a strong advocate of the Social Gospel; as the Great Depression deepened, he and the Church had many challenges to meet. One of the great public controversies of the time was the Scottsboro case, when a group of nine black men were charged with sexually molesting some white women in Scottsboro, Alabama. All except one were sentenced to death. Pastor Chalmers became the head of the national Scottsboro Defense Committee. The men were freed from prison; Chalmers was elected treasurer of the National Association for the Advancement of Colored People (NAACP) in recognition of his work on the case.

Pastor Chalmers was also a leader in the pacifist movement. The Church's Young Men's Club issued the Broadway Declaration in 1932, declaring that service in the armed forces was inconsistent with Christianity. Other young men across the nation also signed it. When World War II came, eight Broadway members became conscientious objectors, serving out the War in mental hospitals and other forms of community service. Without an apparent sense of contradiction, the Church during this period continued to offer regular hospitality to members of the armed forces through its weekly canteens.

== Modern Era ==
On into the 1960s, the Church continued to fight for human rights. It was the rallying point from which the United Church of Christ delegation went to the March on Washington. One of Broadway's staff members, Aston Glaves, became a leader in developing affordable housing in the church's neighborhood, formerly called Hell's Kitchen. A number of middle- and low-income apartment buildings in the area were developed through community efforts led by Glaves.

Lawrence Durgin served the Church for two years before being named pastor in 1963. During this time, the church embraced the ecumenical movement that was symbolized by the Second Vatican Council. As it confronted a large investment to repair its building, a proposal was made to sell the property and to use the money for mission. The proposal won by a very small margin. In 1969, Broadway left its own building to take up residence at a Catholic church, the nearby Church of St. Paul the Apostle.

After twelve years at St. Paul's, Broadway moved to Rutgers Presbyterian Church, and then to St. Michael's Episcopal Church, each time moving further up the West Side. The Rev. Dr. Bonnie Rosborough was called during this time, and kept the church together during its various moves. Life as a "church without walls" began to pall after thirty years, so a relationship was formed with Advent Lutheran Church at 93rd and Broadway. Broadway would invest in the renovation and repair of Advent's building, and would be able to settle there as partners in ministry. When that relationship ended, in 2016 Broadway UCC took temporary residence at the Church of St. Paul and St. Andrew (New York City), a welcoming congregation at 86th Street with a similar mission and focus. In 2022, the congregation moved to the Grace & St. Paul’s Church at 123 west 71st street as a tenant, sharing the church building with Grace & St. Paul’s Church.

In 1991, Broadway became an Open and Affirming Congregation of the United Church of Christ, officially welcoming all people regardless of their sexual orientation. Ministries to churches in South Africa as it threw off apartheid, to prisoners, to people with HIV and AIDS, and to women on welfare, among others, have marked the 1990s. Broadway members provided their labor and financial support to Habitat for Humanity as the millennium turned.

In 2006, the congregation voted to call the Rev. Dr. James P. Campbell as its 10th Pastor.

2018 Jan Rev. Jeff Mansfield was called as interim minister.

In 2019, the congregation voted to call the Rev. Dr. Michael S. Piazza as its 11th Pastor.

In 2023, Rev. Rebecca Pridmore became a "designated pastor" under three-year designated term call.

In 2026, the congregation voted to call the Rev. Rebecca Pridmore as its 12th Pastor.
