= Joseph Parrish Thompson =

- Born: August 7, 1819; Philadelphia, Pennsylvania, US
- Died: September 20, 1879 (aged 60); Berlin, Germany
- Education: Yale University, 1838; Harvard University DD degree (Divinitatis Doctor, Doctor of Divinity), 1856; University of New York, LLD, 1868
- Occupations: abolitionist, Congregationalist minister, author
- Known for: pastor, Broadway Tabernacle Church (New York) (1845–1871)
- Spouse(s): Lucy Olivia Bartlett (?–1852); Elizabeth Coit Gilman
- Children: 6, including William Gilman Thompson

Joseph Parrish Thompson (1819–1879) was an American abolitionist and Congregationalist minister. He was pastor of the Broadway Tabernacle Church in New York from 1845 to 1871, (also known as Broadway United Church of Christ and Second Free Presbyterian Church). His major life accomplishments include founding The Independent, an anti-slavery religious weekly started in 1848, contributing and managing The New Englander (later re-named the Yale Review), served as president of the American Union Commission, being a member of the committee to create the New York Metropolitan Museum of Art, played a major role in the development of 20 Congregational churches in Manhattan and Brooklyn. and assisted the Treaty of Berlin with the religious liberty clause.

== Biography ==
Joseph Parrish Thompson was born in Philadelphia, August 7, 1819, the son of Isaac Thompson and Mary Ann (Hanson). He graduated from Yale University in 1838, having been a member of Skull and Bones. He pursued further theological studies at Andover Theological Seminary and New Haven, and was ordained pastor of the Chapel Street church in New Haven in November 1840.

Joseph Parrish Thompson was pastor of the Chapel street church in New Haven from 1840 to 1845. During his years at New Haven, he was one of the originators of The New Englander, a Congregational quarterly review, later renamed the Yale Review.

He was called to the pastoral charge of the Broadway Tabernacle church, at one time the largest building in New York City, in 1845. He served there as pastor from 15 April of that year until 1871. Dr. Thompson preached the church's anti-slavery beliefs, supporting women's suffrage (voting) and promoting the abolition of alcoholic drinks. He frequently preached to a congregation of 2,500 parishioners. Black pastors were invited as guest preachers. William Lloyd Garrison, Frederick Douglass, and Sojourner Truth spoke at the church. Rioters tried to burn the church and Dr. Thompson's home in 1863, but they were stopped by members of the congregation. A Confederate sympathizer attempted to shoot Dr. Thompson during a worship service because of his deep loyalty to the Union. During his time at the Broadway Tabernacle, he also played a major role in the development of 20 Congregational churches in Manhattan and Brooklyn. Dr. Thompson convened the first national meeting of Congregational churches in Albany in 1852. About 500 ministers and delegates from 17 different states attended this historical gathering. Thompson supported mission activities around the world. The church carried out educational and religious activities in poor neighborhoods of New York City, including Hell's Kitchen, where it established the Bethany Mission in 1868. He also served as manager of the American Congregational Union and of the American Home Missionary Society.

During 1848 until 1861 The Independent was edited by: Dr. Thompson, Richard Salter Storrs, and Leonard Bacon. The publication's goal was to promote Congregationalism and was also an important voice in support of abolitionism and women's suffrage. The Independent published Emily Dickinson's poems and helped her become more prominent.

Dr. Thompson often traveled to Washington, DC, where he spoke with President Abraham Lincoln about issues related to the Civil War. Thompson collaborated further with President Lincoln through his work as president of the Christian Union Commission (also known as the American Union Commission).

Joseph Parrish Thompson was one of the initial members of the Union League. Doctor Thompson's address "Revolution Against Free Government, Not A Right, But A Crime" about the rights of man and the principles of free government, delivered before the Union League Club in 1884 is considered instrumental to the club's goal of supporting the Union and abolition. The Union Leagues were a group of men's clubs established during the American Civil War to promote loyalty to the Union, the Republican Party, and the policies of Abraham Lincoln. The founders aimed to win the political governing elite over to support of the Union and abolition. They also believed that a centralized government was essential to their prosperity. Members of The Union League Club were instrumental in establishing The Metropolitan Museum of Art in 1870, Dr. Thompson was a member of the committee and founder of the museum. He was one of the speakers at the initial meeting held to discuss its foundation.

In 1852, after the death of his first wife, Lucy Olivia Bartlett Thompson, he went to Palestine, Egypt, and other countries in Asia and Africa. He made subsequent, studies and writings about the Orient, and he became well known as art authority in Egyptology. Many of his writings were printed in the North American Review, the Bibliotheca Sacra, the Journal of the American Geographical and Statistical Society, in Smith's Dict. of the Bible, and the revised edition of Kitto's Cyclop. of Biblical Literature. He published Egypt, Past and Present, in 1856.

He was the brother-in-law of Daniel Coit Gilman, having married, as his second wife, Gilman's sister Elizabeth.

At a time when the Union Army desperately needed regiments, Dr. Thompson united the parish to contribute $30,000 for a new regiment.

His son, Sgt John Hanson Thompson died during the civil war. He was a member of the Union Army Co. A; 106th Regiment, New York Infantry (Sergeant). Dr. Thompson wrote a book of him entitled The Sergeant's Memorial, by his Father. His son was 21 when he died.

After President Lincoln's assassination, Mary Todd Lincoln gave Dr. Thompson one of the president's canes. He, in turn, left it to the New York Historical Society. This walking cane had been the property of Henry Clay of Kentucky. He had received it from Judge William H. Robinson of Missouri, Robinson had gifted it to Mr. Cassius M. Clay of Kentucky, and Mr. Clay had given it to President Lincoln. The president's widow gave it to Rev. Dr. Thompson, "as a friend who her husband greatly honored."

Rev. Thompson was one of the main speakers at the funeral ceremonies for president Abraham Lincoln held in New York city in Union Square. He also delivered a notable eulogy for the President before the Union League Club.

The tremendous energy Dr. Thompson extended on behalf of the war effort, the abolition of slavery and his ministries at the Tabernacle, exhausted him, and he found it necessary to submit his resignation in late 1871. He moved to Germany in 1873.

During the differences between Otto Von Bismarck and Pope Pius IX, at the request of prince Bismarck, he prepared and published a work on the relations of Church and State in America. He also wrote "The Attitude of Germany in Regard to Ultramontanism," for which the Bismarck thanked him personally.

When Bayard Taylor died, Dr. Thompson was nominated as a minister of the German government in Berlin. He declined this position, however. He spoke French and German very well, and frequently had occasion to lecture in those languages in the public addresses which he delivered in Europe.

In 1878, influenced by Dr. Thompson, the Berlin Congress inserted a religious liberty clause in the Treaty of Berlin, based on An Essay Toward Principles of International law to Govern the Intercourse of Christian with Non-Christian Peoples. This essay was presented at the Conference of the "Association for the Reform and Codification of the Law of Nations", at Bremen in September 1876.

From 1873 until his death in 1879 he lived in Berlin.

== American Union Commission (Christian Union Commission) ==
The American Union Commission was formed in 1864 by Reverend Joseph P. Thompson, D.D., and Reverend William I. Buddington, D.D. when they visited Tennessee as delegates of the Christian Commission. During the visit, both witnessed the terrible conditions of the country, and saw the great necessity of forming an organization to aid in rebuilding the places hurt by war, as well as the need of help to those who had suffered from it. They consulted with Andrew Johnson, then military Governor of Tennessee, who agreed with them on its importance. The reverends then returned to New York to form a partial plan and discussed it with leading citizens of the city. After the plan was set forth, they met with President Lincoln personally who approved the plan enthusiastically and participated in the proposed constitution. The War Department then gave the commission the same facilities of transportation it had awarded to the Sanitary and Christian Commissions. After the death of President Lincoln, Andrew Johnson succeeded as President of the United States, and continued supporting the commission.

"The principal work of the AUC was practical relief. In 1884 it sent donated clothing and blankets to Arkansas, Tennessee, North Carolina, and Florida, adding stoves to its shipments to Memphis and Tennessee. It also provided assistance for the thousands of southern refugees who streamed into New York at the end of the war, renting a large building on 24th Street to house the women and children. To accommodate them in transit, the AUC placed beds on two steamers working between New York and Southern ports."

"The U. S. Christian Commission was formed ...to provide to the armies and navies comforts and supplies not furnished by the Federal Government. It received its support primarily from the churches. During the four years of the Civil War it collected more than $2,500,000 in cash, besides immense quantities of stores and clothing. Needless to say, it was popular with the troops."

== Works ==
Joseph Parrish Thompson was the author of a number of works, including:

- The Right and Necessity of Inflicting the Punishment of Death for Murder (1842)
- The Fugitive Slave Law: Tried by the Old and New Testaments (1850)
- Photographic Views of Egypt, Past and Present (1856)
- The Christian Graces (1859)
- Constitution of the African Civilization Society: Together With the Testimony of Forty Distinguished Citizens of New York and Brooklyn (1861)
- The Sergeant's Memorial (1863)
- The Psalter and the Sword (1863)
- Christianity and Emancipation, Or, The Teachings and the Influence of the Bible Against Slavery (1863)
- Revolution Against Free Government - Not a Right But a Crime (1864)
- Bryant Gray (1864)
- The Holy Comforter: His Person and His Work (1866)
- Man in Genesis and Geology (1870), a work addressing issues of science and faith in the light of Darwinism
- The Theology of Christ: From His Own Words (1871)
- Church and state in the United States: with an appendix on the German population (1873)
- Lucretius or Paul: Materialism and Theism Tested by the Nature and the Needs of Man (1875)
- Let the Cannon Blaze Away (1876), six lectures that were given in five leading cities in Europe on the United States' centennial
- The Workman: His False Friends and His True Friends (1879)
- "No slavery in Nebraska. The voice of God against national crime" (1854)
