= Leonard Woolsey Bacon =

American clergyman

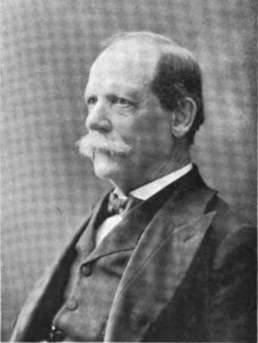
- Born: January 1, 1830; New Haven, Connecticut
- Died: May 12, 1907 (aged 77); Assonet, Massachusetts
- Resting place: Grove Street Cemetery
- Education: Yale University
- Occupations: Clergyman, writer
- Children: Benjamin Wisner Bacon

Leonard Woolsey Bacon (January 1, 1830 – May 12, 1907) was an American clergyman, born in New Haven, Connecticut. He was a social commentator and a prolific author on religious, social, and historical matters. In social, political, and religious issues of his times, he often broke with the traditions of his countrymen, sometimes causing "great sensation."

== Biography ==
Leonard Woolsey Bacon was a son of the Congregationalist preacher Leonard Bacon, a brother of George B. Bacon of Orange, New Jersey, and Edward Woolsey Bacon, and a half-brother of Thomas Rutherford Bacon of New Haven, Connecticut, all Congregational preachers. He graduated from Yale University in 1850, and in 1856 was ordained in Litchfield. He was also pastor of the First Church in Stamford, Connecticut (1862–65), and of the New England Congregational Church in Brooklyn, New York (1865–70).

Subsequently, he spent several years in Europe, chiefly in Geneva, as a student, preacher, and writer; in Geneva he spent part of his time preaching to "Americans sojourning there." From 1878 to 1882 he was pastor of the Park Congregational Church in Norwich, Connecticut, and later of other Congregational and Presbyterian churches. In 1887, he was the pastor of the Independent Presbyterian Church in Savannah, Georgia. In 1898, he was pastor of the First Church in Litchfield, Connecticut. He was pastor of the North Church in Assonet, Massachusetts beginning in 1901, and authored a history of the churches of Freetown, Massachusetts in 1902. He died at Assonet, May 12, 1907, and was buried in Grove Street Cemetery, New Haven, Connecticut.

== Controversial statements ==
Bacon evidently enjoyed getting involved in contemporary issues, such as divorce, temperance, Sunday rest, and the public conduct of officers of the United States armed forces. In many of these matters, however, he displayed a reluctance to impose religious views. When, in 1880, he wrote an open letter to The New York Times complaining about a steamboat company that evaded Connecticut's blue laws, he made it clear that laws mandating Sunday as a mandatory day of rest were not to be construed as endorsing any particular religion or discriminating "in favor of church-going."

Bacon appeared to have had a habit of causing controversy. In 1884, for instance, he felt compelled, in another letter to the Times, to state that contrary to reports he was not in favor of "a uniform, universal divorce law throughout the States." In 1887, when he was the pastor of the Independent Presbyterian Church in Savannah, he caused a stir by publicly declaring that he favored mixed (black and white) schools and that he would not mind his daughter being seen walking with an African American or even marrying one.

In 1898, as pastor in Litchfield, Connecticut, he wrote a letter published in The New York Times chastising Captain Robley Dunglison Evans (known as "Fighting Bob"), later admiral in the United States Navy, for boasting and profanity. Evidently this was part of a feud of sorts; the Chicago Daily Tribune reported on the news saying that Bacon "again fell foul" of "Fighting Bob" with his "sarcastic letter."

== Bacon's writing ==
Bacon edited Luther's Deutsche geistliche Lieder ("German Hymns") (New York, 1883), and wrote a number of historical and other books.

=== An Inside View of the Vatican Council ===
Bacon republished, with commentary, the speech of Peter Richard Kenrick, Archbishop of St. Louis, given in 1871 at the First Vatican Council; Kenrick spoke out against the dogma of papal infallibility. The booklet contains Kenrick's speech and other historical documents, as well as Bacon's own "acute and valuable remarks."

=== Church Papers ===
His Church Papers: Sundry Essays on Subjects Relating to the Church and Christian Society (1877), written while Bacon was in Geneva, was praised in the New Englander and Yale Review as a "juicy little volume"; the reviewer hailed the merit and attractiveness of the essays, which are "the product of sound reflection, and of a familiarity not only with books, but with men and things." He discusses such matters as the drawbacks of Congregationalism, which may allow for fallacious decisions by a random majority, and the Temperance movement, and the principles and methods of its zealous advocates.

== Bibliography ==
- An Inside View of the Vatican Council, in the Speech of the Most Reverend Archbishop Kenrick, of St. Louis. American Tract Society. 1872.
- Church Papers: Sundry Essays on Subjects Relating to the Church and Christian Society. New York: Putnam. 1877.
- Memorials of Emily Bliss Gould, of Rome: A Life Worth Living. New York: Anson D.F. Randolph. 1878.
- Irenics and Polemics, with Sundry Essays in Church History (1898)
- A History of American Christianity (1898)
- Young People's Societies (with C. A. Northrup, 1900)
- The Congregationalists (1904)
