= Don't cross the bridge until you come to it =

English language proverb

Don't cross the bridge until you come to it is an English language proverb that advises against worrying prematurely about potential problems or obstacles that have not yet arisen. The phrase encourages the listener to wait until a hypothetical challenge actually arises before spending time and energy on it.

While the origin of the phrase is unclear, its first known use is considered to be an 1850 journal entry by the poet Henry Wadsworth Longfellow in which he wrote, "Remember the proverb, 'Do not cross the bridge till you come to it.'" Longfellow later repeated it in his 1851 work "The Golden Legend" and called it an "old" proverb: "Don't cross the bridge till you come to it, is a proverb old and of excellent wit." Previously, the line appeared in The Independent newspaper of New York City in January 1849.

It has been quoted regularly in speech and writing, with an early appearance in 1866 American book "Bill Arp, So Called" (with before in place of till). It is quoted in Erle Stanley Gardner's 1941 story "The Case of the Empty Tin" and in the 1967 play Rosencraniz and Guildenstern Are Dead by Tom Stoppard.
