= Leonard Bacon =

American Congregational preacher and writer (1802–1881)

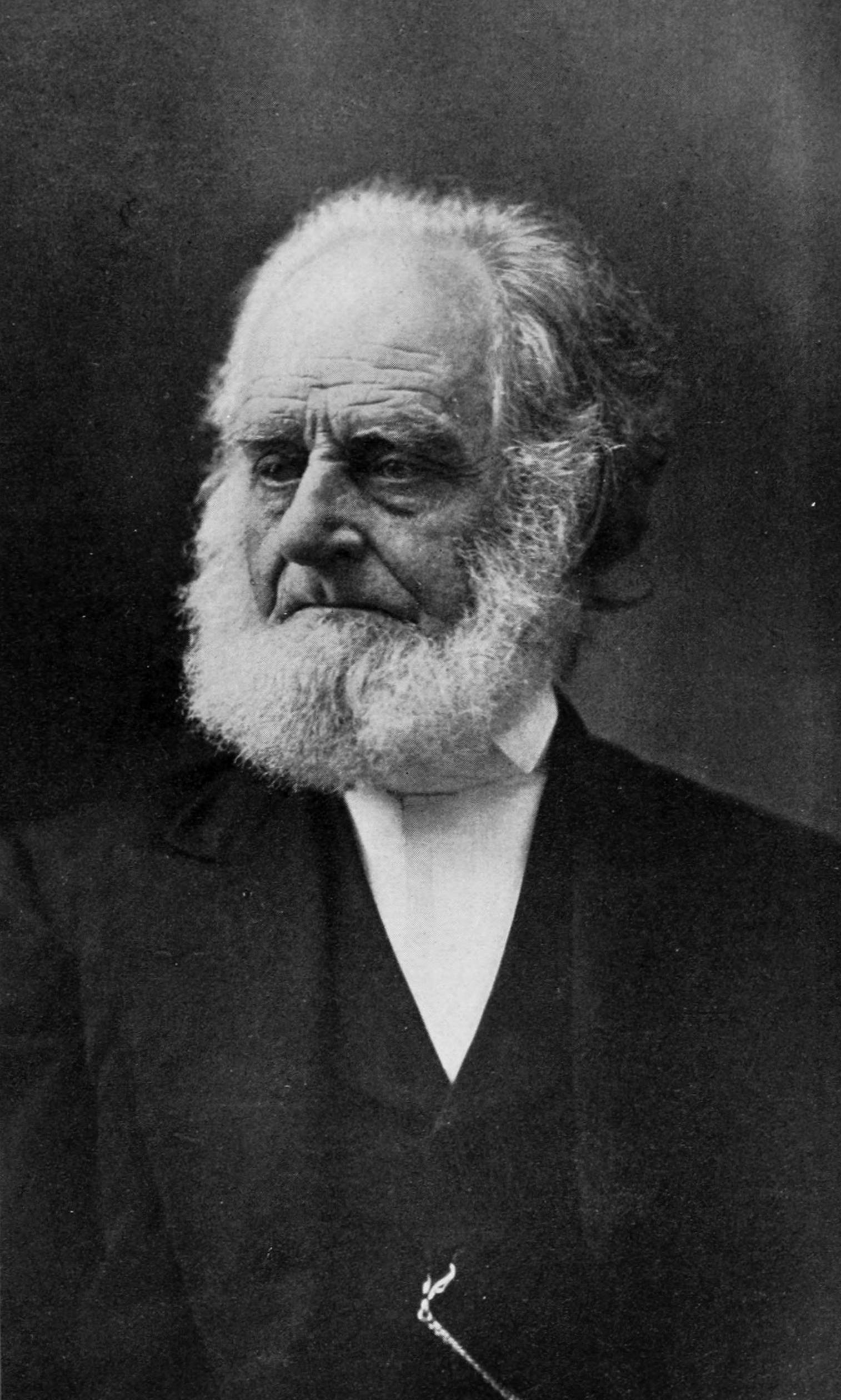
- Born: February 19, 1802; Detroit, Michigan
- Died: December 24, 1881 (aged 79); New Haven, Connecticut
- Resting place: Grove Street Cemetery
- Education: Yale College; Andover Theological Seminary
- Occupations: Clergyman, Professor
- Children: Leonard Woolsey Bacon; Edward Woolsey Bacon; George B. Bacon; Thomas Rutherford Bacon; Francis Bacon

Reverend Leonard Bacon (February 19, 1802 – December 24, 1881) was an American Congregational preacher and writer. He held the pulpit of the First Church New Haven and was later professor of church history and polity at Yale College.

== Biography ==
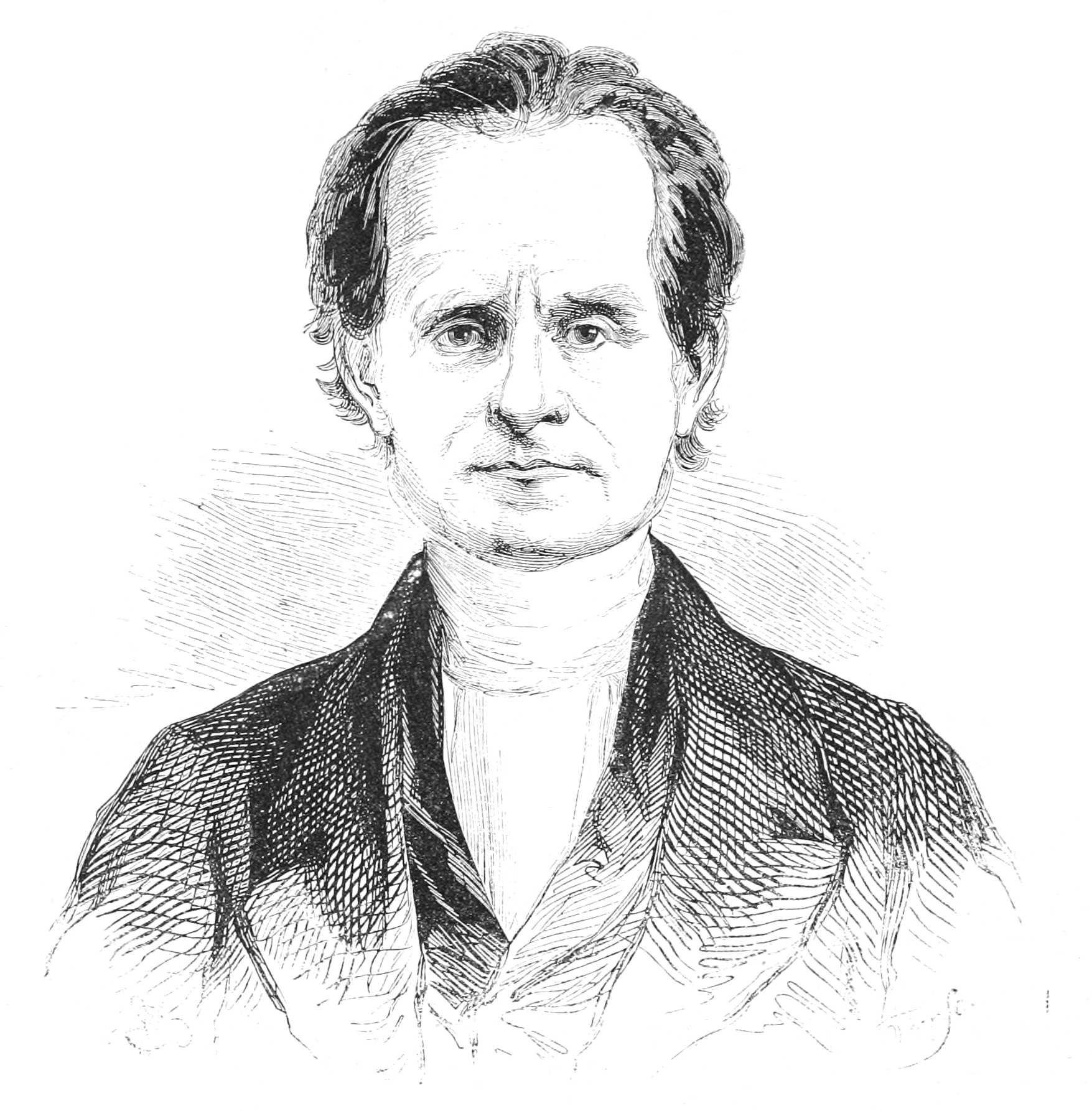
Leonard Bacon, D. D.

Leonard Bacon was born in Detroit, Michigan. He was the son of David Bacon (1771–1817), a missionary among the Indians in Michigan and founder of the town of Tallmadge, Ohio. There his sister Delia Bacon, later a major Shakespeare scholar, was born in 1811.

Leonard Bacon prepared for college at grammar school in Hartford, Connecticut. He graduated from Yale College in 1820, where he was a member of Brothers in Unity, and from the Andover Theological Seminary in 1823. From 1825 until his death he was pastor of the First Church (Congregational) in New Haven, Connecticut, occupying a pulpit which was one of the most conspicuous in New England, and which had been rendered famous by his predecessors, Moses Stuart and Nathaniel W. Taylor. In 1866, however, though never dismissed by a council from his connection with that church, he gave up the active pastorate; still, in 1868 he was president of the American Congregational Union.

From 1826 to 1838, he was an editor of the Christian Spectator (New Haven). In 1843 he was one of the founders of the New Englander (later the Yale Review), and in 1848, with Richard Salter Storrs, Joshua Leavitt, Joseph Parrish Thompson, and Henry C. Bowen, he founded The Independent, a magazine designed primarily to combat slavery extension; he was an editor of the Independent until 1863. From 1866 until his death he taught at Yale: first, until 1871, as acting professor of didactic theology in the Theological Department; and from 1871 as lecturer on church polity and American church history. He traveled to the Middle East (then "Greater Syria") in the middle 1800s to visit holy sites, and gave lectures on his experiences, at least one of which was published in the New York Times.

As a part of the 1872 Iwakura Mission Bacon was given guardianship of Yamakawa Sutematsu, a Japanese girl sent to the United States to be educated. She became particularly close with the youngest daughter in the household, Alice Mabel Bacon, and would become the first Japanese woman to receive a college degree.

Bacon was buried at Grove Street Cemetery, as was his sister Delia Bacon. Four of his six sons became Congregational pastors: Edward Woolsey Bacon (in New London, Connecticut), Leonard Woolsey Bacon, George B. Bacon (in Orange, New Jersey), and Thomas Rutherford Bacon (in New Haven, Connecticut).

== Convictions and influence ==
In his own theological views, Bacon was broad-minded and an advocate of liberal orthodoxy. In all matters concerning the welfare of his community or the nation, moreover, he took a deep and constant interest, and was particularly identified with the temperance and anti-slavery movements, his services to the latter constituting perhaps the most important work of his life. In this, as in most other controversies, he took a moderate course, condemning the apologists and defenders of slavery on the one hand and the Garrisonian extremists on the other. His Slavery Discussed in Occasional Essays from 1833 to 1846 (1846) exercised considerable influence upon Abraham Lincoln, and in this book appears the sentence, which, as rephrased by Lincoln, was widely quoted: "If that form of government, that system of social order is not wrong — if those laws of the Southern States, by virtue of which slavery exists there, and is what it is, are not wrong — nothing is wrong."

He was early attracted to the study of the ecclesiastical history of New England and was frequently called upon to deliver commemorative addresses, some of which were published in book and pamphlet form. Of these, his Thirteen Historical Discourses (1839), dealing with the history of New Haven, and his Four Commemorative Discourses (1866) may be especially mentioned. The most important of his historical works, however, is his Genesis of the New England Churches (1874). He published A Manual for Young Church Members (1833); edited, with a biography, the Select Practical Writings of Richard Baxter (1831); and was the author of a number of hymns, the best-known of which is the one beginning, "O God, beneath Thy guiding hand Our exiled fathers crossed the sea."

Gradually, after taking up his pastorate, he gained greater and greater influence in his denomination, until he came to be regarded as perhaps the most prominent Congregationalist of his time, and was sometimes popularly referred to as "The Congregational Pope of New England." In all the heated theological controversies of the day, particularly the long and bitter one concerning the views put forward by Dr Horace Bushnell, he was conspicuous, using his influence to bring about harmony, and in the councils of the Congregational churches, over two of which, the Brooklyn councils of 1874 and 1876. he presided as moderator, he manifested great ability both as a debater and as a parliamentarian.

His congregation published a commemorative volume in his honor, Leonard Bacon, Pastor of the First Church in New Haven (New Haven, 1882), and his biography is also found in Williston Walker's Ten New England Leaders (New York, 1901).
