= Charles Jefferson =

Charles Jefferson may refer to:

- Charles E. Jefferson (1945–2025), American politician in Illinois
- Charles Edward Jefferson, American Congregational clergyman
- Charles Jefferson (American football) (born 1957), American football player
