= Edward Woolsey Bacon =

- Born: May 5, 1843; New Haven, Connecticut, U.S.
- Died: June 7, 1887 (aged 44); Santa Clara County, California, U.S.
- Education: Yale Divinity School
- Occupations: Clergyman; sailor; soldier
- Father: Leonard Bacon
- Relatives: George B. Bacon (brother); Leonard Woolsey Bacon (brother); Thomas Rutherford Bacon (brother)

Edward Woolsey Bacon (May 5, 1843 – June 7, 1887) was an American Congregational clergyman, as well as a sailor and a soldier.

== Biography ==
Bacon was born in New Haven, Connecticut. He came from a family of preachers: he was the son of Leonard Bacon and the brother of Leonard Woolsey Bacon, Thomas Rutherford Bacon of New Haven, and George B. Bacon, all Congregational preachers.

In 1861, eighteen-year-old Bacon left home and served in the United States Navy in the Caribbean and on the Mississippi River during the American Civil War. He contracted dengue fever and suffered from defective vision; still, after his stint in the Navy he signed up as an infantry officer and led the 29th Connecticut Volunteer Infantry (Colored)—possibly influenced by his father, a staunch abolitionist. His attitudes toward African Americans was described as "patronizing ... at best," a common view among white officers in charge of colored regiments. He saw severe action in Petersburg, Virginia, and led his troops into Richmond on April 3, 1865. He was part of the occupying force of Texas, and in June 1865 was promoted to major of the 117th Colored Infantry Regiment, after which he resigned.

On his return to civil life, Bacon studied theology at Yale Divinity School and preached in a few different places before settling in 1877 at the Second Congregational Church in New London, Connecticut. In 1880, he was a pastor at First Church in New London. He was active in the American Missionary Association, serving on the education committee in 1883; he also served on the board of the American Board of Commissioners for Foreign Missions and was appointed Assisted Recording Secretary.

In 1885, while on a vacation for his health in California, he abruptly resigned his ministry in Connecticut, to the surprise of his congregation in New London; The New York Times reported his sudden appearance in Santa Barbara, where a sermon of his in the Congregational church was received with approbation and judged to inspire "new ideas, fresh thoughts, and high resolve."

Health problems caused by tuberculosis continued to plague him. After his return from Santa Barbara he again resumed the ministry but was forced to resign; he took up a position in Berkeley, California and died in Santa Clara County, California. A service was held in New Haven.
