= Edwards Amasa Park =

American theologian (1808–1900)

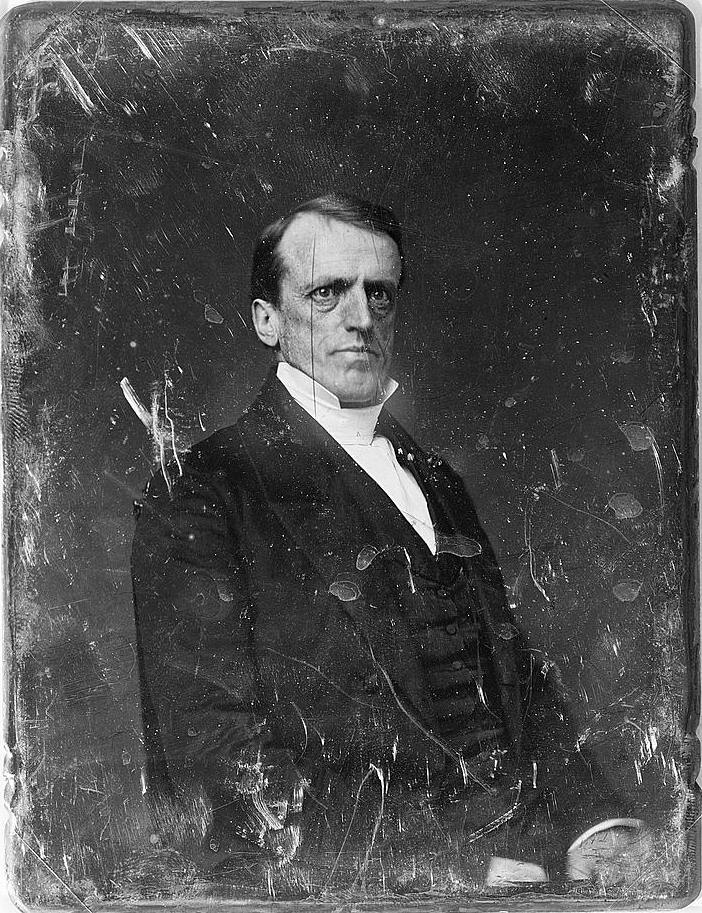
Edwards Amasa Park

Edwards Amasa Park (December 29, 1808 – June 4, 1900) was an American Congregational theologian.

== Biography ==
Born in Providence, Rhode Island, Park was the son of Calvin Park (1774-1847) (a Congregational minister who was a professor from 1804 to 1825 at Brown University, and pastor at Stoughton, Massachusetts from 1826 to 1840). Edwards Amasa Park graduated at Brown University in 1826, was a teacher at Braintree for two years, and in 1831 graduated from Andover Theological Seminary. He was co-pastor (with R. S. Storrs) of the orthodox Congregational church of Braintree in 1831-1833; professor of mental and moral philosophy at Amherst in 1835; and Bartlet professor of sacred rhetoric (1836-1847), and Abbot professor of Christian theology (1847-1881) at Andover. He died at Andover on 4 June 1900.

An ardent admirer of Jonathan Edwards, whose great-granddaughter he married, Park was one of the most notable American theologians and orators. He was the most prominent leader of the new school of New England Theology. He left his theological impress on the Bibliotheca Sacra, which he and Bela B. Edwards took over in 1844 from Edward Robinson, who had founded it in 1843, and of which Park was assistant editor until 1851 and editor-in-chief from 1851 to 1884.

== Publications ==
As a general statement of the position of orthodox Congregationalism he drew up and annotated the Associate Creed of Andover Theological Seminary (1883), and the anonymously published Worcester Creed of 1884 was his popularized and simplified statement. He edited in 1890 The Atonement, a collection of essays by various hands, prefaced by his study of the Rise of the Edwardean Theory of the Atonement.

Park's sermon, The Theology of the Intellect and that of the Feelings, delivered in 1850 before the convention of the Congregational ministers of Massachusetts, and published in the Bibliotheca Sacra of July 1850, was the cause of a long and bitter controversy, metaphysical rather than doctrinal, with Charles Hodge. Some of Park's sermons were published in 1885, under the title Discourses on Some Theological Doctrines as Related to the Religious Character. With Austin Phelps and Lowell Mason he prepared The Sabbath Hymn Book (1858).

He published memoirs of Samuel Hopkins, Nathanael Emmons, and others. See Professor Park and His Pupils (Boston, 1899), a memorial of his 90th birthday, with articles by R.S. Storrs, G.R.W. Scott, Joseph Cook, G. Frederick Wright, and others.
