= George B. Bacon =

American clergyman and author

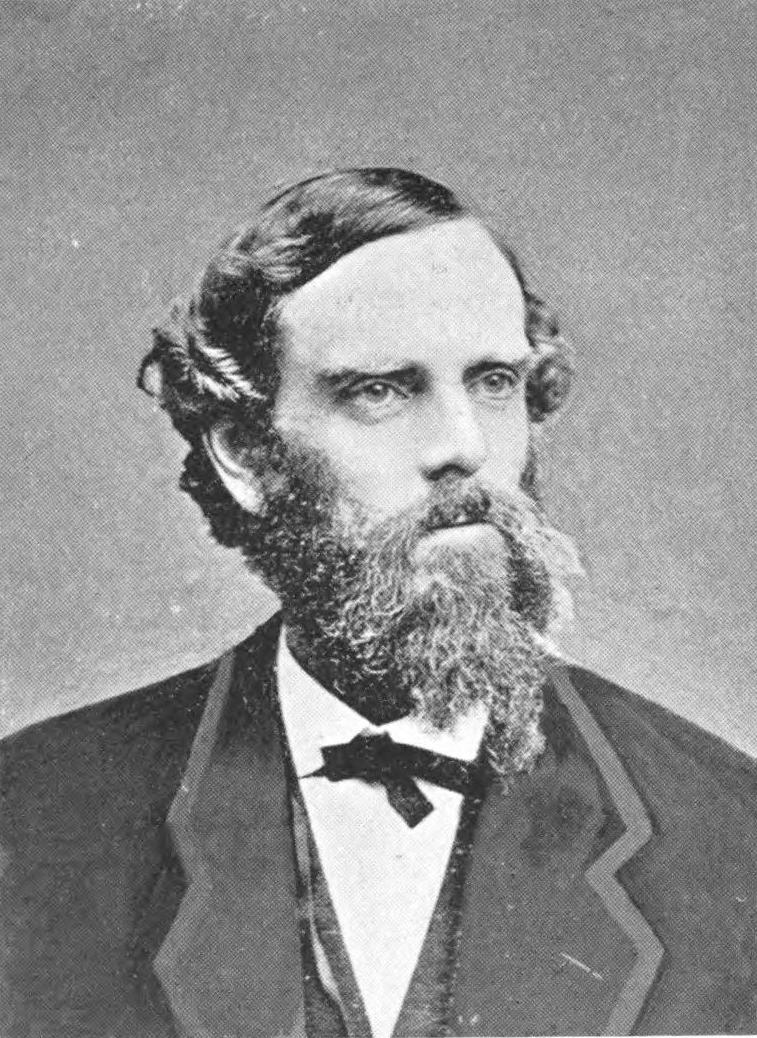
- Born: May 22, 1836
- Died: September 15, 1876
- Education: Yale University
- Relatives: Francis Bacon

George Blagden Bacon (May 22, 1836, in New Haven, Connecticut – September 15, 1876) was an American clergyman and author of texts on religious issues. Bacon was a congregational pastor in Orange, New Jersey. The ministry ran in the Bacons' blood: George B. Bacon was the son of Leonard Bacon and the brother of Leonard Woolsey Bacon, both Congregationalist pastors; two other brothers were also preachers, Thomas Rutherford Bacon of New Haven, and Edward Woolsey Bacon of New London, Connecticut.

== Career and work ==
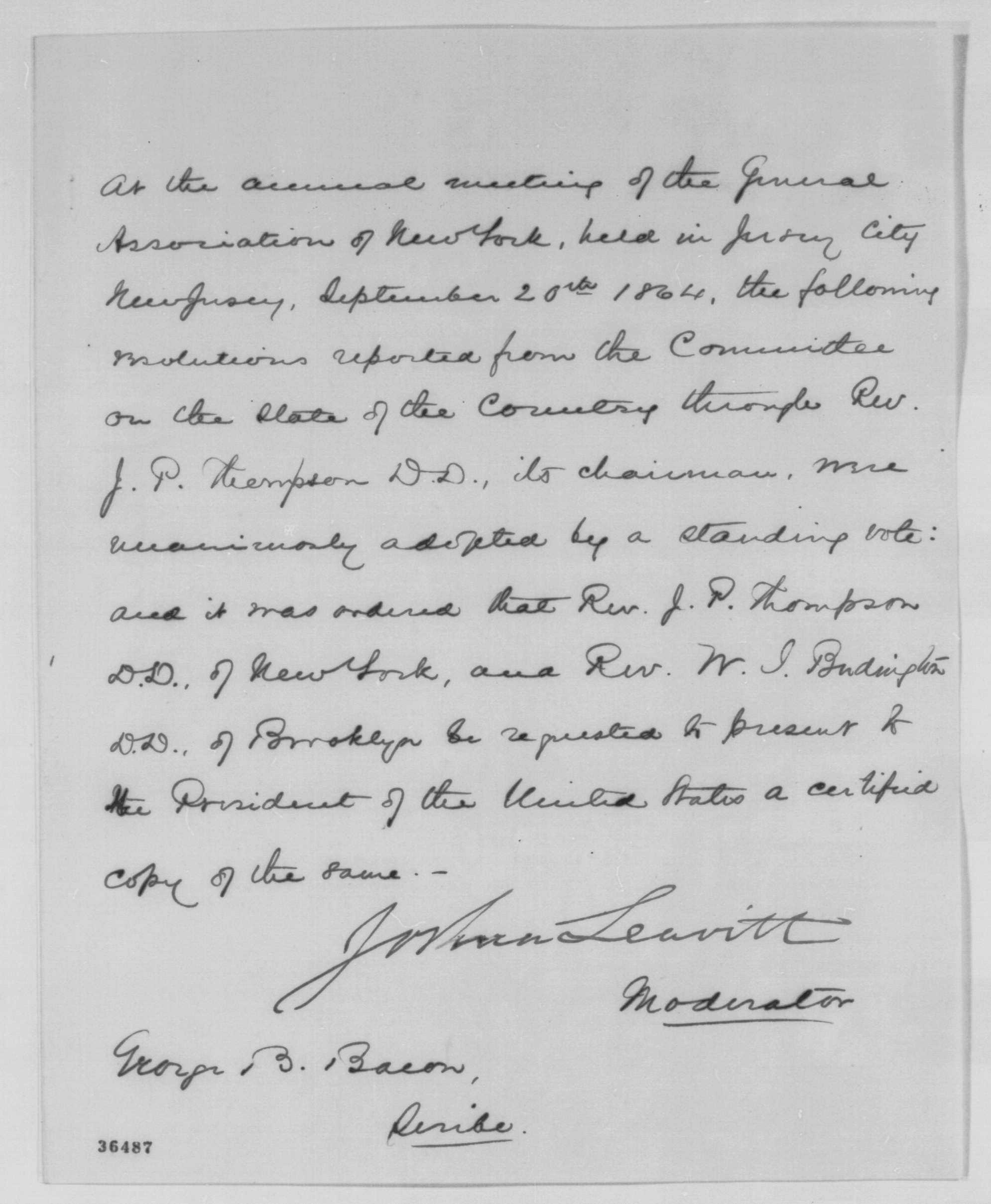
Letter from abolitionist Joshua Leavitt and Bacon to Abraham Lincoln, forwarding resolutions of General Association of New York, 1864

Bacon graduated from Yale University in 1856. He became minister of the Congregational Church in Orange, New Jersey, in 1861, and became a trustee of the American Congregational Union in 1866. In 1875, he was again nominated as trustee of the board of regents of the Congregational Union, but publicly stated that he declined to serve on the board with Henry C. Bowen; Bacon's father, Rev. Leonard Woolsey Bacon, felt misrepresented enough by remarks made by Bowen that he wrote a letter to the Chicago Tribune publicly disavowing any friendship with Bowen. In the same year, George Bacon delivered the commencement address at the New York Medical College and Hospital for Women.

Bacon, whom The Nation called a "lively" writer, was a regular contributor to Scribner’s Monthly, writing on religious as well as social topics (such as Chinese immigration to the United States). He also wrote on the Sabbath question, an important subject in late-nineteenth century America when a debate was waged between those who saw the day of rest as a legal obligation and those, including Bacon, who considered it a Christian privilege. He died at age 40, on 15 September 1876, after a "lingering illness". In a eulogy, Scribner’s Monthly called him a "model literary clergyman": "His contributions to the body of the magazine were always marked by broad views, intense dislike of sham and cant, by high moral purpose, and by a style as simple and direct as it was elegant and attractive."

== Bibliography ==
- The Sabbath Question: Sermons Preached to the Valley Church, Orange, N.J. New York: Charles Scribner. 1868.
- The Sabbath Question: Sunday Observance and Sunday Laws. A Sermon and Two Speeches by Leonard W. Bacon. Six Sermons on the Sabbath Question by the late George B. Bacon. 1882.
