= Bela Bates Edwards =

American theologian

Bela Bates Edwards (1802–1852) was an American man of letters.

== Biography ==
Edwards was born at Southampton, Massachusetts, on 4 July 1802. He graduated at Amherst College in 1824, was a tutor there from 1827 to 1828, graduated at Andover Theological Seminary in 1830, and was licensed to preach.

From 1828 to 1833 he was assistant Secretary of the American Education Society (organized in Boston in 1815 to assist students for the ministry), and from 1828 to 1842 was editor of the society's newsletter, which after 1831 was called the American Quarterly Register.

He also founded (in 1833) and edited the American Quarterly Observer; from 1836 to 1841 edited the Biblical Repository (after 1837 called the American Biblical Repository) with which the Observer was merged in 1835; and was editor-in-chief of Bibliotheca Sacra from 1844 to 1852. In 1837 he became professor of Hebrew at Andover Theological Seminary, and from 1848 until his death was associate professor of sacred literature there. He was a founder of the Society for Ameliorating the Condition of the Slave and of the American Missionary Society. He died at Athens, Georgia, on 20 April 1852.

== Publications ==
Among his numerous publications were:

- The Missionary Gazetteer (1832);
- The Biography of Self-Taught Men, with an Introductory Essay (1832);
- Memoir of Reverend Elias Cornelius (1833);
- a once widely known Eclectic Reader (1830s);
- a translation, with Samuel Harvey Taylor (1807–1871), of Kuhner's Schulgrammatik der Griechischen Sprache
- Classical Studies (1844), essays in ancient literature and art written in collaboration with Barnas Sears and C. C. Felton.
- Addresses and Sermons, with a memoir by Rev. Edwards A. Park (1808–1900), were published in two volumes at Boston in 1853.
