= Thomas Rutherford Bacon =

American theologian

- Born: Thomas Rutherford Bacon; June 26, 1850; New Haven, Connecticut, United States
- Died: March 26, 1913 (aged 62); Berkeley, California, United States
- Resting place: Mountain View Cemetery, Oakland, Alameda County California, United States
- Education: Yale University
- Occupations: Minister, Professor
- Employer: Congregationalist Church; University of California (1888-1913)
- Known for: Mugwump; United States presidential election of 1884
- Political party: Democrat
- Parent: Leonard Bacon
- Relatives: Leonard Woolsey Bacon; Edward Woolsey Bacon; George B. Bacon

Thomas Rutherford Bacon (June 26, 1850 in New Haven, Connecticut – March 26, 1913 in Berkeley, California) was an American Congregational clergyman and leading Mugwump. In the wake of the presidential election of 1884, he relocated to the West Coast, where he became a professor of history at the University of California.

== Biography ==
=== Early Background ===
Thomas Rutherford Bacon came from a family of preachers: he was the son of Leonard Bacon and the brother of Leonard Woolsey Bacon, Edward Woolsey Bacon (of New London, Connecticut), and George B. Bacon, all Congregational preachers.

Bacon graduated from Yale Divinity School in 1877. At Yale, he was the editor of the Yale Banner and contributed to The Yale Record. At the time, The Yale Record was edited by Walker Blaine, son of Republican James G. Blaine.

=== "Original Mugwump" and the Election of 1884 ===
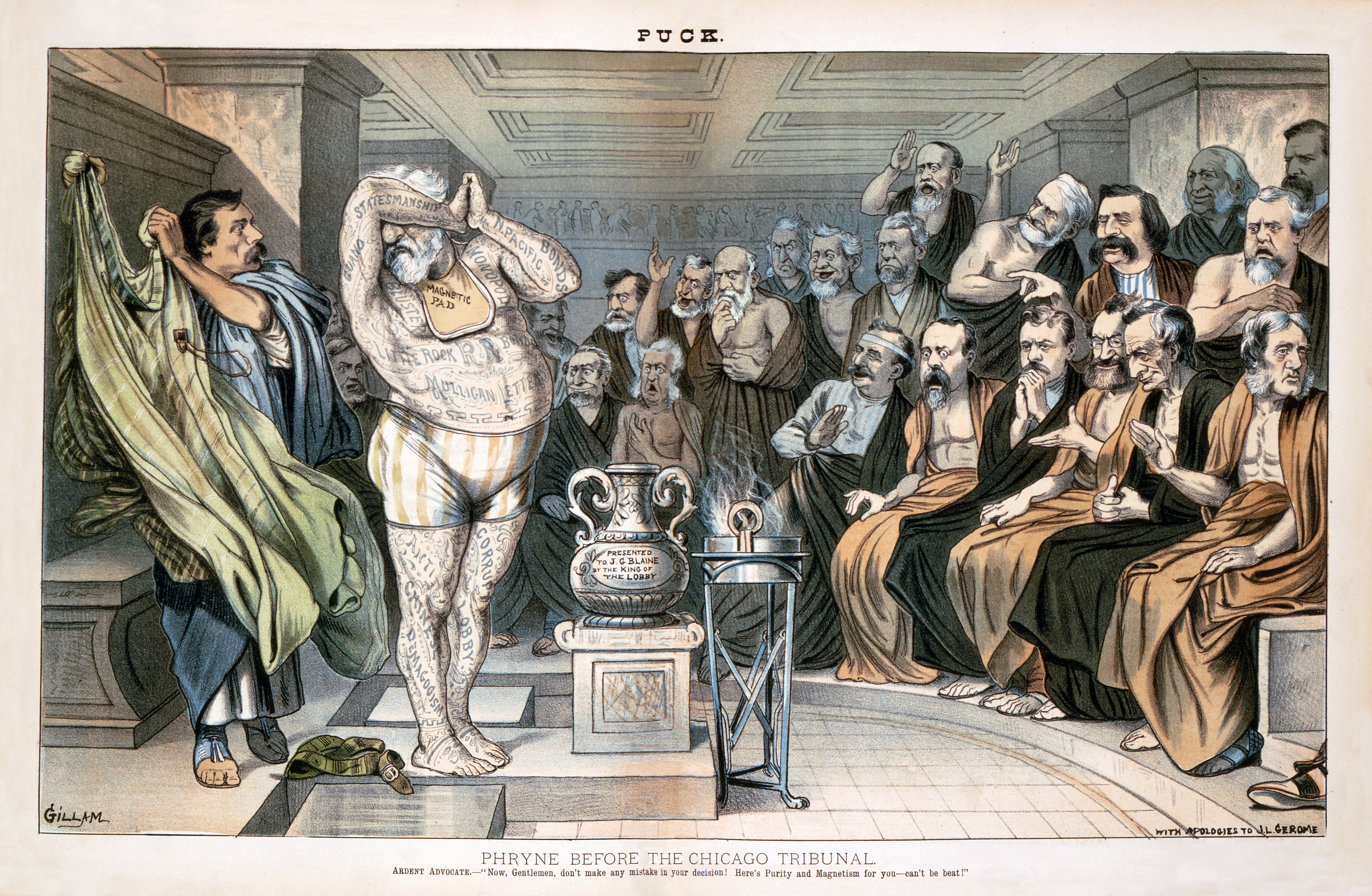
Mugwump cartoon mocking Republican presidential candidate James G. Blaine in an 1884 issue of Puck

He was a minister for three years at the Dwight Place Church in New Haven, Connecticut. On July 4, 1884, he delivered an oration on the occasion of the hundredth anniversary of the town.

The New York Times praised Bacon for his integrity and "manliness," and called him "the original mugwump of Connecticut." The "Mugwumps" were Republican political activists who left the United States Republican Party to support Democratic candidate Grover Cleveland in the United States presidential election of 1884. During the Third Party System, party loyalty was held in high regard and independents were rare.

In 1884, he resigned unexpectedly, after some gossiping members of his congregations ("without standing or influence") had apparently complained about him. The New York Times later reported that Blaine's campaign was behind the gossip. The congregation was, according to the papers, moved to tears when Bacon, who was described as "young, talented, eloquent, and popular," read his resignation letter. There were hints of an investigation, and the possible "disciplining [of] certain folks whose too freely wagging tongues have brought about the trouble."

=== After Blaine's Defeat ===
After his church career in New Haven was ended, he devoted himself to literary pursuits, publishing in the New Englander and serving as that magazine's associate editor from 1886 to 1887; he also edited the New Haven Morning News, from 1884 to 1887.

In June 1887, his brother Edward died in Santa Clara County, California, and in that same year (until 1890) Thomas took up the ministry of the First Congregational Church in Berkeley, where Edward had also, briefly, been a minister. In 1888, he became an instructor in the history department at the University of California, and from 1890 to 1895 was a professor in European history. In 1895, he was promoted to full professor in Modern European History, a position he held—in worsening health—until his death in 1913.
