= Benjamin Wisner Bacon =

American theologian and academic (1860–1932)

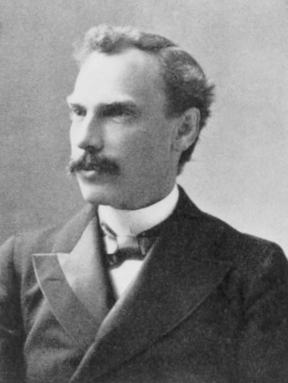
- Born: January 15, 1860; Litchfield, Connecticut, US
- Died: February 1, 1932 (aged 72); New Haven, Connecticut, US
- Burial place: Grove Street Cemetery
- Education: Yale College; Yale Divinity School
- Occupation: Theologian

Benjamin Wisner Bacon (January 15, 1860 – February 1, 1932) was an American theologian and academic. He first served as a pastor in Connecticut and New York before serving as the Buckingham Professor of New Testament Criticism and Interpretation at Yale University for 31 years. His works primarily contributed to the fields of biblical interpretation and literature.

== Biography ==
Benjamin Wisner Bacon was born in Litchfield, Connecticut on January 15, 1860, the son of Leonard Woolsey Bacon. Originally attending the Hopkins School, he later attended a gymnasium in Cologne and the Collège de Genève. He graduated from Yale College in 1881 and Yale Divinity School in 1884, serving as a fullback for 4 seasons on Yale's football team. Ordained in 1884, he served as a pastor at Old Lyme, Connecticut between 1884 and 1889, and at Oswego, New York from 1889 to 1896. He was made an instructor in New Testament Greek at Yale Divinity School at the end of the latter pastorate; he was made Buckingham Professor of New Testament Criticism and Interpretation in 1897 and served in the role until his retirement in 1928. He also served as acting pastor of the United Church of Christ chapel at Yale.

Bacon served as president of the Society of Biblical Literature in 1902 and 1903, and also served as resident director of the American Society of Overseas Research for 1905-06. He also received various honorary degrees (including Doctor of Divinity, Doctor of Letters and Doctor of Laws). He died at his home in New Haven, Connecticut on February 1, 1932. He was buried at Grove Street Cemetery.

== Works ==
Bacon's work primarily surrounded biblical literature and interpretation, and also contributed greatly to literature on biblical criticism and exegesis. Besides contributions to the Hibbert Journal and to the American Journal of Theology (of both of which he was chosen as an editor), his writings include:

- The Genesis of Genesis (1891)
- Triple Tradition of the Exodus (1894)
- The Sermon on the Mount (1902)
- The Story of St. Paul (1904)
- An Introduction to the New Testament (1907)
- The Founding of the Church (1909)
- The Fourth Gospel in Research and Debate (1909)
- Jesus the Son of God (1911)
- The Making of the New Testament (1912)
- Theodore Thornton Munger (1914)
- Is Mark a Roman Gospel? (1919)
- The Gospel of Mark: Its composition and date (1925)
