= The Independent (New York City) =

American weekly magazine

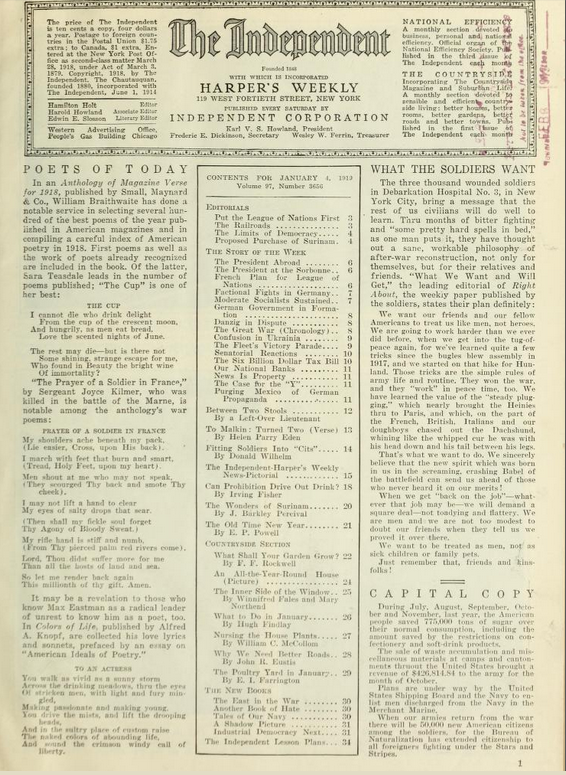
- Table of contents and masthead from the January 4, 1919 edition of The Independent
- Frequency: Weekly, except fortnightly from May 27, 1922 to September 13, 1924
- Circulation: 75,000 (1870)
- First issue: December 7, 1848
- Final issue: October 13, 1928
- Country: United States
- Based in: New York City; Boston (from 1924)
- OCLC: 4927591

The Independent was a weekly magazine published in New York City between 1848 and 1928. It was founded in order to promote Congregationalism and was also an important voice in support of abolitionism and women's suffrage. In 1924 it moved to Boston, Massachusetts.

== Publication history ==
=== Beginnings ===
From its founding in 1848 until 1861 The Independent was edited by a team of three prominent Congregational ministers: Joseph Parrish Thompson, Richard Salter Storrs, and Leonard Bacon. It was published and financed by a group of New York businessmen led by Henry C. Bowen of the silk wholesaling firm Bowen & McNamee. The editorial policy was strongly antislavery, which hurt the magazine's circulation initially, but it improved through the 1850s to reach 35,000 by the beginning of the American Civil War.

In 1861 Harriet Beecher Stowe's brother Henry Ward Beecher, who had been a regular contributor to the magazine, became its editor. His assistant editor was Theodore Tilton, who succeeded Beecher as editor in 1863 and remained in the position until 1870. During Tilton's tenure, The Independent took up the cause of women's suffrage. It also published poetry and literary contributions by authors including Elizabeth Barrett Browning, Harriet Beecher Stowe, Emma Lazarus, John Greenleaf Whittier, James Russell Lowell and Edward Eggleston, who was also briefly supervising editor, in 1871. It reached its highest circulation of 75,000 in 1870, the year in which Tilton retired as editor.

=== Trends ===
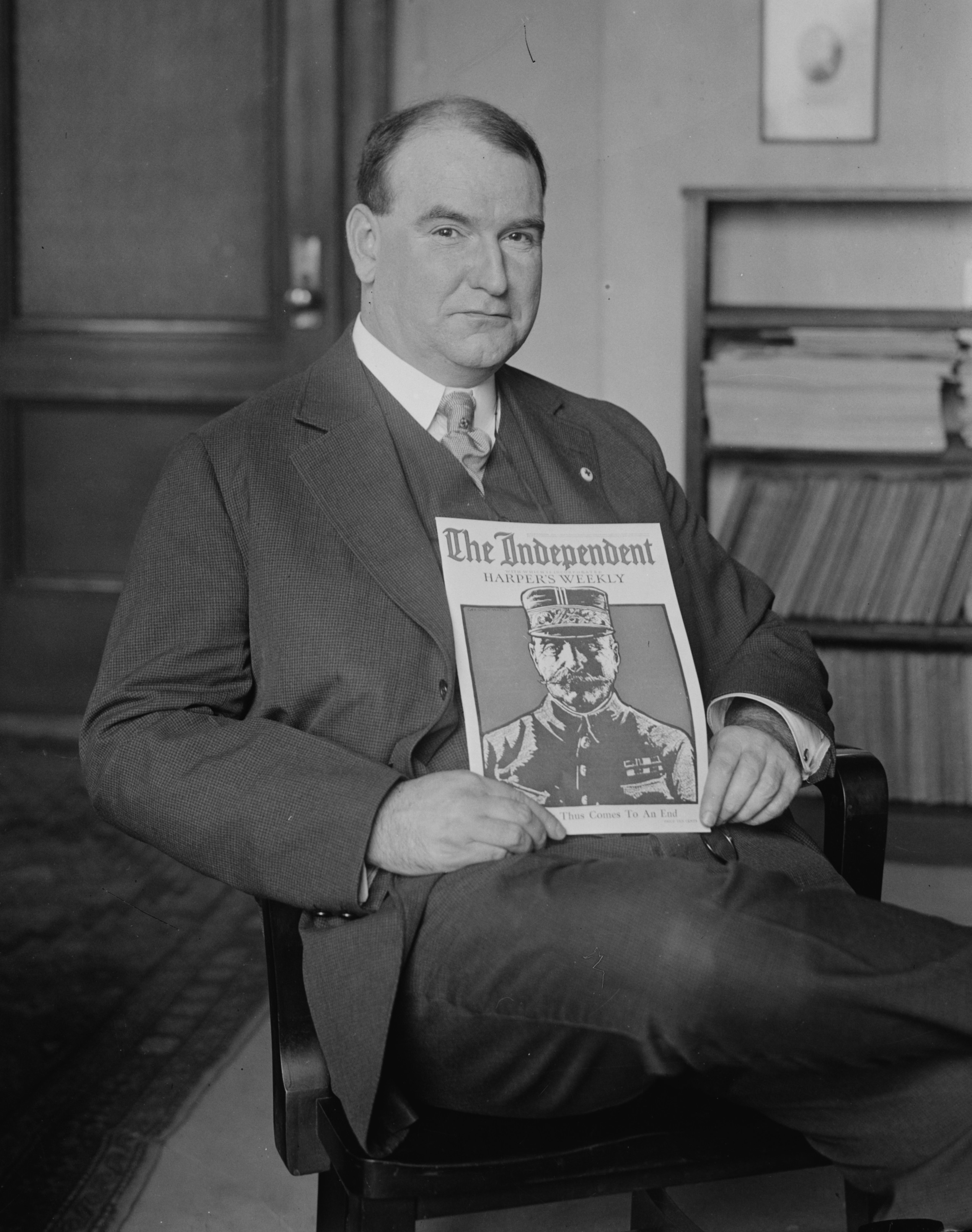
Primary editor of The Independent in the 20th Century, Hamilton Holt

Tilton was succeeded by Henry C. Bowen, who continued as both editor and publisher until his death in 1896, when William Hayes Ward became editor. Thereafter the magazine devoted less attention to religious affairs, and contained more political coverage and illustrations. This trend continued under the editorship of Hamilton Holt (Bowen's grandson), a strong proponent of the League to Enforce Peace and later the League of Nations. During the second decade of the twentieth century The Independent absorbed three other magazines: The Chautauquan (1914), Harper's Weekly (1916), and Countryside (1917).

A printers' strike in 1919 was damaging to the magazine, which struggled with rising costs and changed hands several times during the 1920s. In 1924 its last owners moved it to Boston but it remained unsuccessful. In 1928 The Independent was merged with The Outlook to form The Outlook and Independent.
