= Emily Bliss Gould =

Emily Bliss Gould (c. 1825 - 31 August 1875 Perugia, Italy) was founder of a school for Italian children of limited means.

== Biography ==
She was the wife of a physician to the United States legation in Italy. She founded the American schools in Rome, and assisted in establishing those of Florence. Her labors began after the inundation of the Tiber on 31 December 1870, which was the cause of much distress and poverty. On 20 March 1871, Gould opened a home and school for Italian children in a room lent by a Vaudois clergyman. She had no teacher, and only three little girls for scholars. Owing to generous contributions, at the time of her death there were twenty in the home and thirty in the kindergarten.

Her main purpose was to secure to these children means of obtaining a living for themselves. Among the trades, that of printing was proposed as adapted to this end, as the increasing number of books and newspapers in Italy would demand good printers. In the winter of 1871 it was suggested that a volume should be prepared by the authors living in Rome at that time, printed at the home, and sold for its benefit. Among the contributors were Matthew Arnold, Mary Cowden Clarke, William W. Story, William and Mary Howitt, Howard M. Ticknor, and George P. Marsh. The book was not completed until after her death when it was printed at the home under the title of a Wreath to the Memory of Mrs. Emily Bliss Gould.

She was eminent for her social qualities. Her residence in Rome was most hospitably opened as a place for the reunion for travelers from the United States.
