= Bibliotheca Sacra =

Theological journal

- Discipline: Theology, Old Testament, New Testament
- Language: English
- Edited by: Glenn R. Kreider

Publication details
- History: 1844–present
- Publisher: Dallas Theological Seminary (U.S.)
- Frequency: Quarterly

Standard abbreviations
- ISO 4: Bibl. Sacra

Indexing
- ISSN: 0006-1921

Links
- Journal homepage

Bibliotheca Sacra (colloquially referred to as "BibSac") is a theological journal published by Dallas Theological Seminary, first published in 1844 and the oldest theological journal in the United States. It was founded at Union Theological Seminary in 1843, and moved to Andover Theological Seminary (now Andover Newton Theological School) in 1844 after publishing three issues, to Oberlin College in 1884, and to Xenia Seminary in 1922. Dallas Theological Seminary (then the Evangelical Theological College) took over publication in 1934.

== Editors ==
Early edition of Bibliotheca Sacra

The founding editor of Bibliotheca Sacra was Edward Robinson, who handed it over to Bela Bates Edwards in 1844, who merged it with the Biblical Repository in 1851. Upon his death in 1852, it was taken over by Edwards Amasa Park, who pledged to "cherish a catholic spirit among the conflicting schools of evangelical divines." He held the editorship until 1884, when he transferred control of the journal to George Frederick Wright at Oberlin College in an effort to keep it safe from growing liberal sentiment at Andover. Wright edited Bibliotheca Sacra until 1921, when he was succeeded by Melvin G. Kyle. Kyle's successors as editor were John H. Webster (1930–1933), Rollin T. Chafer (1934–1940), Lewis Sperry Chafer (1940–1952), John F. Walvoord (1952–1985), Roy B. Zuck (1986–2013), Larry J. Waters (2013–2018), and Glenn R. Kreider (2018–present).

== External links, 1st series ==
- Volume 1, 1844
- Volume 2, 1845
- Volume 3. 1846
- Volume 4, 1847
- Volume 5. 1848
- Volume 6, 1849
- Volume 7 1850
- Volume 8, 1851
- Volume 9 1852
- Volume 10 1853
- Volume 11 1854
- Volume 12 1855
- Volume 13 1856
- volume 14 1857
- Volume 15 1858
- Volume 16, 1859
- Volume 17, 1860
- Volume 18, 1861
- Volume 19. 1862
- Volume 20, 1863

== External links, 2nd series ==
- Volume 1, 1851
- Volume 2
- Volume 3
- Volume 4
- Volume 5
- Volume 6
- Volume 7
- Volume 8
- Volume 9
- Volume 10
- Volume 11
- Volume 12
- Volume 13
- Volume 14
- Volume 15
- Volume 16
- Volume 17
- Volume 18
- Volume 19
- Volume 20
- Volume 21
- Volume 22
- Volume 23
- Volume 24
- Volume 25
- Volume 26
- Volume 27
- Volume 28
- Volume 29
- Volume 30
- Volume 31
- Volume 32
- Volume 33
- Volume 34
- Volume 35
- Volume 36
- Volume 37
- Volume 38
- Volume 39
- Volume 40
- Volume 41
- Volume 42
- Volume 43
- Volume 44
- Volume 45
- Volume 46
- Volume 47
- Volume 48
- Volume 49
- Volume 50
- Volume 51
- Volume 52
- Volume 53
- Volume 54
- Volume 55
- Volume 56
- Volume 57
- Volume 58
- Volume 59
- Volume 60
- Volume 61
- Volume 62
- Volume 63
- Volume 64
- Volume 65
- Volume 66
- Volume 67
- Volume 68
- Volume 69
- Volume 70
- Volume 71
- Volume 72
- Volume 73
- Volume 74
- Volume 75
- Volume 76
- Volume 77
- Volume 78
- Volume 79, 1922
- Volume 80
