= Charles Edward Jefferson =

American Congregational clergyman (1860–1937)

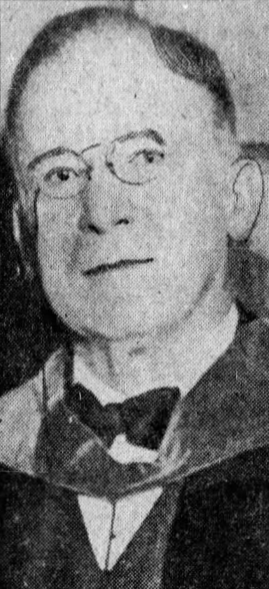
- Jefferson (c. 1927)
- Born: August 29, 1860; Cambridge, Ohio, U.S.
- Died: 1937 (aged 76–77)
- Education: Ohio Wesleyan University; Boston University
- Ordained: 1887

Charles Edward Jefferson (August 29, 1860 – 1937) was an American Congregational clergyman.

== Biography ==
Jefferson was born in Cambridge, Ohio, on August 29, 1860. He graduated from Ohio Wesleyan University in Delaware, Ohio, in 1882 and from the School of Theology of Boston University in 1887. He was ordained to the Congregational ministry in 1887. He was pastor of the Central Congregational Church at Chelsea, Massachusetts, until 1898, when he became pastor of the Broadway Tabernacle, New York. In 1914 he became chairman of the executive committee of the Church of Peace Union, endowed by Andrew Carnegie.

== Works ==
Among his writings are:

- Quiet Hints to Growing Preachers (1901)
- Quiet Talks with Earnest People in My Study(1901)
- The Broadway Tabernacle of the Past and Future (1901)
- Doctrine and Deed (1902)
- Things Fundamental (1903)
- The Minister as Prophet (1905)
- Faith and Life (1905)
- The New Crusade (1907)
- The Character of Jesus (1908)
- My Father's Business (1909)
- The Christmas Builders (1909)
- The Building of the Church (1910, 1913)
- Why We May Believe in Life after Death (1911)
- The Minister as Shepherd (1912)
- The Cause of the War (1914)
- Christianity and International Peace (1915)
- The Land of Enough (1917)
- Varieties of Pacifism. 1920. OL 22896131M.
