= Richard Salter Storrs =

American clergyman (1821–1900)

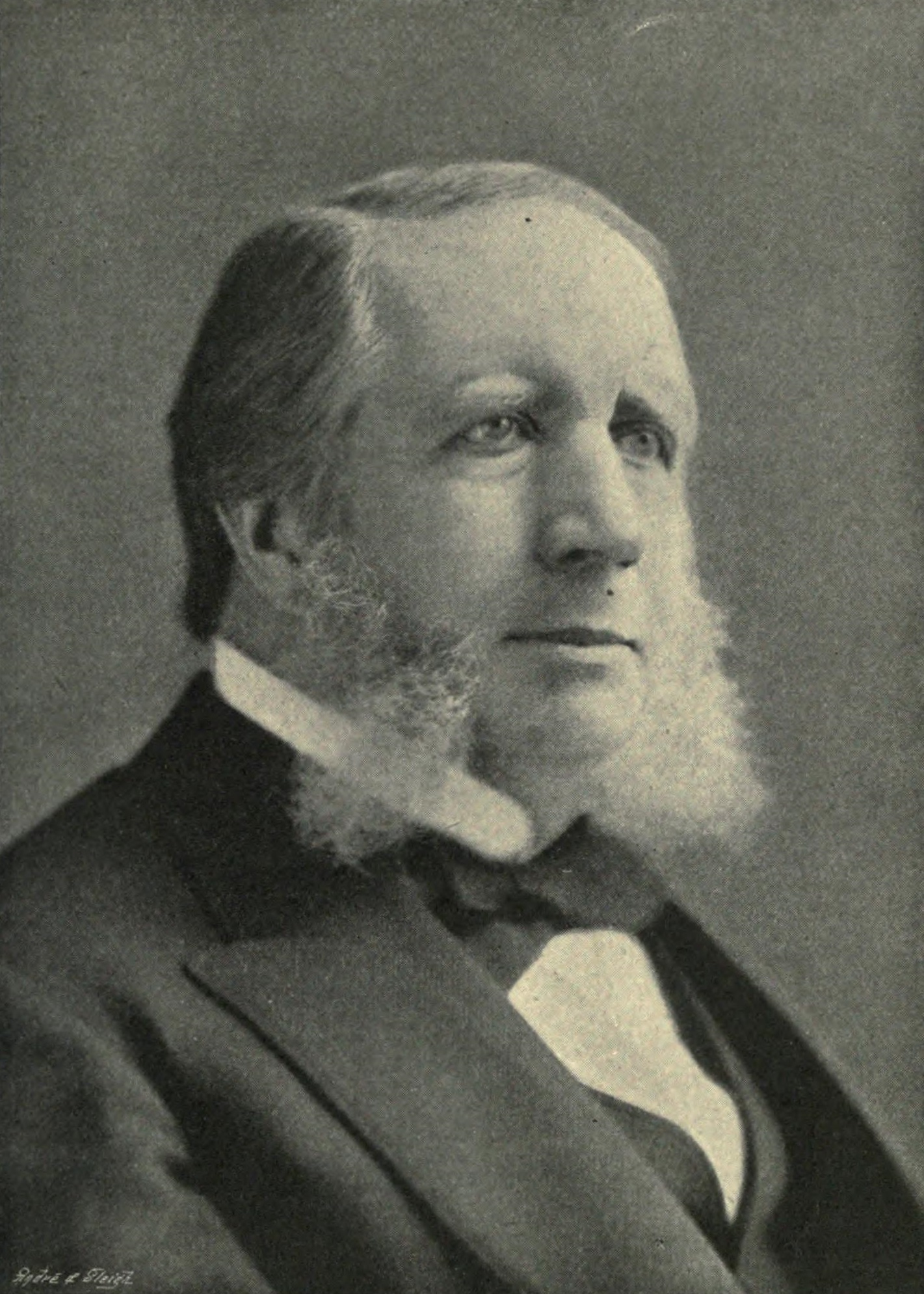
Richard Storrs, by Sherman & McHugh (Abraham Bogardus studio).

Richard Salter Storrs (August 21, 1821 – June 7, 1900) was an American Congregational clergyman.

== Biography ==
Storrs was born in Braintree, Massachusetts. He bore the same name as his grandfather (1763–1819), pastor at Longmeadow, Massachusetts, from 1785 to 1819, and his father (1787–1873), pastor at Braintree, Massachusetts, from 1811 to 1873 (except the years 1831–1836), both prominent Congregational ministers, who were descendants of Richard Mather.

He graduated at Amherst in 1839, studied law in Boston under Rufus Choate, graduated at Andover Theological Seminary in 1845, and was pastor of the Harvard Congregational church of Brookline, Massachusetts, in 1845–1846, and of the Church of the Pilgrims in Brooklyn, New York, from 1846 until shortly before his death.

He was a conservative in theology, and an historical writer of considerable ability. From 1848 to 1861, he was associate editor of the New York Independent, which he had helped to establish; from 1887 to 1897 he was president of the American board of commissioners for foreign missions, and he was prominent in the Long Island Historical Society.

His great-grandfather, John Storrs (1733–1799), a chaplain in the Continental Army, had been pastor of the Southold Church in 1763–1776 and in 1782–1787.

== Works ==
Dr Storrs's more important published works were:

- John Wycliffe and the First English Bible (1880)
- The Recognition of the Supernatural in Letters and in life (1881)
- Bernard of Clairvaux (1892)
- Foundation Truths of American Missions (1897).

== Bibliography ==
- Storrs, Charles (1886). The Storrs Family. New York: Privately printed. OCLC 5063370.
