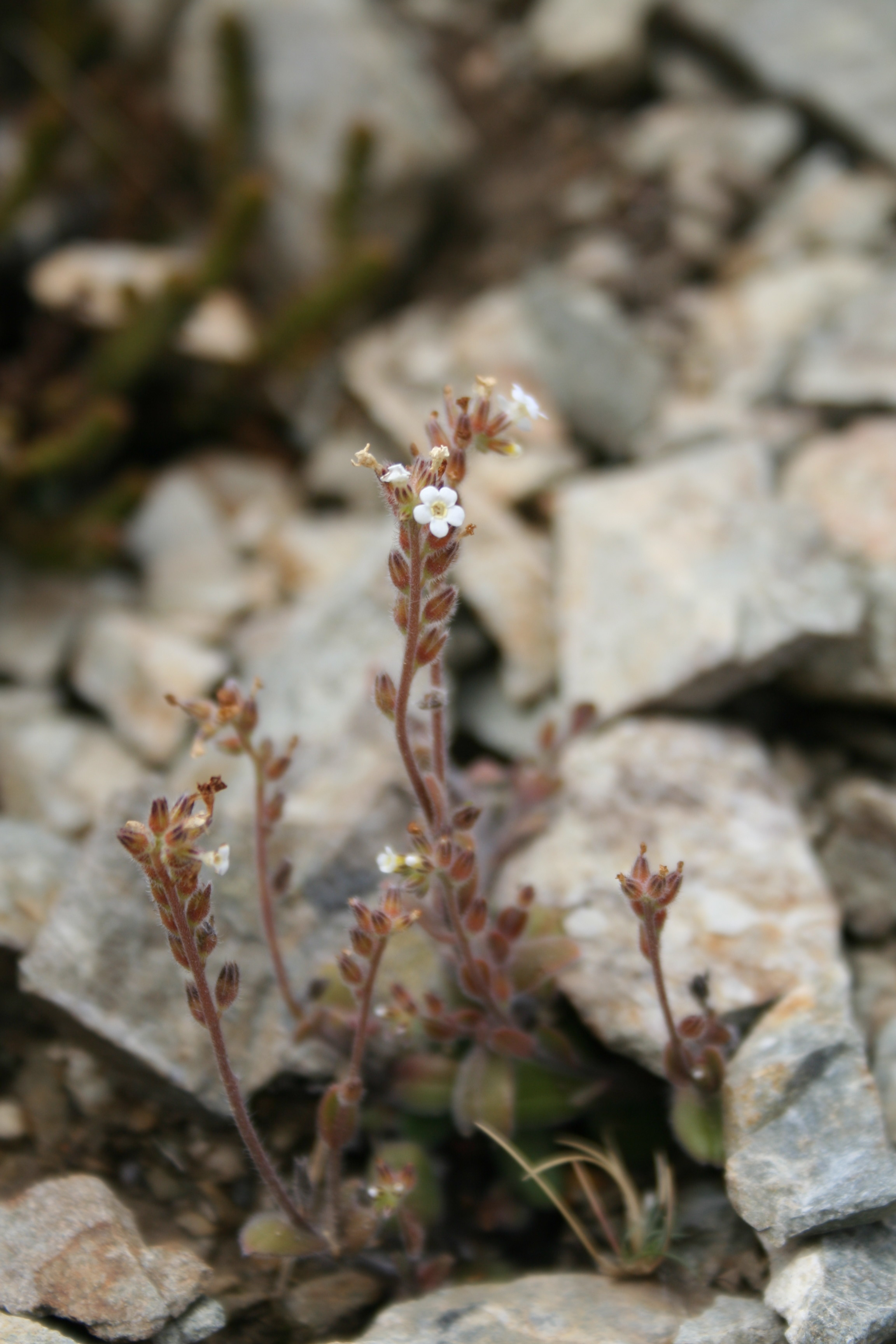
- Habit of Myosotis australis subsp. australis, New Zealand

Conservation status
- Not Threatened (NZ TCS)

Scientific classification
- Kingdom: Plantae
- Clade: Tracheophytes
- Clade: Angiosperms
- Clade: Eudicots
- Clade: Asterids
- Order: Boraginales
- Family: Boraginaceae
- Genus: Myosotis
- Species: M. australis
- Subspecies: M. a. subsp. australis

Trinomial name
- Myosotis australis subsp. australis R.Br.

Synonyms
- Myosotis mooreana Lehnebach, Myosotis australis var. conspicua Cheeseman, Myosotis australis var. lytteltonensis Laing & A.Wall, Myosotis lytteltonensis (Laing & A.Wall) de Lange

= Myosotis australis subsp. australis =

Subspecies of flowering plant

Myosotis australis subsp. australis is a subspecies of flowering plant in the family Boraginaceae, native to New Zealand and Australia. Robert Brown described M. australis in 1810. Plants of this subspecies of forget-me-not are perennial rosettes with ebracteate inflorescences and white or yellow corollas with stamens that are fully included in the corolla tube or sometimes partly protruded.

== Taxonomy and etymology ==
Myosotis australis subsp. australis is in the plant family Boraginaceae. The species Myosotis australis R.Br. was originally described by Robert Brown in his Prodromus florae Novae-Hollandiae et Insulae Van Diemen 1810.

The lectotype was collected by Robert Brown on the "banks of Paterson River" (New South Wales, Australia), is lodged at the herbarium of the Natural History Museum (BM 000939408), and was designated by Carlos Lehnebach.

According to the latest taxonomic treatment, the following names are all synonyms of M. australis subsp. australis: Myosotis mooreana Lehnebach, M. lytteltonensis (Laing & A.Wall) de Lange (and M. australis var. lytteltonensis Laing & A.Wall; ), and M. australis var. conspicua Cheeseman.

This is one of two subspecies of M. australis recognized in the latest taxonomic treatment; the other is M. australis subsp. saruwagedica (endemic to New Guinea). The subspecies are allopatric (M. australis subsp. australis is native to Australia and New Zealand), and can be distinguished from one another using certain vegetative characters.

In the key to the two subspecies of M. australis, plants lacking hooked hairs on the underside of the uppermost cauline leaves, that have a rosette leaf blade usually narrowly obovate to oblanceolate and with a length to width ratio usually less than 4:1, and lacking stolons, key to M. australis subsp. australis. By contrast, plants with hooked hairs on the underside of the uppermost cauline leaves, that have a rosette leaf blade usually oblanceolate to narrowly oblanceolate and with a length to width ratio usually greater than 4:1, and are often stoloniferous, key to M. australis subsp. saruwagedica.

== Phylogeny ==
Three individuals of M. australis subsp. australis from Australia and New Zealand were included in a phylogenetic analyses of standard DNA sequencing markers (nuclear ribosomal DNA and chloroplast DNA regions). These same three individuals, plus five others from New Zealand (including one each identified as M. mooreana and M. lytteltonensis), were included in a subsequent phylogeny (two other New Zealand individuals identified as M. australis aff. were subsequently re-identified as other species).

In both studies, within the southern hemisphere lineage, the M. australis subsp. australis individuals were not monophyletic, but in general species relationships were not well resolved.

== Description ==
Myosotis australis subsp. australis plants are rosettes that are rarely stoloniferous. The rosette leaves have petioles that are 1–68 mm long. The rosette leaf blades are 2–69 mm long by 2–29 mm wide (length: width ratio 1.1–7.3: 1), usually narrowly oblanceolate, oblanceolate, narrowly obovate or obovate, widest at or above the middle, usually with an obtuse apex. Both surfaces of the leaf are uniformly and densely covered in flexuous, patent to erect hairs oriented parallel or oblique to the midrib. On the upper surface of the leaf, these hairs are antrorse (forward-facing) whereas on the lower surface, they are mostly retrorse (backward-facing), sometimes mixed with antrorse hairs. Each rosette has 1–17 ascending to erect, sometimes lax or decumbent (rarely prostrate or dwarfed), branched or unbranched, partially bracteate inflorescences that are not bifurcating at the top and are up to 630 mm long. The cauline leaves are similar to the rosette leaves, but become smaller, and have hairs similar to the rosette leaves. The flowers are 3–96 per inflorescence (rarely as many as 230), and each is borne on a short pedicel, with or without a bract. The calyx is 1–5 mm long at flowering and 2–7 mm long at fruiting, lobed to one-half to nearly all of its length, and densely covered in straight, flexuous or curved hairs, as well as some hooked hairs, all of which are mostly antrorse (with some retrorse or backward-facing hairs near the base). The longer calyx hairs are patent to erect whereas the shorter calyx hairs are appressed to patent. The corolla is white or yellow and 1–10 mm in diameter, with a cylindrical tube, petals that are usually broadly obovate to very broadly obovate, or ovate to very broadly ovate, and small white or yellow scales alternating with the petals. The anthers are usually fully included or sometimes partly exserted. The four smooth, shiny, usually medium to dark brown nutlets are 1.3–2.2 mm long by 0.6–1.7 mm wide and narrowly ovoid to broadly ovoid in shape.

The pollen of Myosotis australis subsp. australis is of the australis, uniflora, discolor and intermediate types.

The chromosome number of M. australis subsp. australis (as M. lytteltonensis; AK 252539) is 2n = 40.

Flowering and fruiting between September–June, with the main flowering period from September–December (Australia) and November–February (New Zealand). The main fruiting period for both countries is November–March.

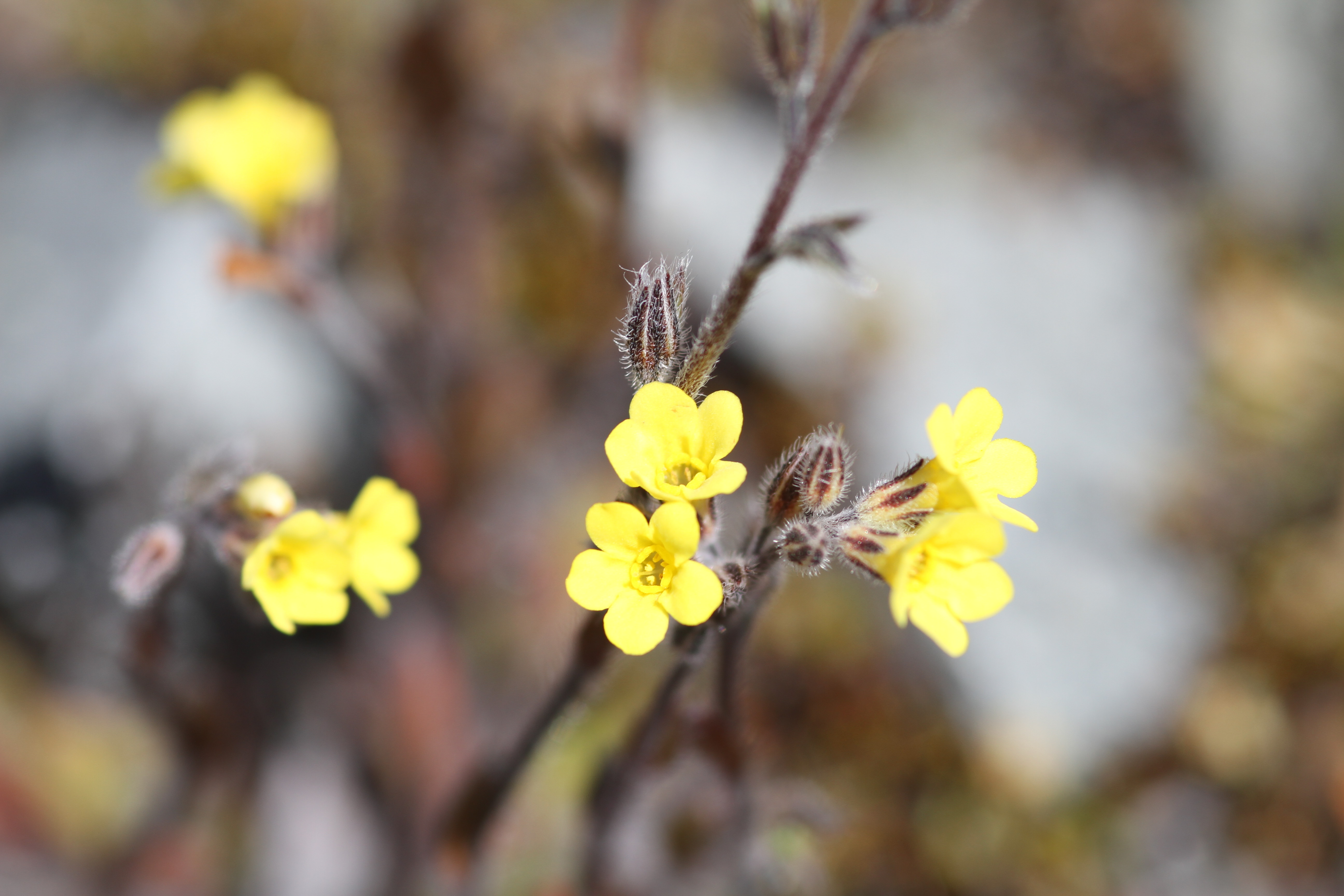
Yellow-flowered plant

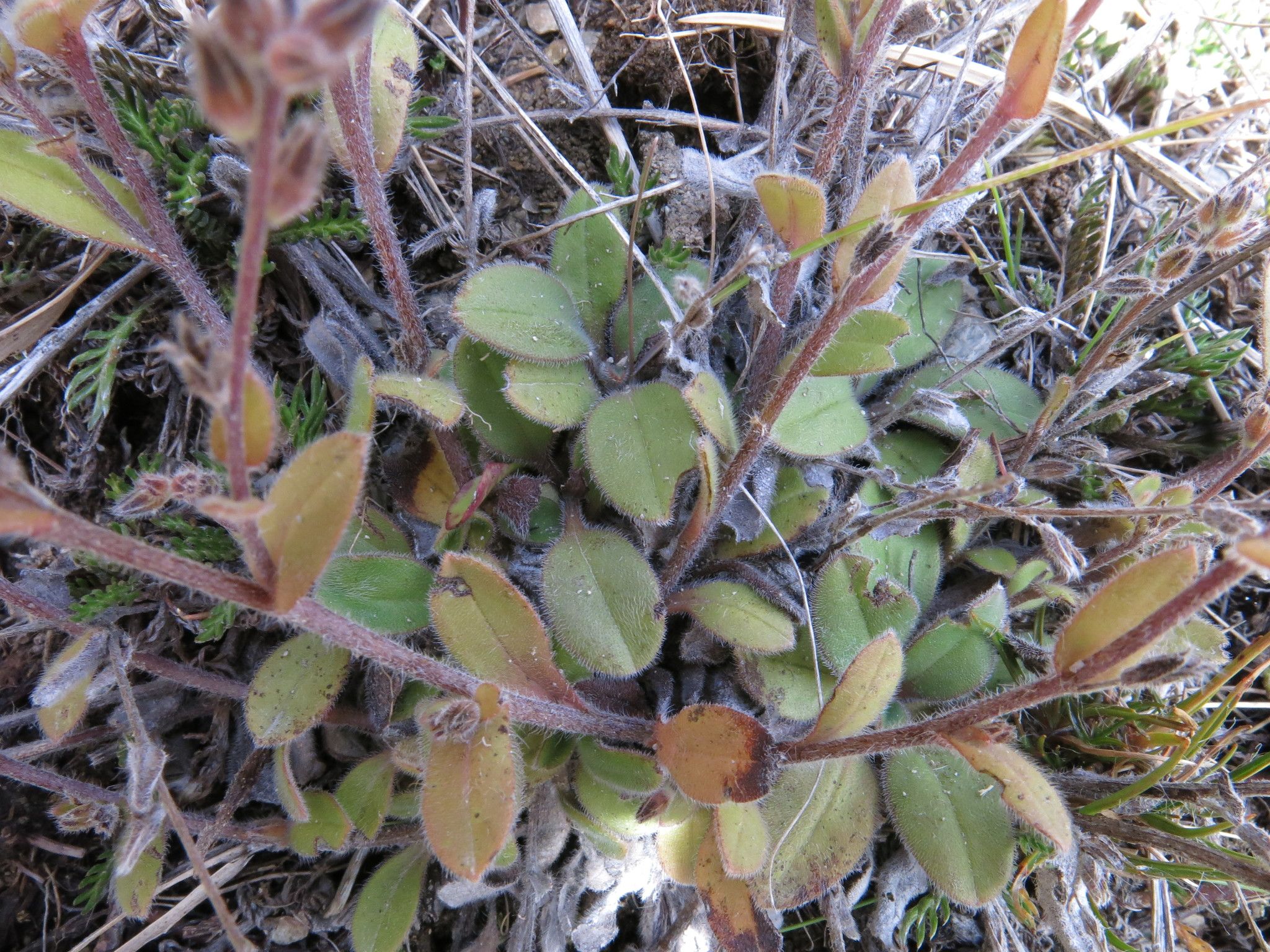
Rosette leaves

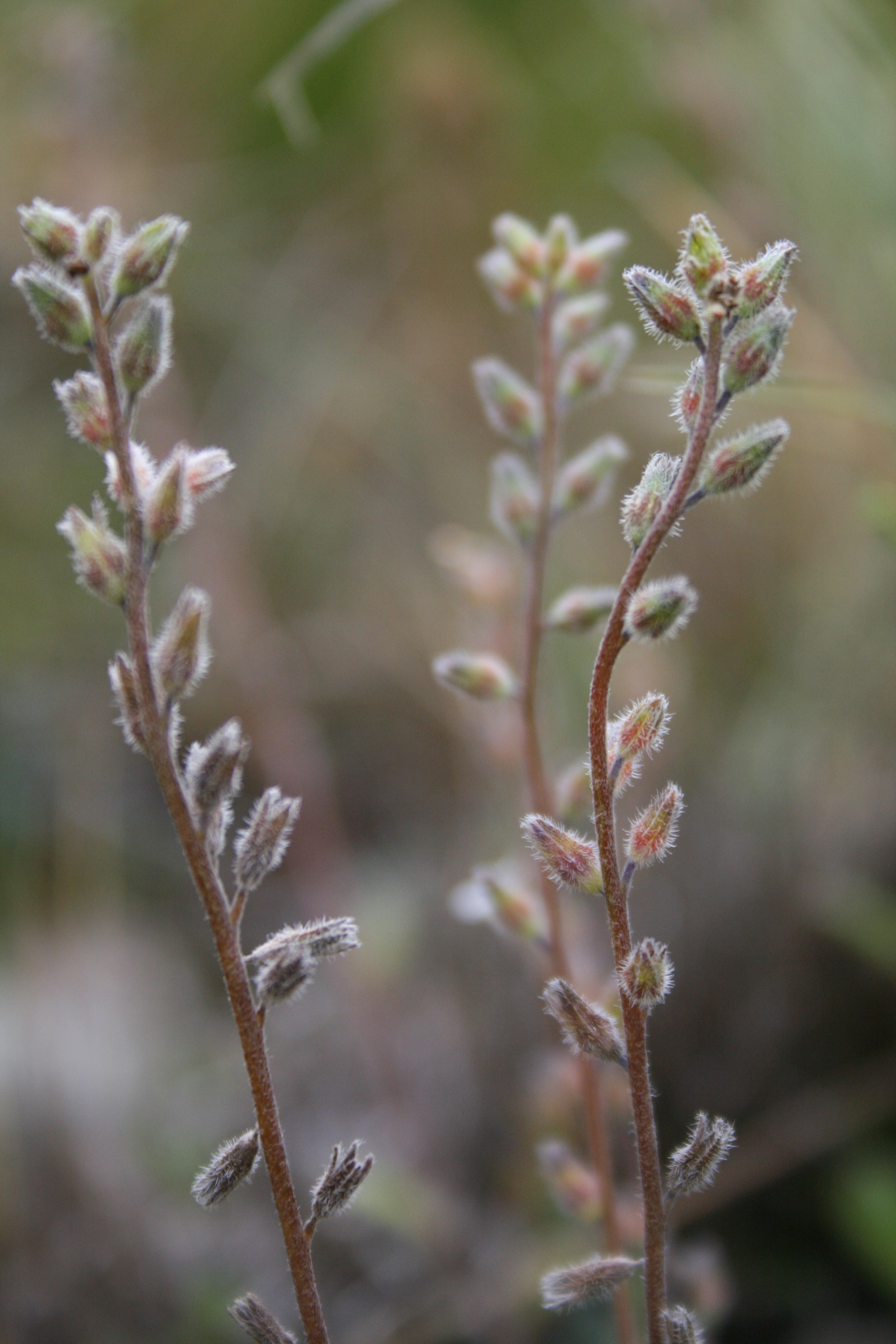
Fruits

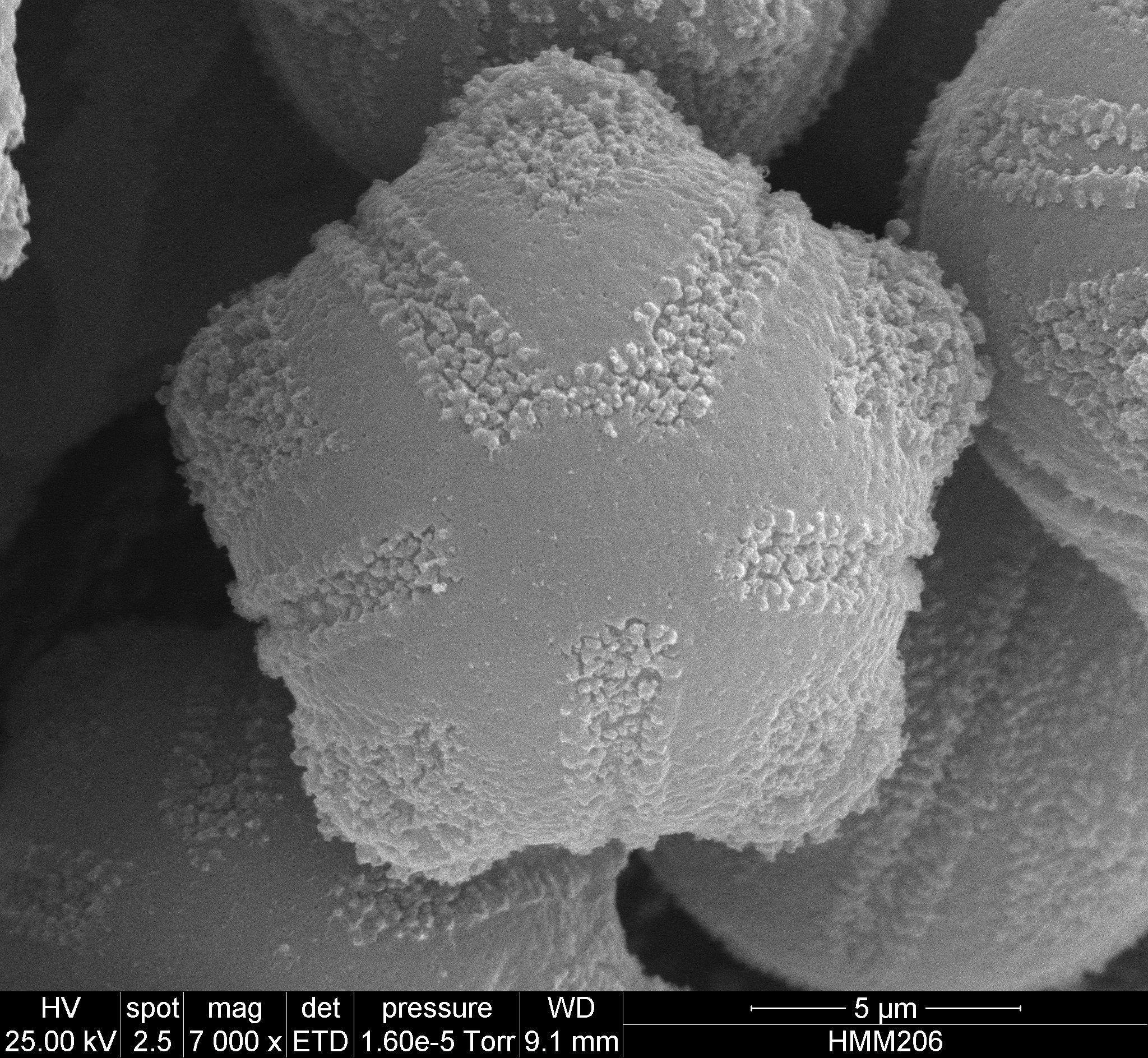
Pollen grain

== Distribution and habitat ==
Myosotis australis subsp. australis is native to New Zealand and Australia, where it is found from 0–2100 m ASL on rocks, bluffs, outcrops, ledges, scree, or banks.

In Australia, it is found in Western Australia, South Australia, New South Wales, Australian Capital Territory, Victoria and Tasmania.

In New Zealand it is distributed throughout the South island in Western Nelson, Marlborough, Canterbury, Westland, Otago, and possibly Fiordland, whereas on the North Island it is known only from the Volcanic Plateau and Southern North Island.

== Conservation status ==
Myosotis australis was listed as Not Threatened on the most recent assessment (2017-2018) under the New Zealand Threatened Classification system for plants. Synonyms M. mooreana and M. lytteltonensis had both been previously listed as Threatened Nationally Critical with the qualifiers DP, OL and Sp, and RR, Sp, respectively.

== Gallery ==
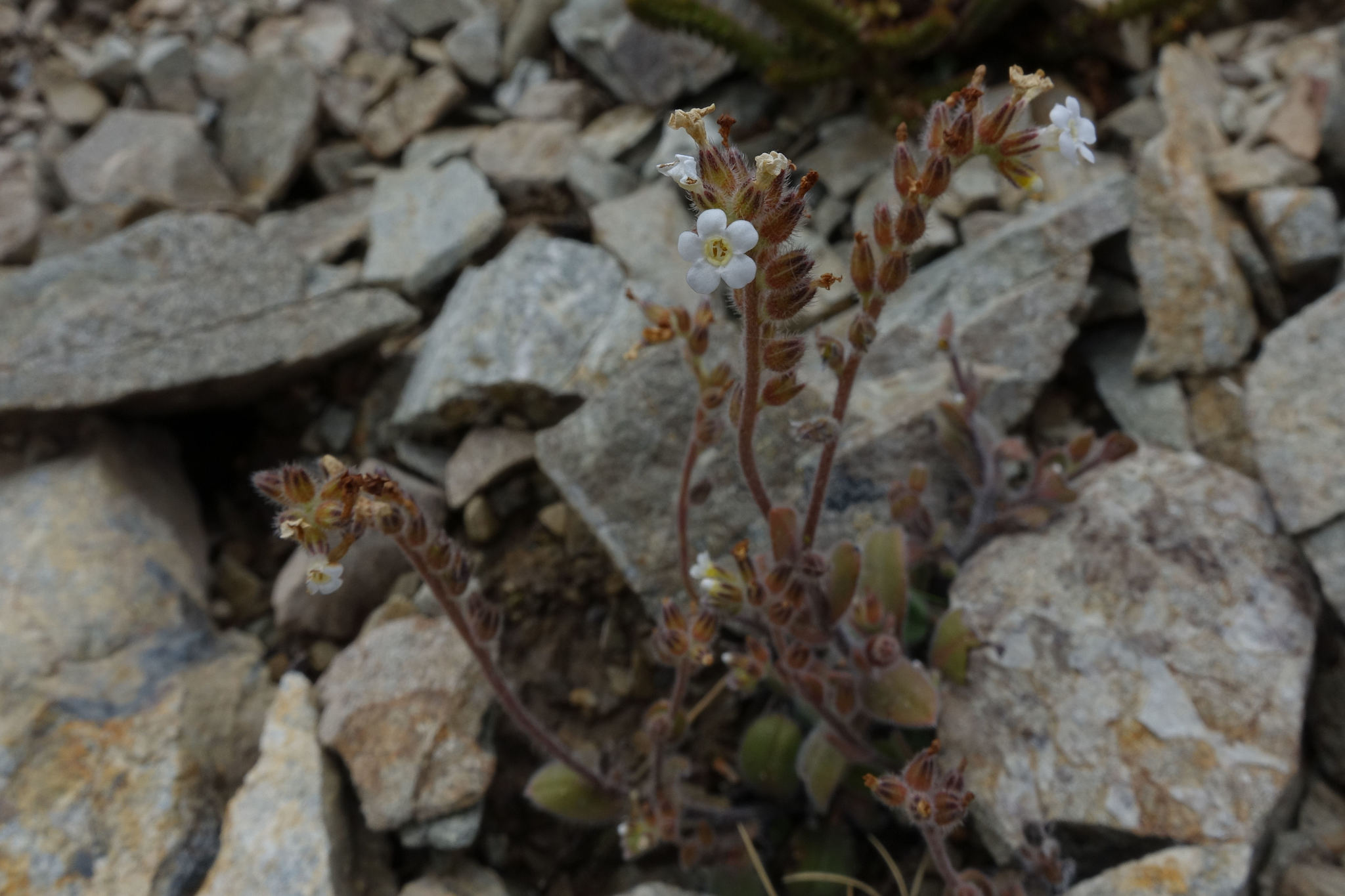

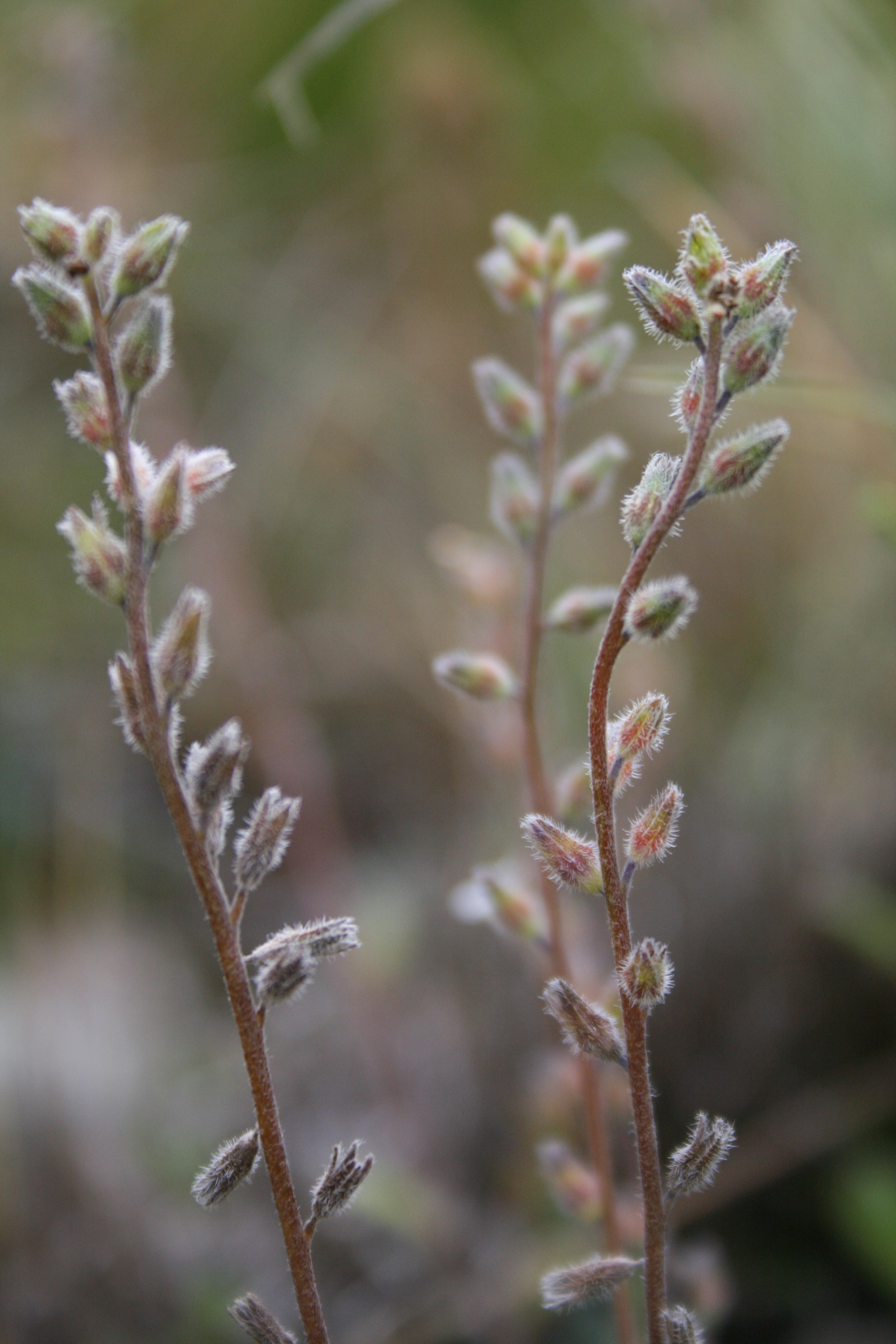

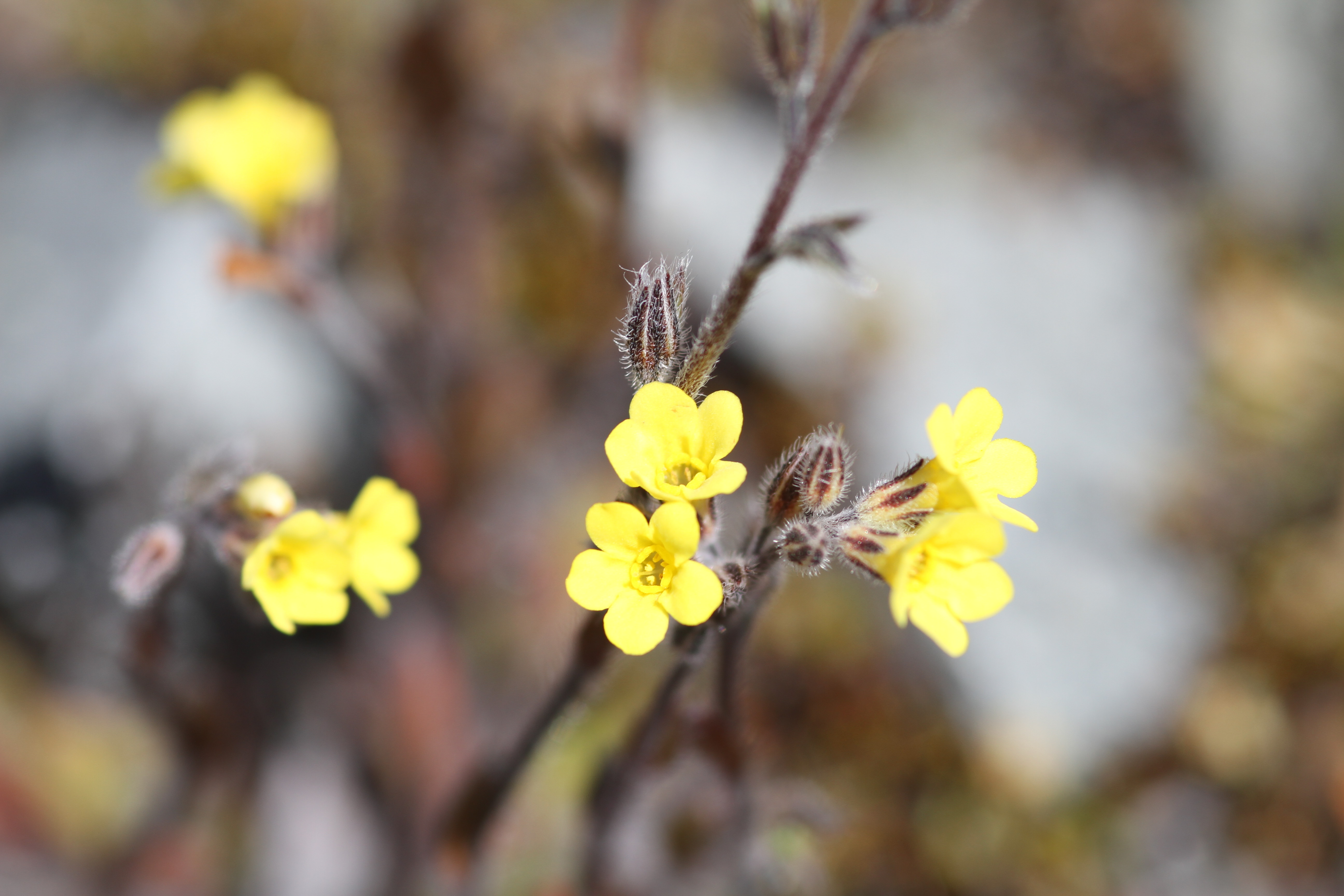

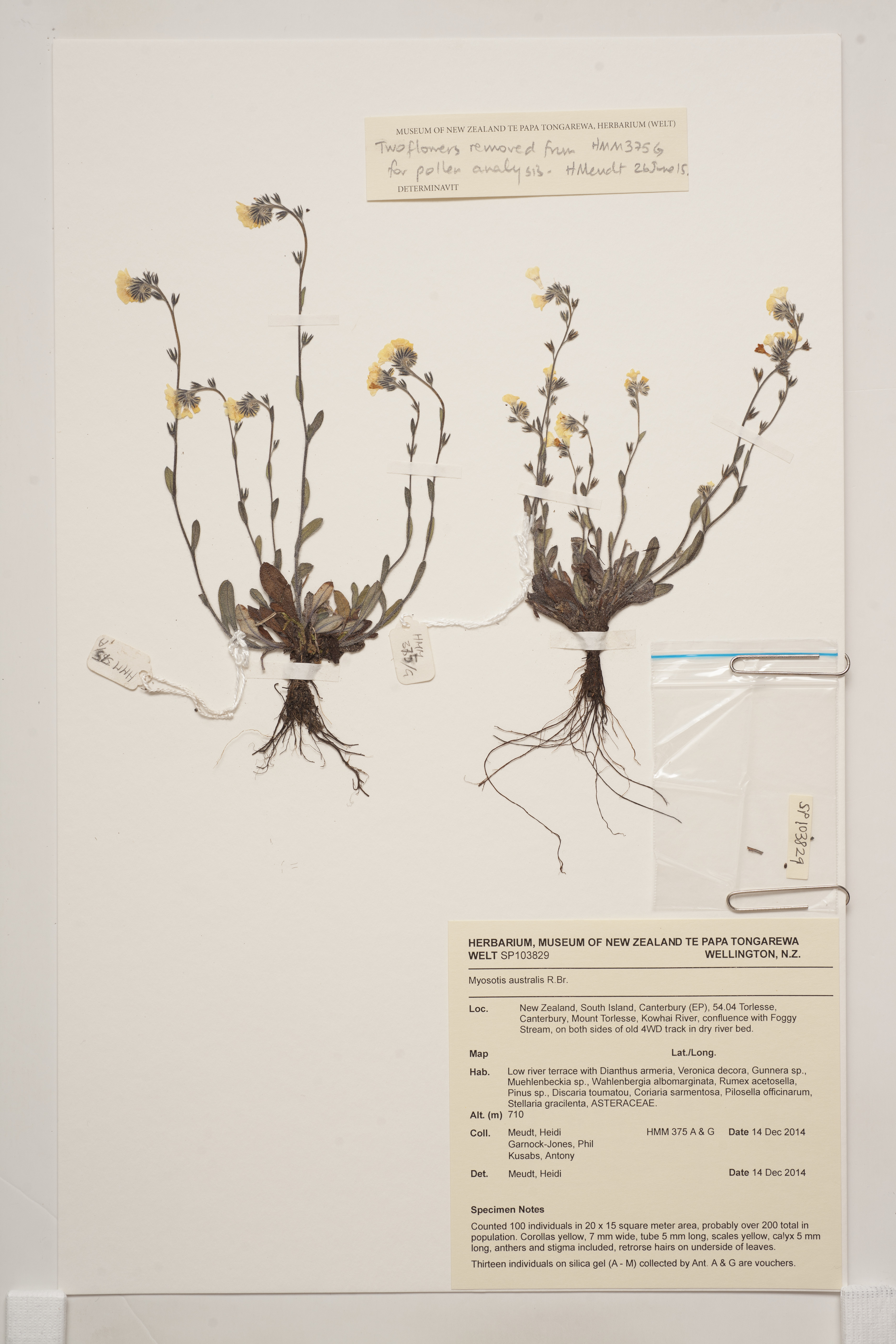

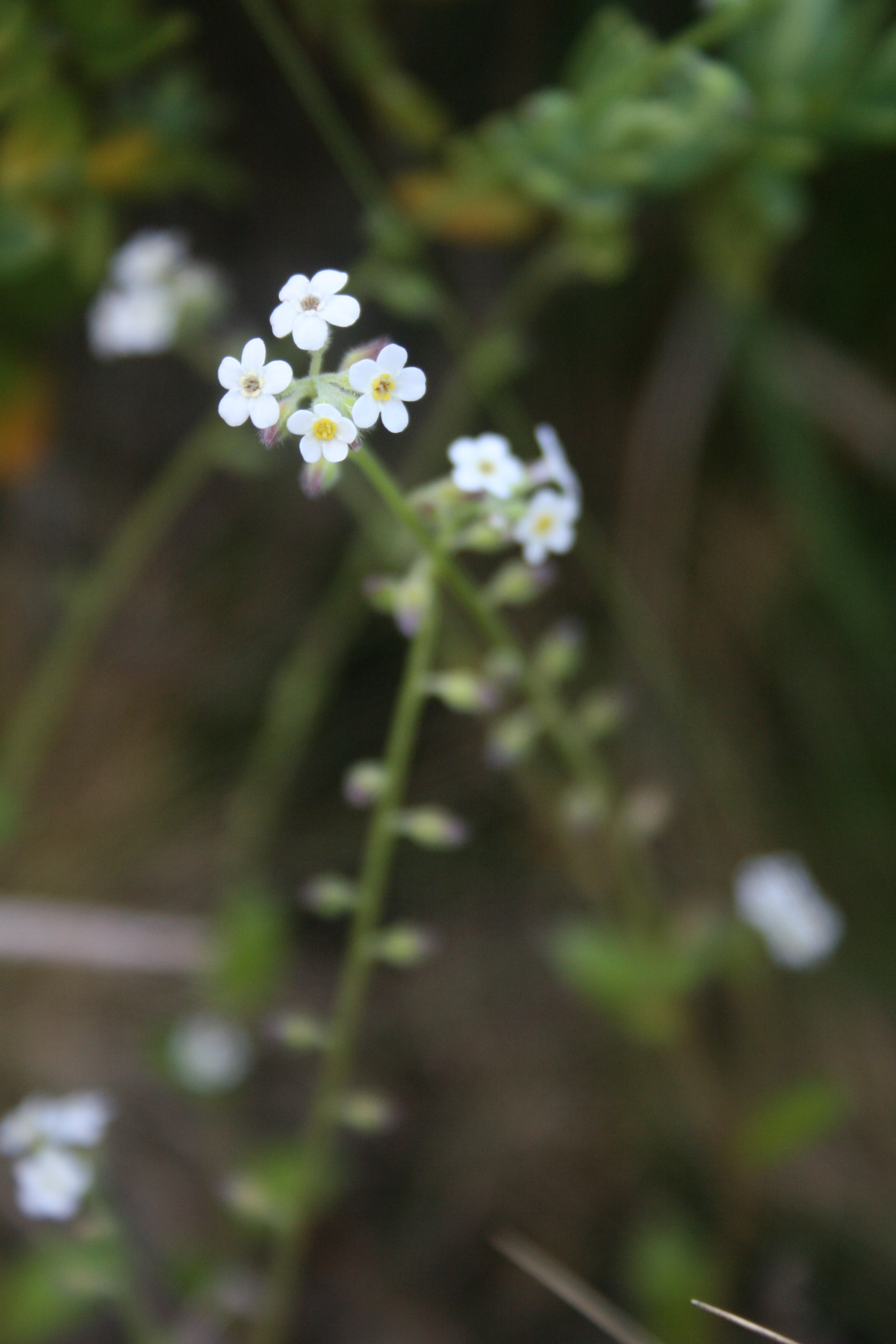

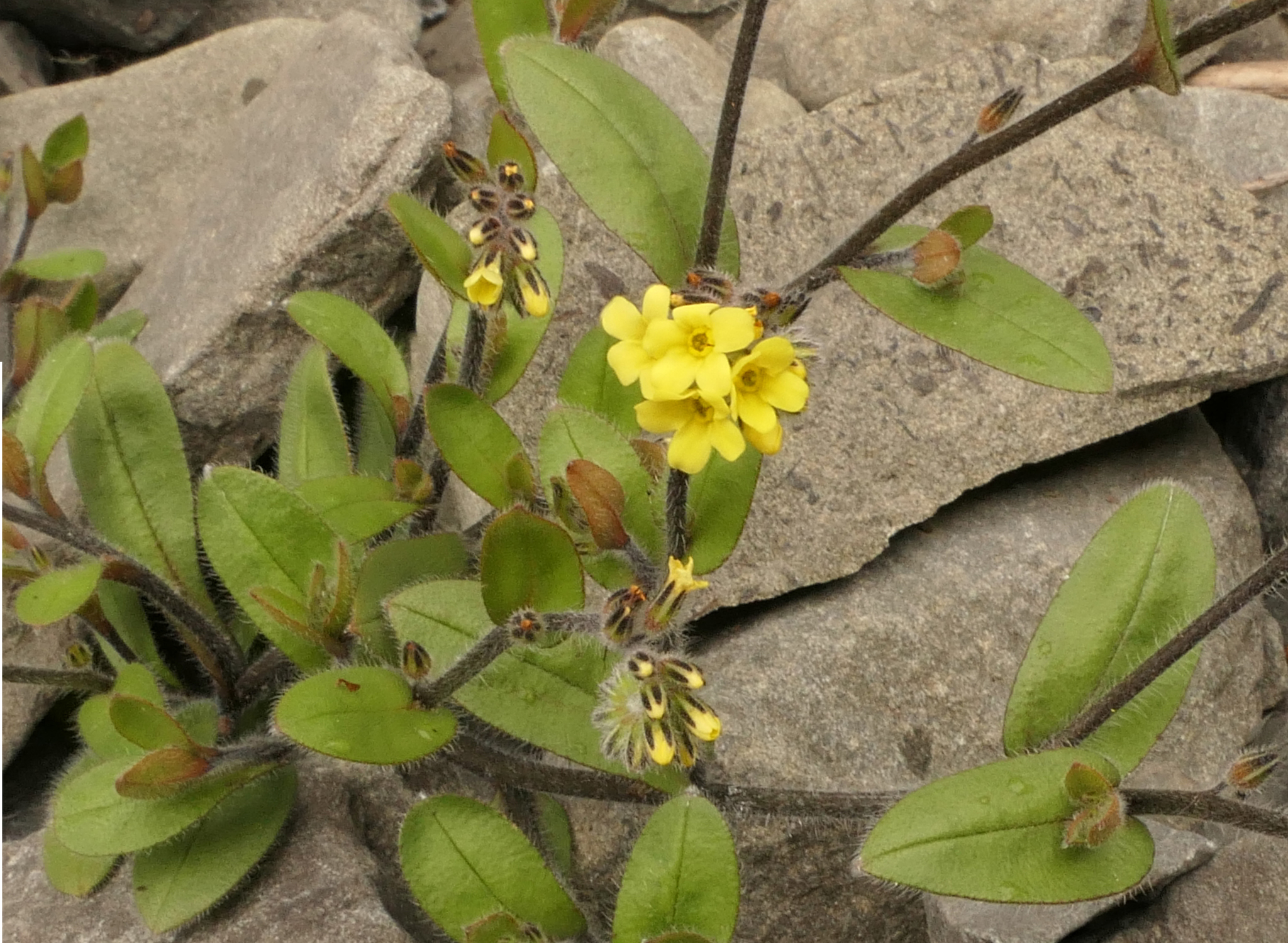

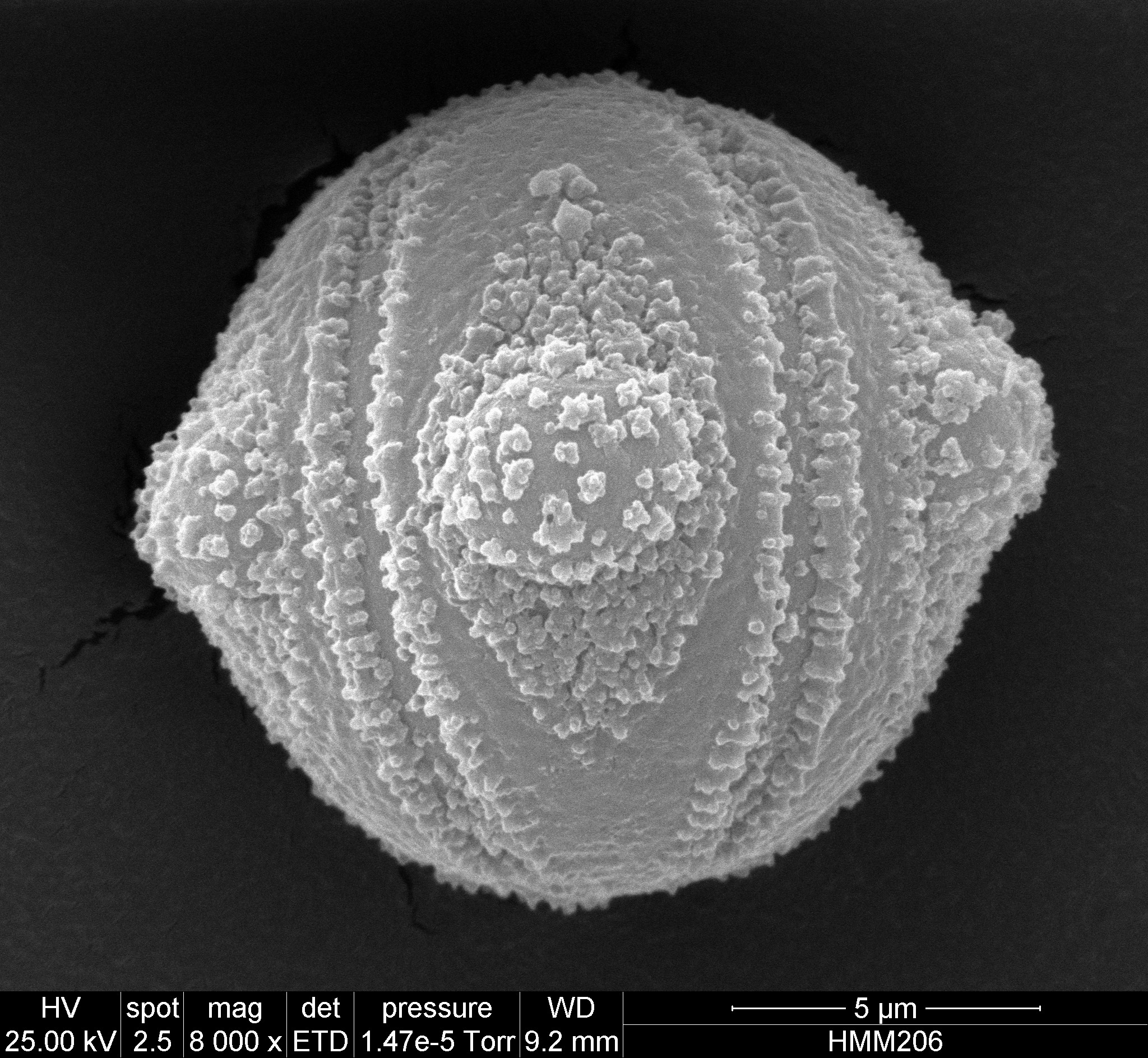
