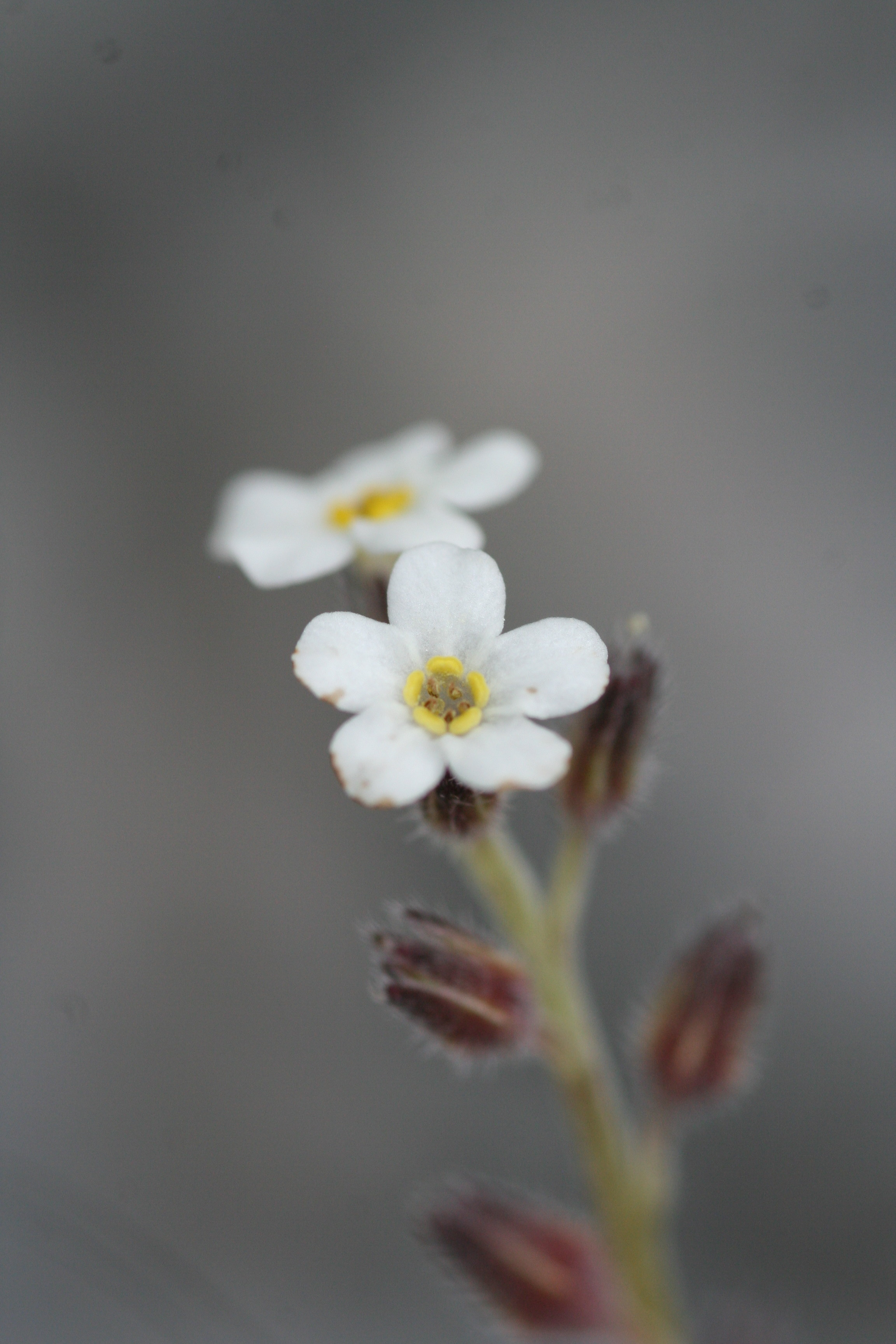
- Flowers of Myosotis australis

Conservation status
- Not Threatened (NZ TCS)

Scientific classification
- Kingdom: Plantae
- Clade: Tracheophytes
- Clade: Angiosperms
- Clade: Eudicots
- Clade: Asterids
- Order: Boraginales
- Family: Boraginaceae
- Genus: Myosotis
- Species: M. australis

Binomial name
- Myosotis australis R.Br.

Synonyms
- Myosotis mooreana Lehnebach; Myosotis australis var. conspicua Cheeseman; Myosotis australis var. lytteltonensis Laing & A.Wall; Myosotis lytteltonensis (Laing & A.Wall) de Lange

= Myosotis australis =

Species of flowering plant

Myosotis australis is a species of flowering plant in the family Boraginaceae, native to New Zealand, Australia and New Guinea. Robert Brown described this species in 1810. Plants of this species of forget-me-not are perennial rosettes with ebracteate inflorescences and white or yellow corollas with stamens that are fully included in the corolla tube or sometimes partly protruded.

== Taxonomy and etymology ==
Myosotis australis R.Br. is in the plant family Boraginaceae. The species was originally described by Robert Brown in his Prodromus florae Novae-Hollandiae et Insulae Van Diemen 1810.

The lectotype was collected by Robert Brown on the "banks of Paterson River" (New South Wales, Australia), is lodged at the herbarium of the Natural History Museum (BM 000939408), and was designated by Carlos Lehnebach.

Myosotis australis is morphologically most similar to other ebracteate-erect species from New Zealand, especially Myosotis saxatilis. Several morphological characters can be used to distinguish M. australis from M. saxatilis. The partially bracteate, distally non-bifurcating inflorescence in M. australis can help distinguish it from the obviously bifurcating, ebracteate inflorescence of M. saxatilis. In addition, M. australis has long internodes (>10 mm) between fruits at fruiting, whereas M. saxatilis has short internodes (<12 mm).

The species epithet australis is a Latin word that means south or southern, referring to its presence in Australia.

According to the latest taxonomic treatment, the following names are all synonyms of M. australis: Myosotis mooreana Lehnebach, M. lytteltonensis (Laing & A.Wall) de Lange (and M. australis var. lytteltonensis Laing & A.Wall;), and M. australis var. conspicua Cheeseman.

Two subspecies are recognised in the latest taxonomic treatment: Myosotis australis subsp. australis (native to Australia and New Zealand), and M. australis subsp. saruwagedica (endemic to New Guinea). The subspecies are allopatric, and can be distinguished from one another based on the presence of hooked hairs on the underside of the uppermost cauline leaves, length and length to width ratio of the rosette leaf blade, presence of stolons.

== Phylogeny ==
Four individuals of M. australis, including two from Australia, one from New Guinea, and one from New Zealand, were included in a phylogenetic analyses of standard DNA sequencing markers (nuclear ribosomal DNA and chloroplast DNA regions). These same four individuals, plus five others from New Zealand (including one each identified as M. mooreana and M. lytteltonensis), were included in a subsequent phylogeny (two other New Zealand individuals identified as M. australis aff. were subsequently re-identified as other species).

In both studies, within the southern hemisphere lineage, the M. australis individuals were not monophyletic, but in general species relationships were not well resolved.

== Description ==
Myosotis australis plants are rosettes that are sometimes stoloniferous. The rosette leaves have petioles that are 1–68 mm long. The rosette leaf blades are 2–73 mm long by 2–29 mm wide (length: width ratio 1.1–7.7: 1), usually narrowly oblanceolate, oblanceolate, narrowly obovate, obovate, or very broadly obovate, usually widest at or above the middle, an acute or obtuse apex. Both surfaces of the leaf are uniformly and densely covered in flexuous, patent to erect hairs oriented parallel or oblique to the midrib. On the upper surface of the leaf, these hairs are antrorse (forward-facing) whereas on the lower surface, they are a mixture of antrorse and retrorse (backward-facing). Each rosette has 1–17 ascending to erect, sometimes lax or decumbent (rarely prostrate or dwarfed), branched or unbranched, partially bracteate inflorescences that are not bifurcating at the top and are up to 630 mm long. The cauline leaves are similar to the rosette leaves, but become smaller. The flowers are 3–96 per inflorescence (rarely as many as 230), and each is borne on a short pedicel, with or without a bract. The calyx is 1–5 mm long at flowering and 2–7 mm long at fruiting, lobed to one-half to nearly all of its length, and densely covered in straight, flexuous or curved hairs, as well as some hooked hairs, all of which are mostly antrorse (with some retrorse or backward-facing hairs near the base). The longer calyx hairs are patent to erect whereas the shorter calyx hairs are appressed to patent. The corolla is white or yellow and 1–10 mm in diameter, with a cylindrical tube, petals that are usually broadly obovate to very broadly obovate, or ovate to very broadly ovate, and small white or yellow scales alternating with the petals. The anthers are usually fully included or sometimes partly exserted. The four smooth, shiny, usually medium to dark brown nutlets are 1.3–2.2 mm long by 0.6–1.7 mm wide and narrowly ovoid to broadly ovoid in shape.

The pollen of Myosotis australis is of the australis, uniflora, discolor and intermediate types.

The chromosome number of M. australis (as M. lytteltonensis; AK 252539) is 2n = 40.

Flowering and fruiting between September–June in New Zealand and Australia, but throughout the year in New Guinea. The main flowering periods are: Australia: September–December; New Zealand: November–February; and New Guinea: April–August. The main fruiting periods are: Australia and New Zealand: November–March; and New Guinea: April–August.

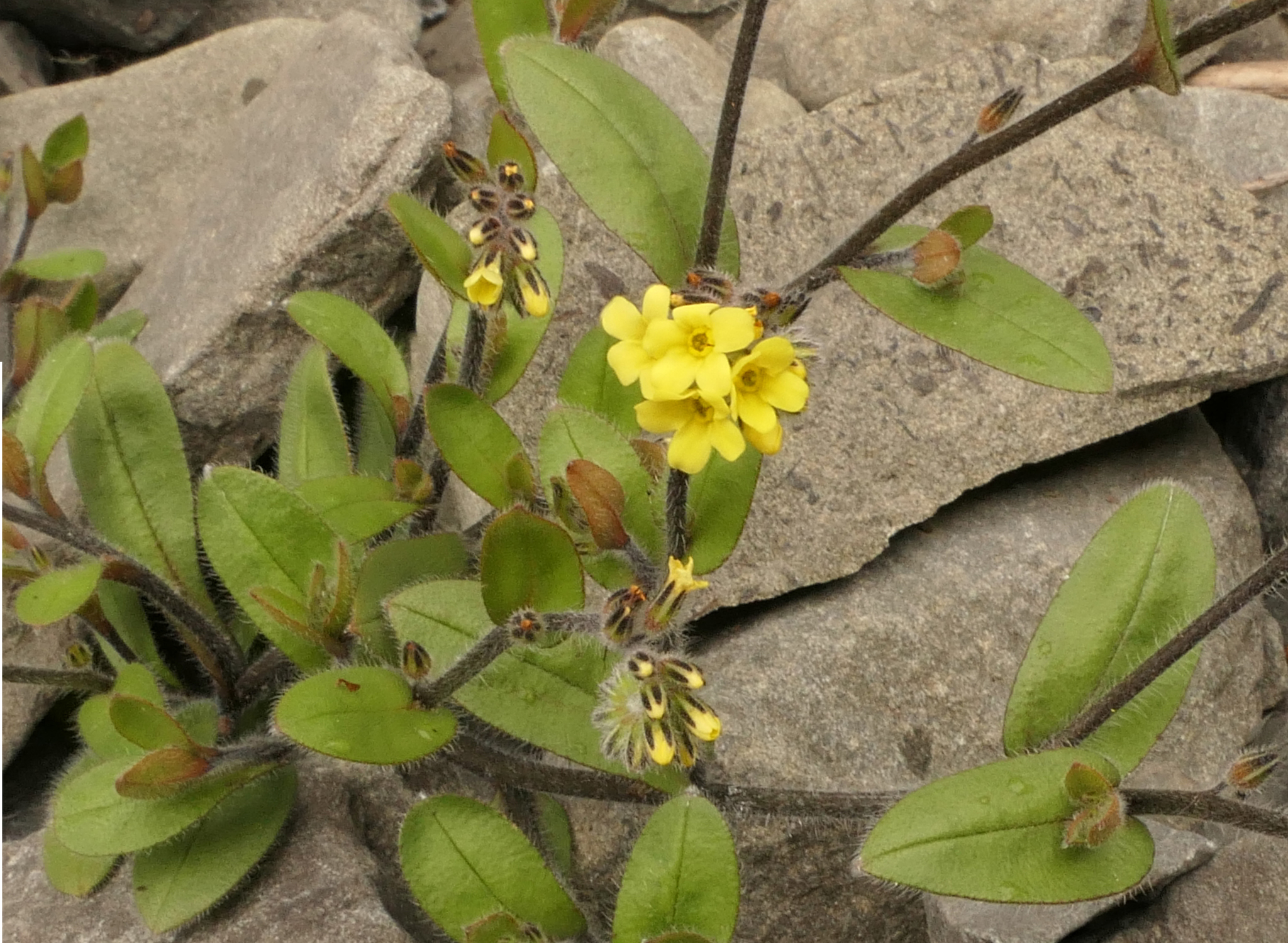
Yellow-flowered plant

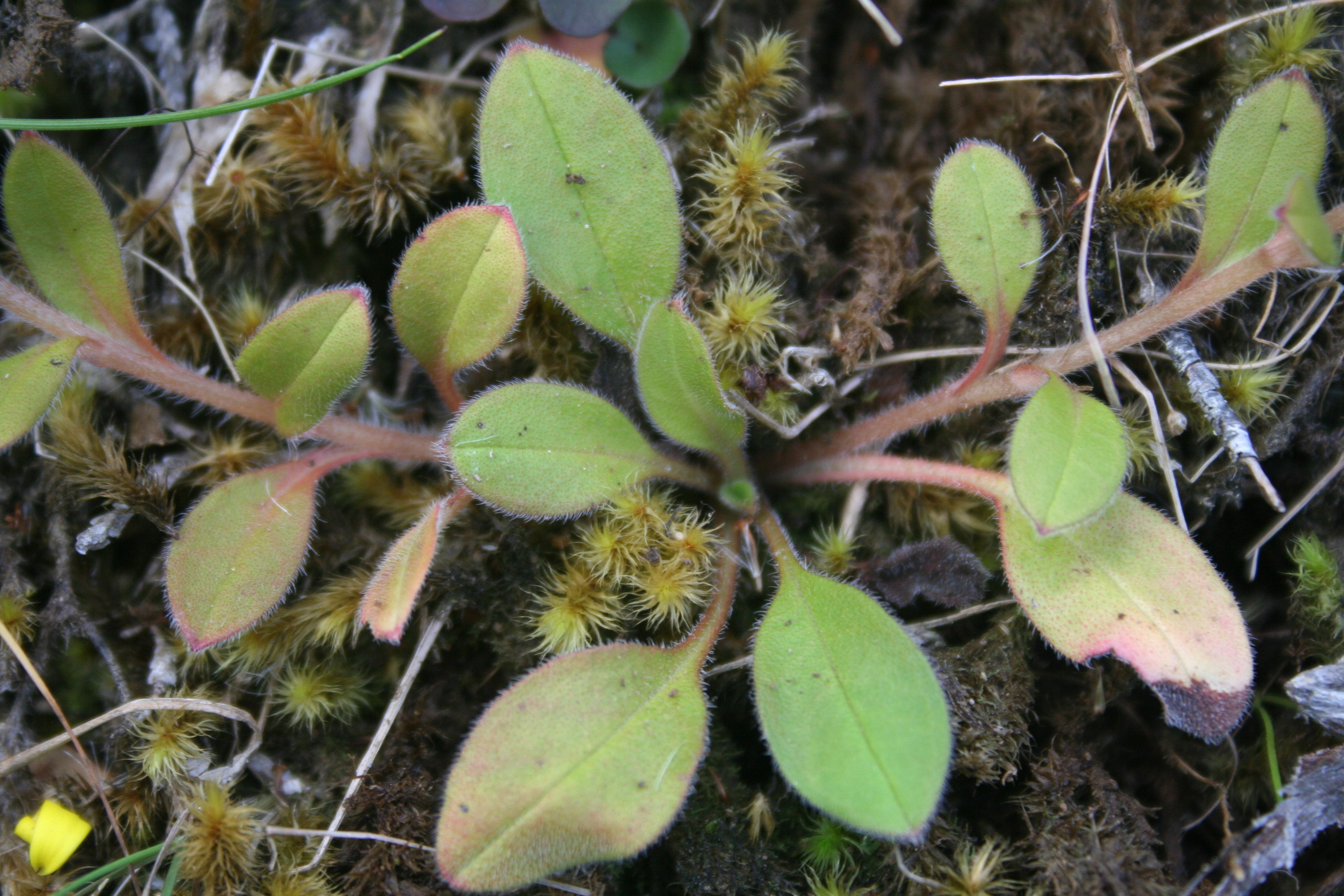
Rosette leaves

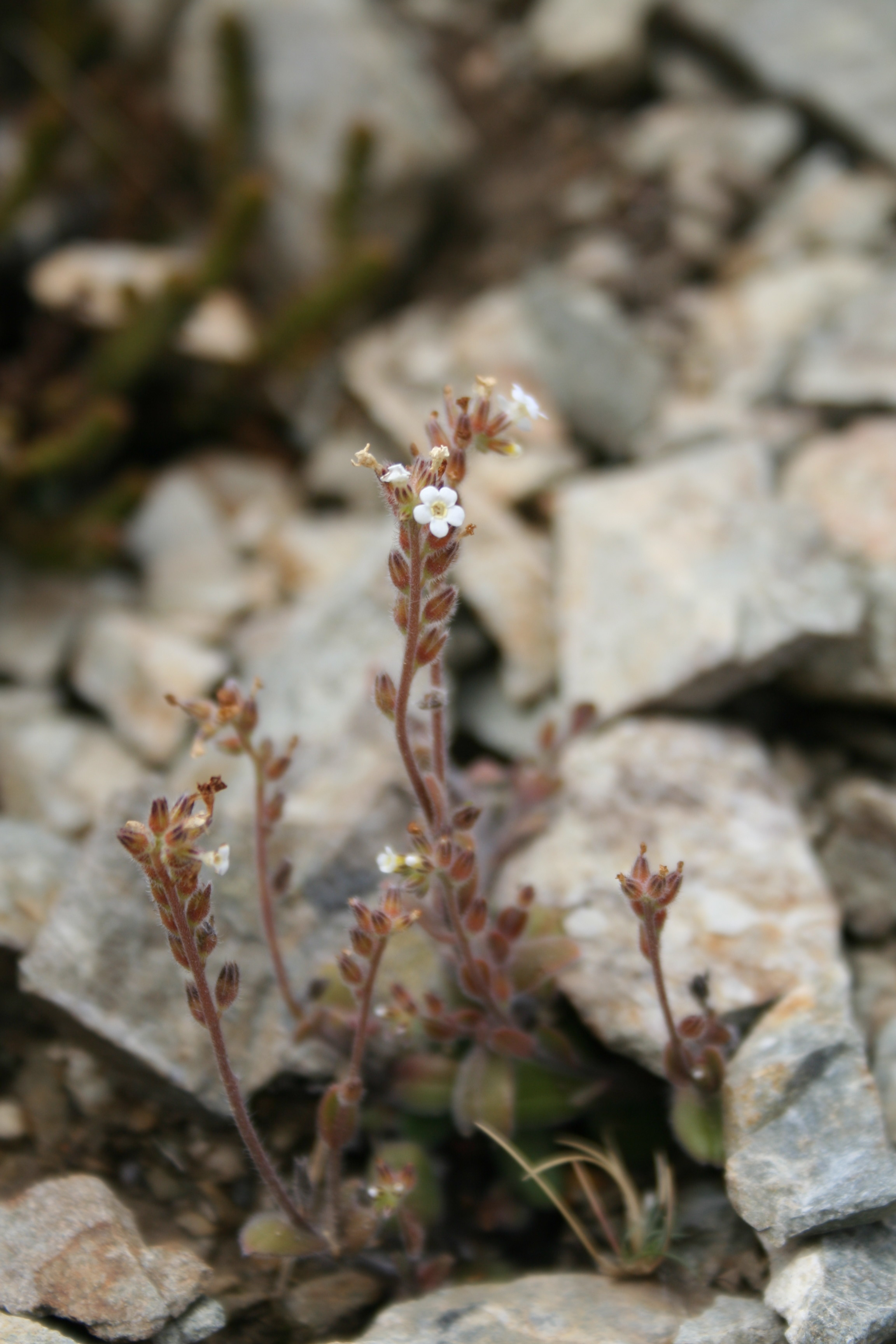
White-flowered plant

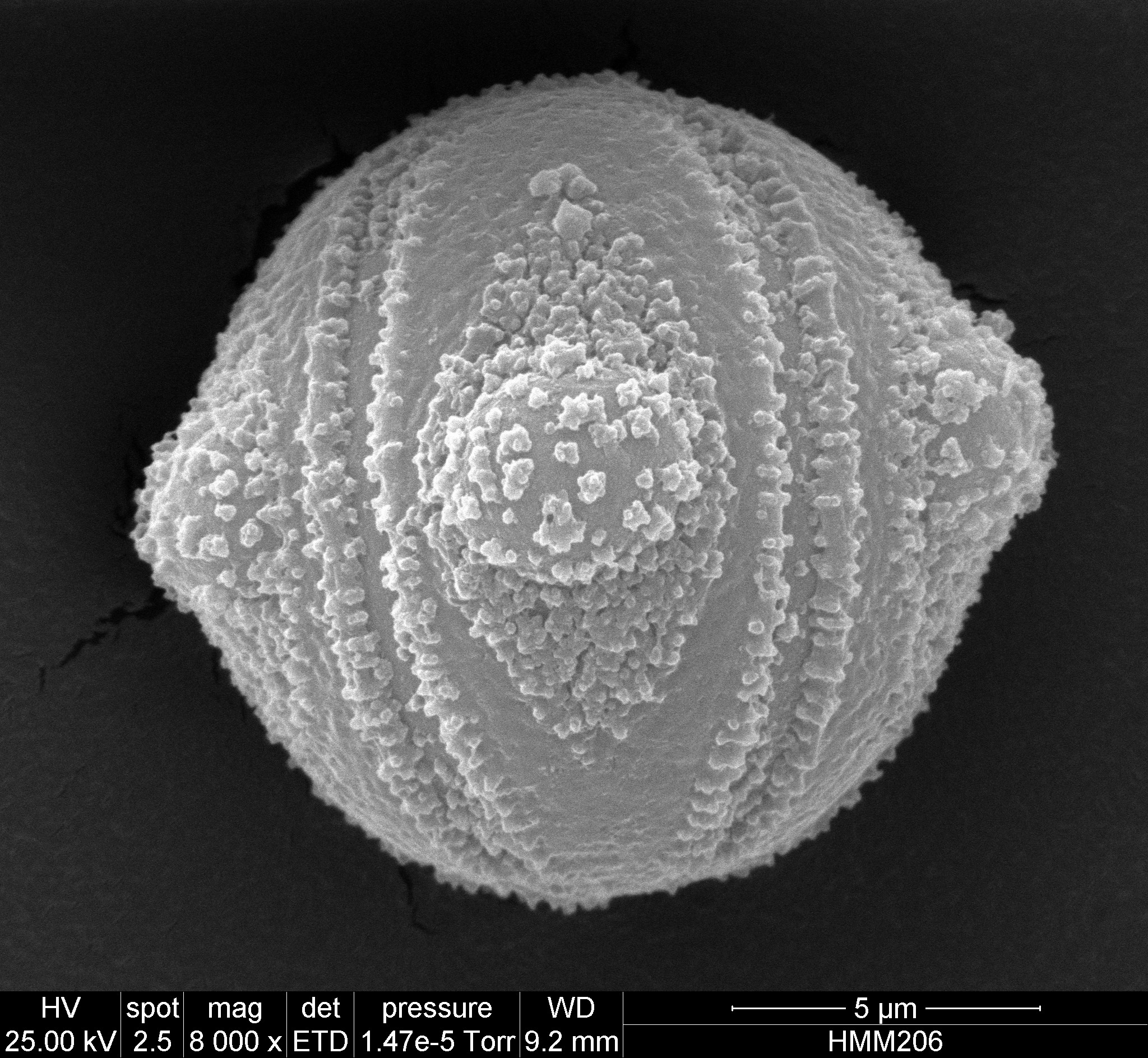
Pollen grain

== Distribution and habitat ==
Myosotis australis is native to New Zealand, Australia and New Guinea. It can be found from 0–2100 m ASL in New Zealand and Australia, and 1775–4350 m ASL in New Guinea. It is found on rocks, bluffs, outcrops, ledges, scree, or banks.

In Australia, it is found in Western Australia, South Australia, New South Wales, Australian Capital Territory, Victoria and Tasmania.

In New Zealand it is distributed throughout the South island in Western Nelson, Marlborough, Canterbury, Westland, Otago, and possibly Fiordland, whereas on the North Island it is known only from the Volcanic Plateau and Southern North Island.

In New Guinea it is found in both Western New Guinea (in Mimina and Puncak Jaya) as well as Papua New Guinea, in the following districts: Highlands (Chiumbu, Eastern Highlands, Enga, Hela, Southern Highlands, Western Highlands & Jiwaka), Momase (Morobe, West Sepik), and Southern (Central, Milne Bay).

== Conservation status ==
Myosotis australis was listed as Not Threatened on the most recent assessment (2017-2018) under the New Zealand Threatened Classification system for plants. Synonyms M. mooreana and M. lytteltonensis had both been previously listed as Threatened Nationally Critical with the qualifiers DP, OL and Sp, and RR, Sp, respectively.

== Gallery ==
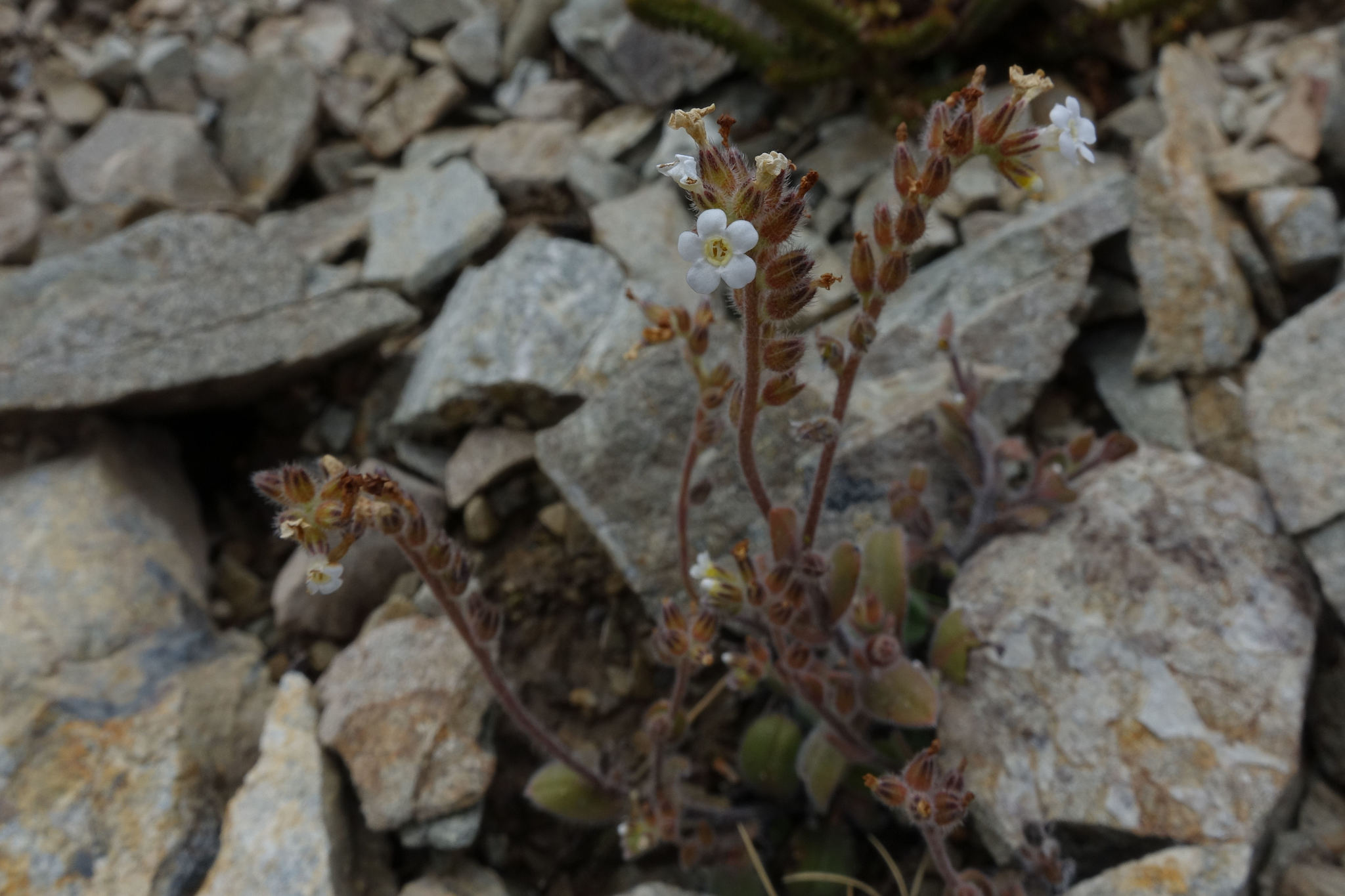

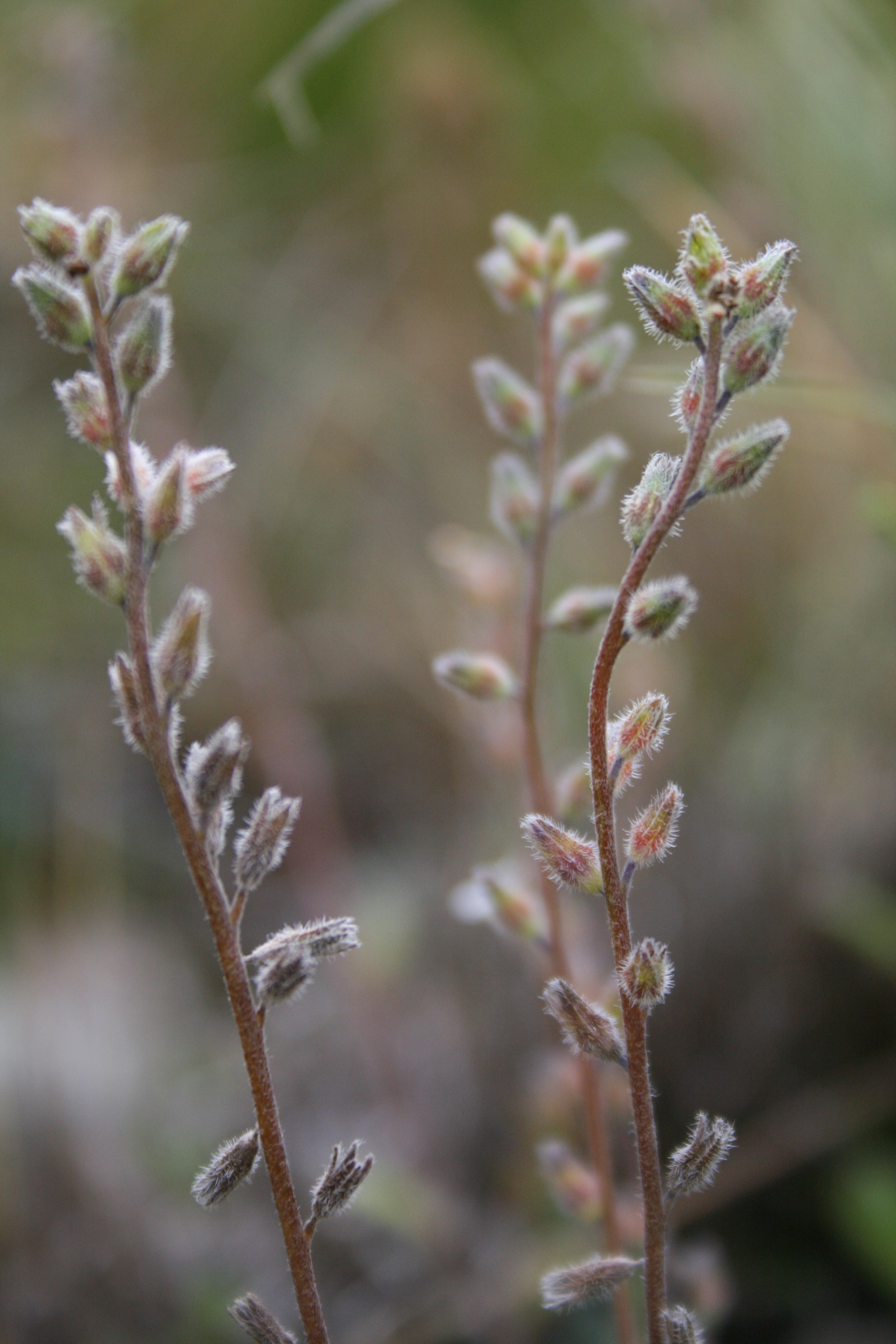

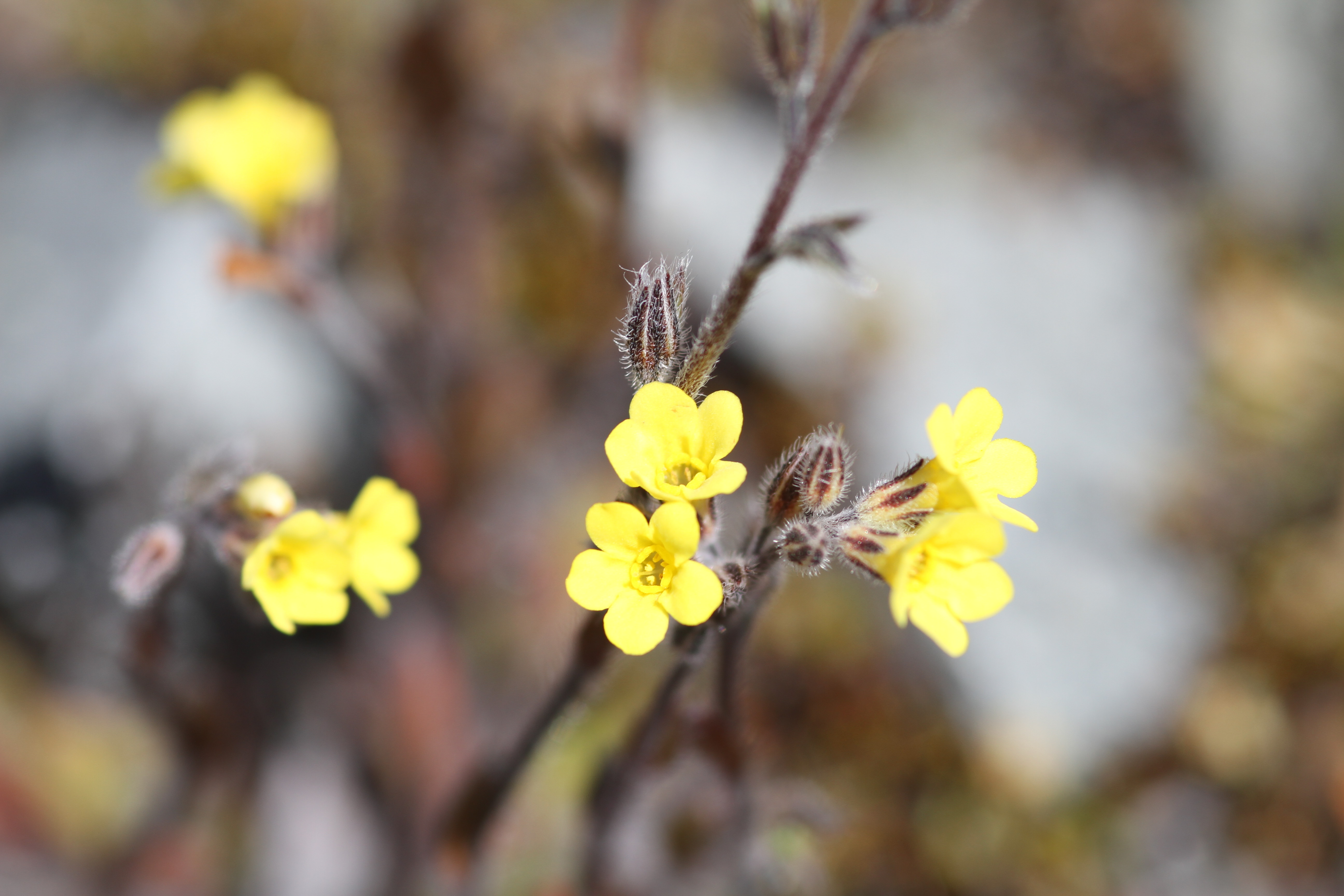

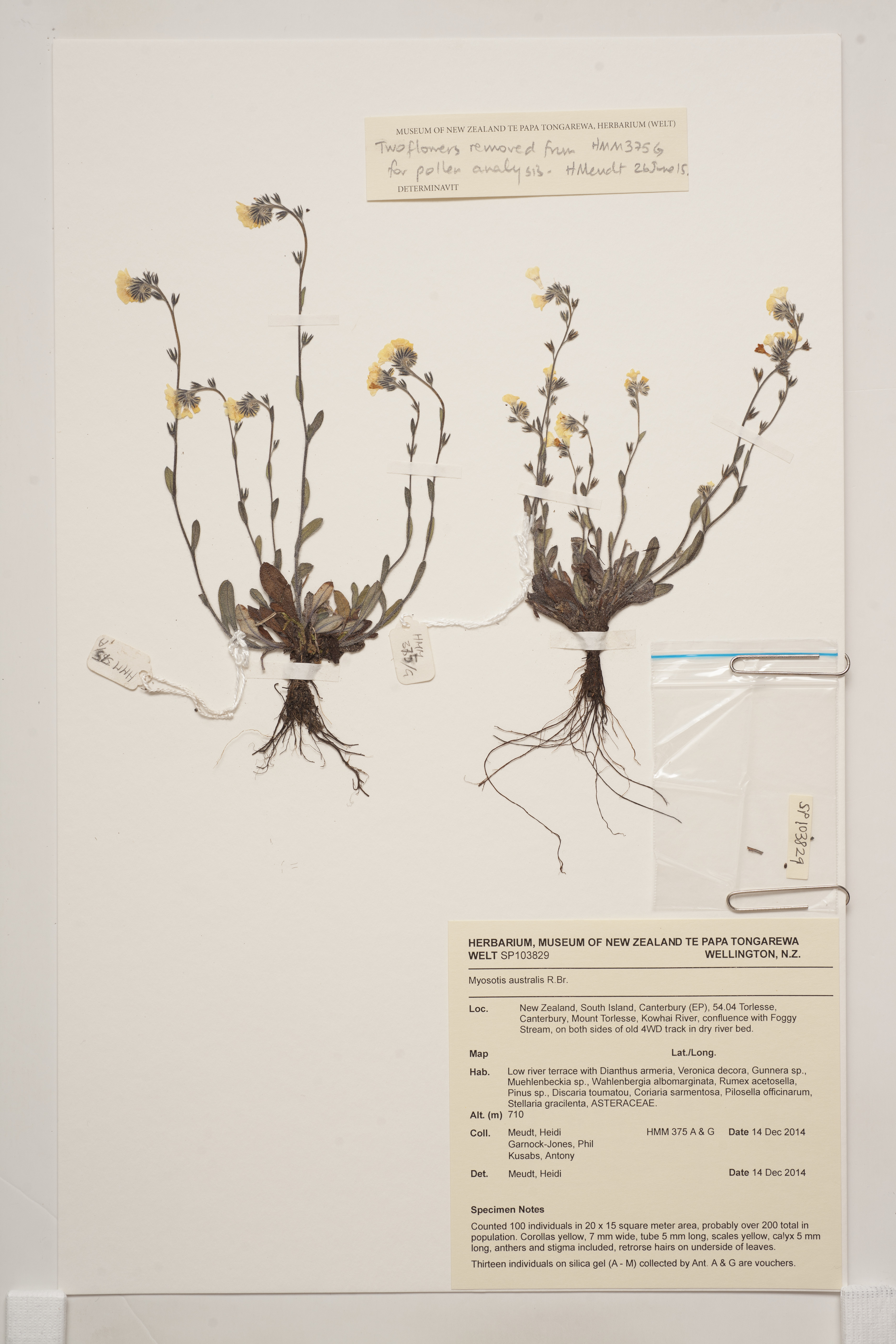

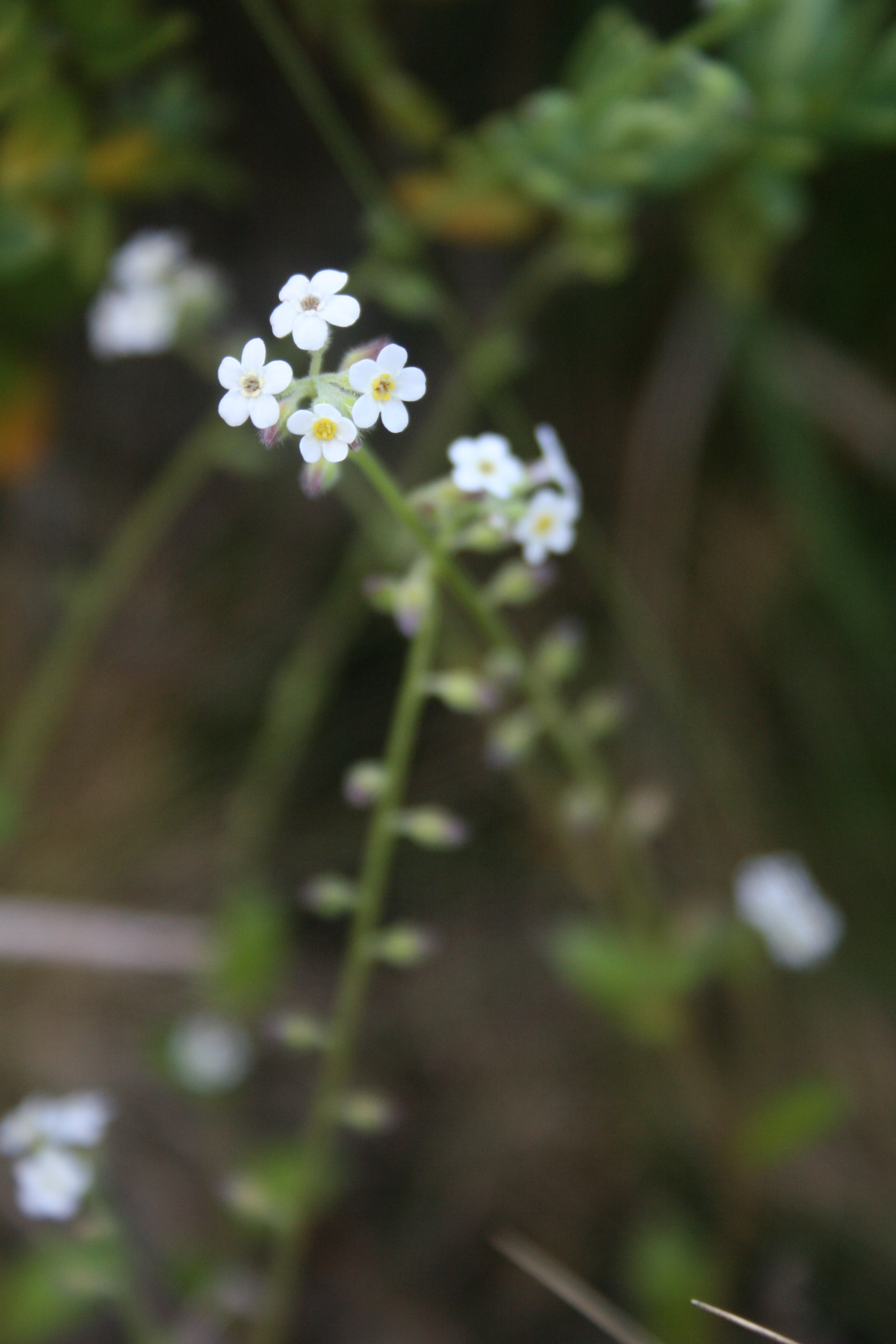

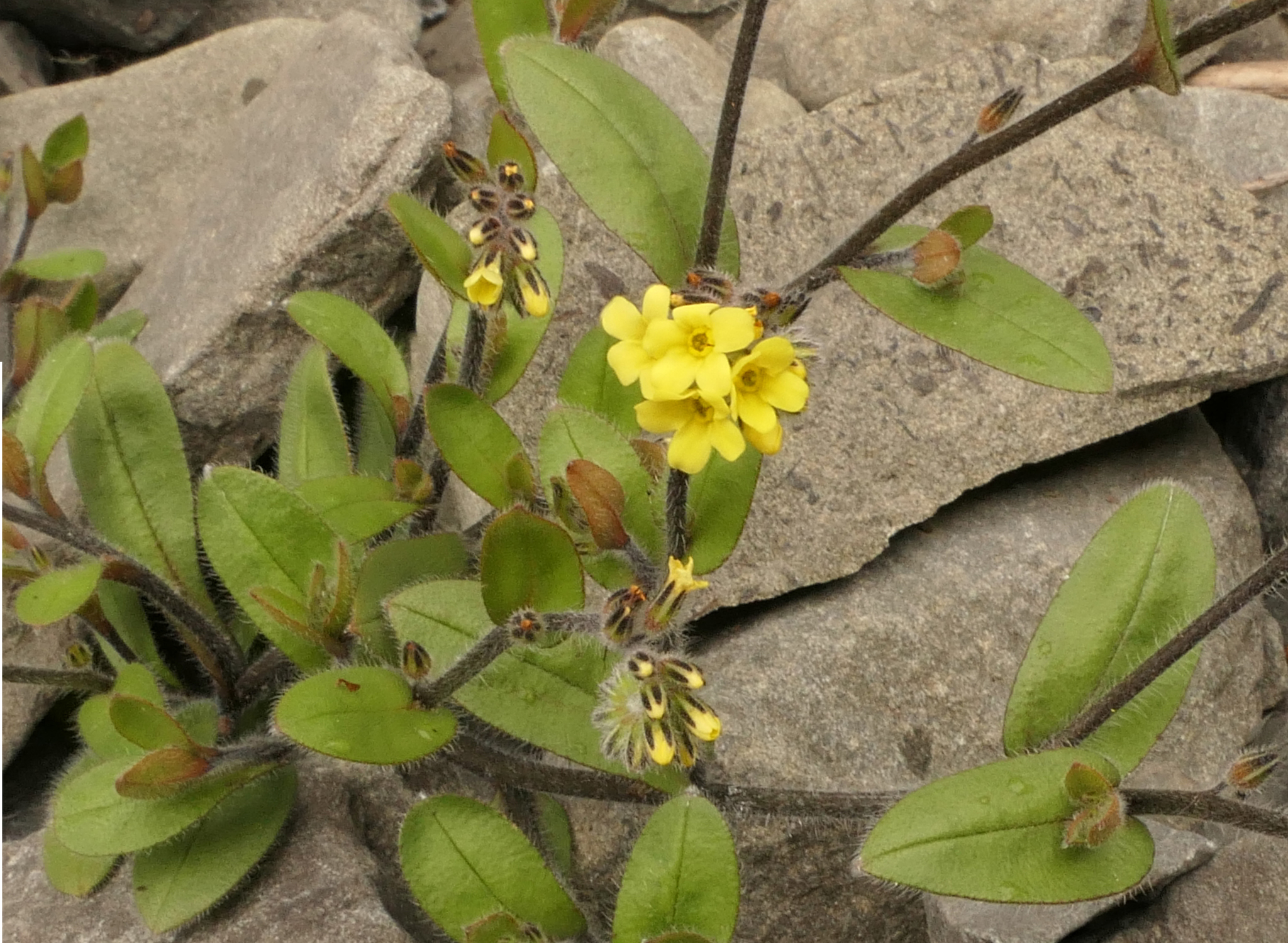

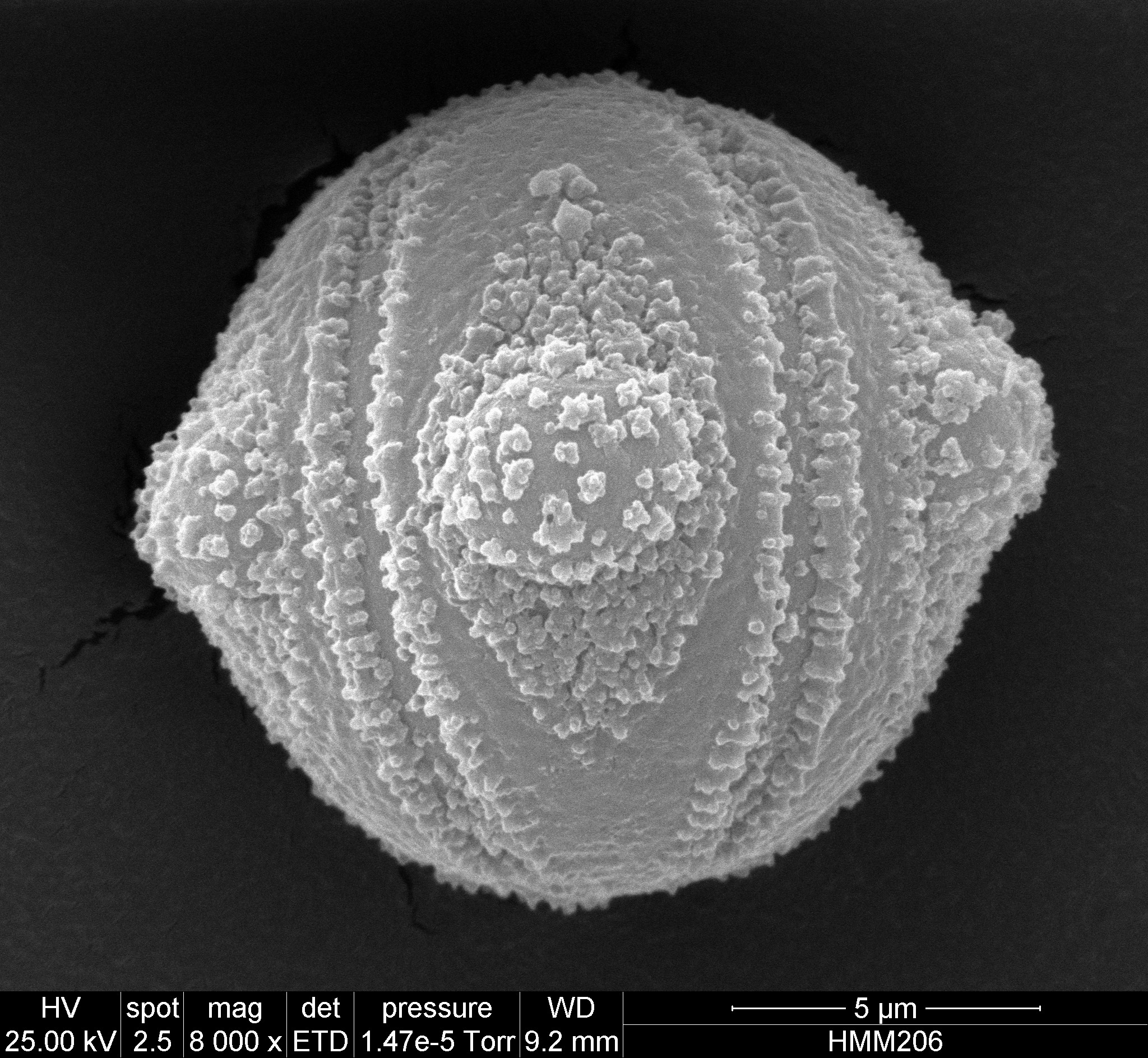
