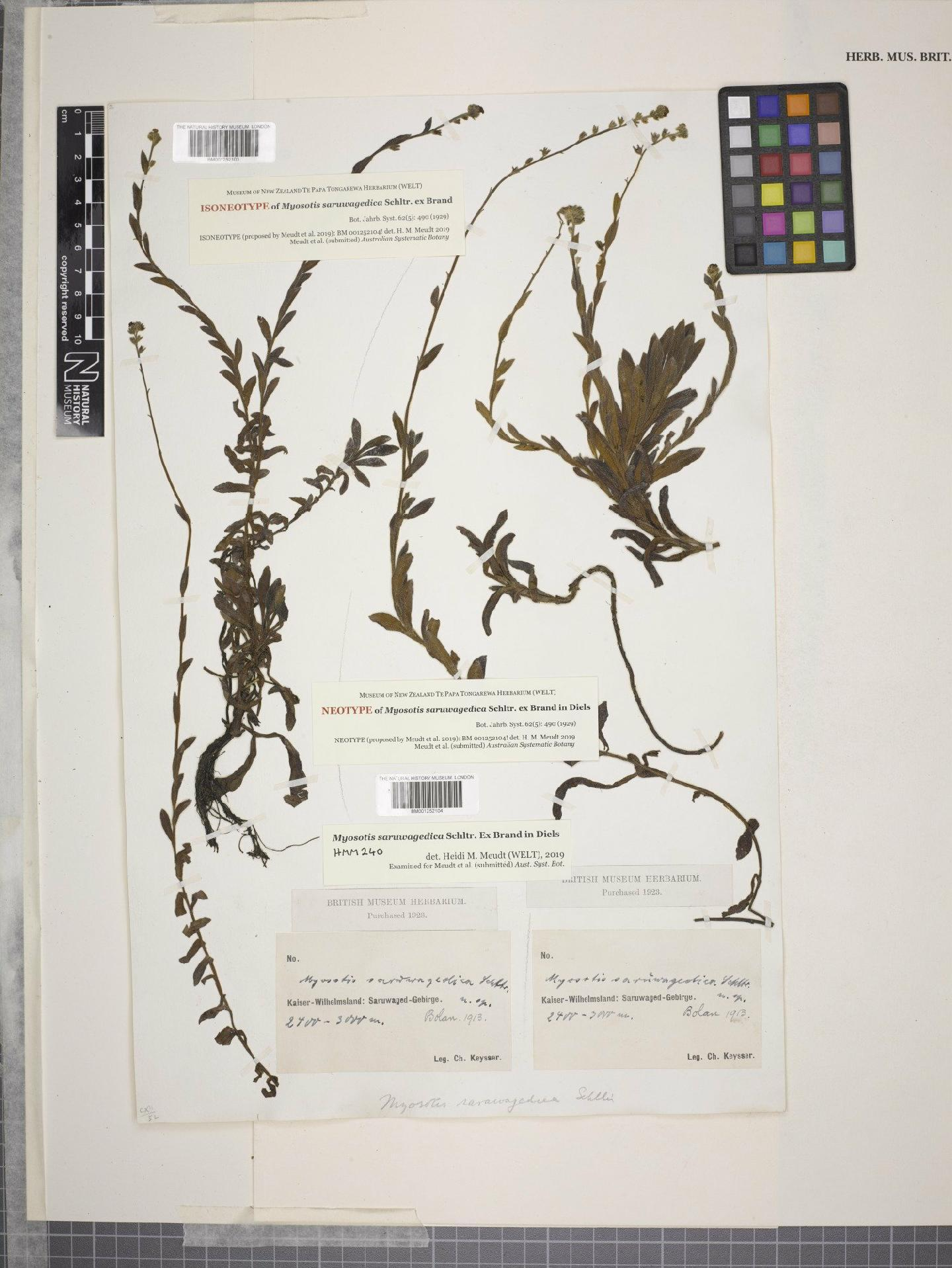
- Neotype specimen from the Natural History Museum

Scientific classification
- Kingdom: Plantae
- Clade: Tracheophytes
- Clade: Angiosperms
- Clade: Eudicots
- Clade: Asterids
- Order: Boraginales
- Family: Boraginaceae
- Genus: Myosotis
- Species: M. australis
- Subspecies: M. a. subsp. saruwagedica

Trinomial name
- Myosotis australis subsp. saruwagedica (Schltr. ex Brand} Meudt et al.

Synonyms
- Myosotis saruwagedica Schltr. ex Brand

= Myosotis australis subsp. saruwagedica =

Subspecies of flowering plant

Myosotis australis subsp. saruwagedica is a subspecies of flowering plant in the family Boraginaceae, endemic to New Guinea. August Brand described the species M. saruwagedica in 1929 and it was considered to be a synonym or a subspecies of M. australis by subsequent authors. Plants of this subspecies of forget-me-not are perennial rosettes with ebracteate inflorescences and white or yellow corollas with stamens that are fully included in the corolla tube or sometimes partly protruded.

== Taxonomy and etymology ==
Myosotis australis subsp. saruwagedica (Schltr. ex Brand) Meudt, Thorsen & Prebble is in the plant family Boraginaceae. The species Myosotis saruwagedica Schltr. ex Brand was originally described by August Brand, based on the manuscript of Rudolf Schlechter, in the Boraginaceae treatment for Ludwig Diels' paper, Beitrage zur Flora des Saruwaged-Gebirges (Contributions to the flora of the Saruwaged Mountains) in 1929. The species epithet saruwagedica refers to the type locality, the Saruwaged Range, New Guinea. It was considered to be a synonym of Myosotis australis by van Royen and Riedel, and is treated as a subspecies of M. australis in the latest taxonomic treatment.

The original specimens of this species were collected by missionary, linguist and botanist Christian Keysser. Keysser was one of the first Europeans to explore the Saruwaged Range whilst a missionary in New Guinea (1899-1920), and he made many important natural history collections in this area, sending them to botanical colleagues at the Herbarium Berolinense (B).

The possible holotype of M. saurwagedica was likely destroyed, along with many other herbarium specimens, during World War II. A neotype (BM 001252104) and an isoneotype (BM 001252013), collected by Keysser in the same mountains in 1913, were designated by Heidi Meudt and colleagues. They are lodged at the herbarium of the Natural History Museum.

This is one of two subspecies of M. australis recognized in the latest taxonomic treatment; the other is M. australis subsp. australis (native to Australia and New Zealand). (M. australis subsp. saruwagedica is endemic to New Guinea). The subspecies are allopatric and can be distinguished from one another using certain vegetative characters.

In the key to the two subspecies of M. australis, plants with hooked hairs on the underside of the uppermost cauline leaves, that have a rosette leaf blade usually oblanceolate to narrowly oblanceolate and with a length to width ratio usually greater than 4:1, and are often stoloniferous, key to M. australis subsp. saruwagedica. By contrast, plants lacking hooked hairs on the underside of the uppermost cauline leaves, that have a rosette leaf blade usually narrowly obovate to oblanceolate and with a length to width ratio usually less than 4:1, and lacking stolons, key to M. australis subsp. australis.

== Phylogeny ==
One individual of M. australis subsp. saruwagedica from New Guinea was included in a phylogenetic analyses of standard DNA sequencing markers (nuclear ribosomal DNA and chloroplast DNA regions). These same individual, plus several others of M. australis subsp. australis from New Zealand and Australia were included in a subsequent phylogeny.

In both studies, within the southern hemisphere lineage, the M. australis individuals were not monophyletic, but in general species relationships were not well resolved.

== Description ==
Myosotis australis subsp. saruwagedica plants are rosettes that are often stoloniferous. The rosette leaves have petioles that are 1–68 mm long. The rosette leaf blades are 6–739 mm long by 2–12 mm wide (length: width ratio 3.2–7.7: 1), usually narrowly oblanceolate, narrowly obovate to very broadly obovate, usually widest at or above the middle, usually with an acute apex. Both surfaces of the leaf are uniformly and densely covered in flexuous, patent to erect hairs oriented parallel or oblique to the midrib. On the upper surface of the leaf, these hairs are always antrorse (forward-facing) whereas on the lower surface, they are mostly antrorse but mixed with some retrorse hairs (backward-facing) near the tip and on the mid vein. Each rosette has 1–7 ascending to erect, usually branched, partially bracteate inflorescences that are not bifurcating at the top and are up to 630 mm long. The cauline leaves are similar to the rosette leaves, but become smaller, and have hairs similar to the rosette leaves but also with some hooked hairs on the underside of the uppermost cauline leaves. The flowers are 3–96 per inflorescence (rarely as many as 230), and each is borne on a short pedicel, with or without a bract. The calyx is 1–5 mm long at flowering and 2–7 mm long at fruiting, lobed to one-half to nearly all of its length, and densely covered in straight, flexuous or curved hairs, as well as some hooked hairs, all of which are mostly antrorse (with some retrorse or backward-facing hairs near the base). The longer calyx hairs are patent to erect whereas the shorter calyx hairs are appressed to patent. The corolla is white and 2–5 mm in diameter, with a cylindrical tube, petals that are usually broadly obovate to very broadly obovate, or ovate to very broadly ovate, and small white or yellow scales alternating with the petals. The anthers are partly exserted with the anther tips surpassing the faucal scales. The four smooth, shiny, usually medium to dark brown nutlets are 1.3–2.2 mm long by 0.6–1.7 mm wide and narrowly ovoid to broadly ovoid in shape.

The pollen of Myosotis australis subsp. saruwagedica is of the australis type.

The chromosome number of M. australis subsp. saruwagedica is unknown.

Flowering and fruiting throughout the year, with the main flowering and fruiting period April–August.

Very few images of plants of M. australis from New Guinea exist. A black and white photograph of a living plant taken by Pieter van Royen, and a botanical line drawing, can be seen in the Boraginaceae treatment for Flora Melanesia.

== Distribution and habitat ==
Myosotis australis subsp. saruwagedica is endemic to New Guinea. It is found in both Western New Guinea (in Mimina and Puncak Jaya) as well as Papua New Guinea, in the following districts: Highlands (Chiumbu, Eastern Highlands, Enga, Hela, Southern Highlands, Western Highlands & Jiwaka), Momase (Morobe, West Sepik), and Southern (Central, Milne Bay).

It can be found from 1775 to 4350 m ASL in alpine or subalpine meadows, grasslands or woodlands, on steep slopes and cliffs, in moist to boggy, shaded and sheltered areas.

This is the only species of Myosotis in New Guinea.

== Conservation status ==
Van Royen said M. australis was a "common species of the lower and upper mountain areas often reaches the alpine regions" in New Guinea. Although localities and other information on herbarium specimen labels can provide some information, up-to-date surveys to provide data on population size and the extent and quality of habitat is required before the conservations status of this species can be fully assessed. Because of this, it was suggested that "Data Deficient" is the most appropriate conservation category for this taxon when it is assessed against the IUCN criteria.
