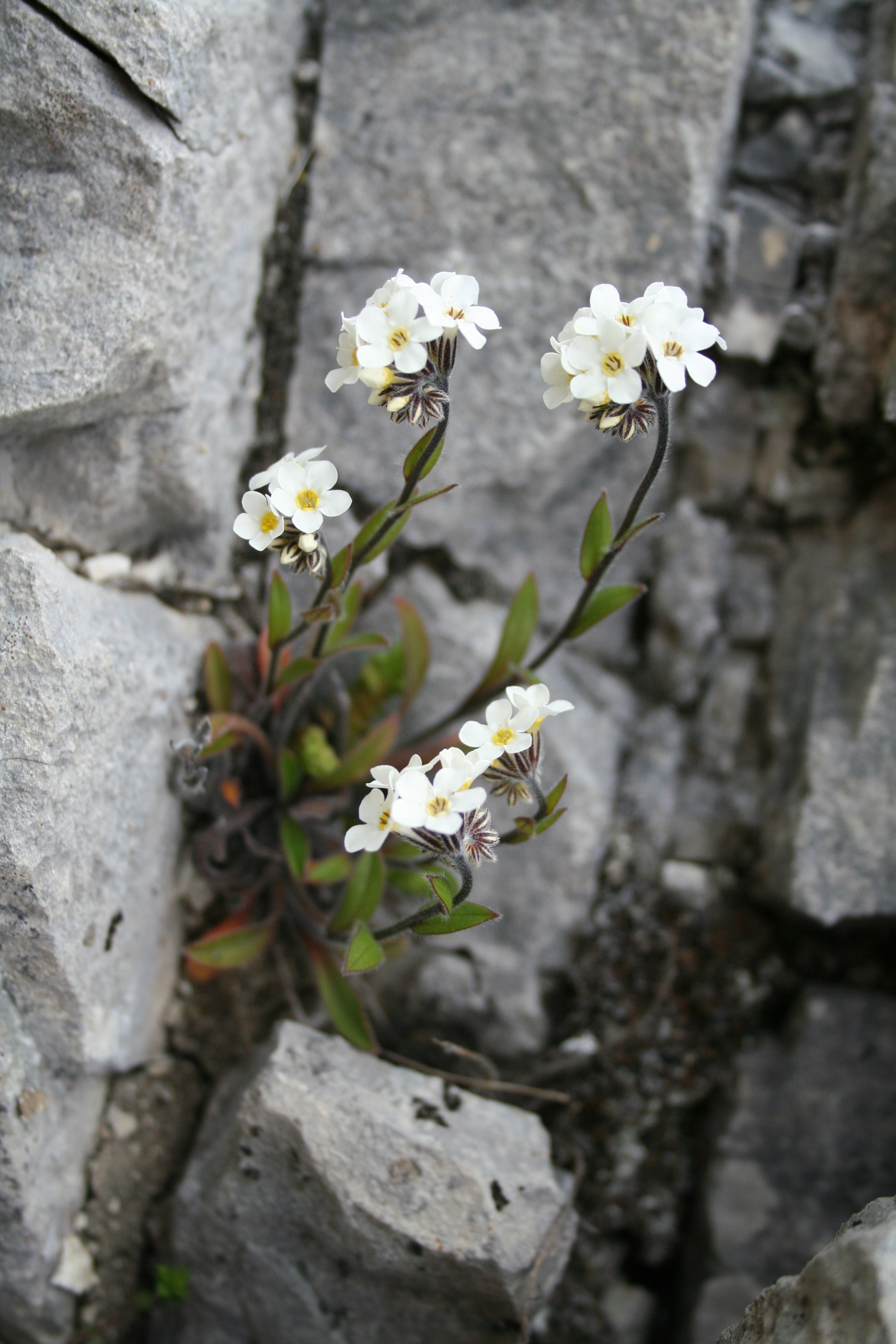
- Habit of Myosotis saxatilis

Conservation status
- Naturally Uncommon (NZ TCS)

Scientific classification
- Kingdom: Plantae
- Clade: Tracheophytes
- Clade: Angiosperms
- Clade: Eudicots
- Clade: Asterids
- Order: Boraginales
- Family: Boraginaceae
- Genus: Myosotis
- Species: M. saxatilis

Binomial name
- Myosotis saxatilis Petrie

= Myosotis saxatilis =

Species of flowering plant

Myosotis saxatilis is a species of flowering plant in the family Boraginaceae, endemic to New Zealand. Donald Petrie described this species in 1918. Plants of this species of forget-me-not are perennial rosettes with ebracteate inflorescences and white corollas with stamens that are fully included in the corolla tube or sometimes partly exserted.

M. saxatilis is found in the South Island of New Zealand in the regions of Marlborough, Westland, and Otago. It is listed by the New Zealand Threat Classification System as Naturally Uncommon. There is some evidence of hybridisation among other related species.

== Description ==
M. saxatilis plants are rosettes that are not stoloniferous. The rosette leaves have petioles that are 6–31 mm long. The rosette leaf blades are 7–53 mm long by 2–15 mm wide (length: width ratio 1.6–5.2: 1), usually oblanceolate, obovate or narrowly obovate, usually widest at or above the middle, usually with an obtuse apex. Both surfaces of the leaf are uniformly and densely covered in flexuous, patent to erect, hairs oriented parallel or oblique to the midrib, and densely distributed. On the upper surface of the leaf, these hairs are antrorse (forward-facing) whereas on the lower surface, they are mostly retrorse (backward-facing).

Each rosette has 1–9 ascending, branched or unbranched, ebracteate inflorescences that are bifurcating at the top and up to 285 mm long. The cauline leaves are similar to the rosette leaves, but become smaller.

The flowers are 8–73 per inflorescence and each is borne on a short pedicel without a bract. The calyx is 2–5 mm long at flowering and 4–6 mm long at fruiting, lobed to two-thirds to nearly all of its length, and densely covered in straight, flexuous or curved hairs, as well as some hooked hairs, all of which are mostly antrorse (with some retrorse or backward-facing hairs near the base). The longer calyx hairs are patent to erect whereas the shorter calyx hairs are appressed to patent. The corolla is white and 3–9 mm in diameter, with a cylindrical tube, petals that are usually broadly obovate to very broadly obovate, and small yellow scales alternating with the petals. The anthers are usually fully included or sometimes partly exserted. The four smooth, shiny, usually medium to dark brown nutlets are 1.7–2.3 mm long by 1.5–2.2 mm wide and narrowly ovoid to ovoid in shape.

The pollen of M.saxatilis is of the australis, uniflora, discolor and intermediate types.

The chromosome number of M. saxatilis is unknown.

Flowering and fruiting between November–May, with the main flowering period from November–February.

== Gallery ==
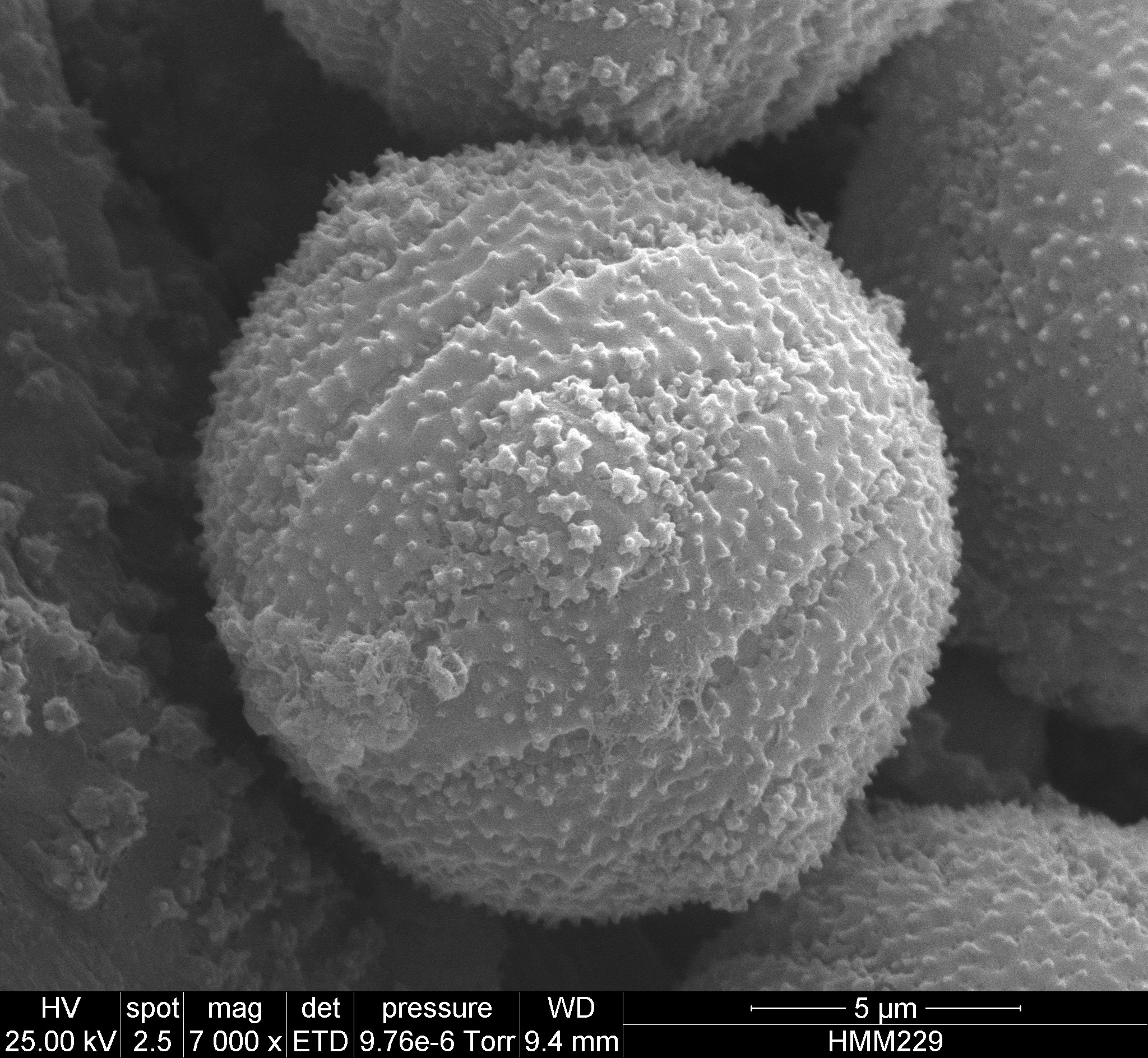
Pollen

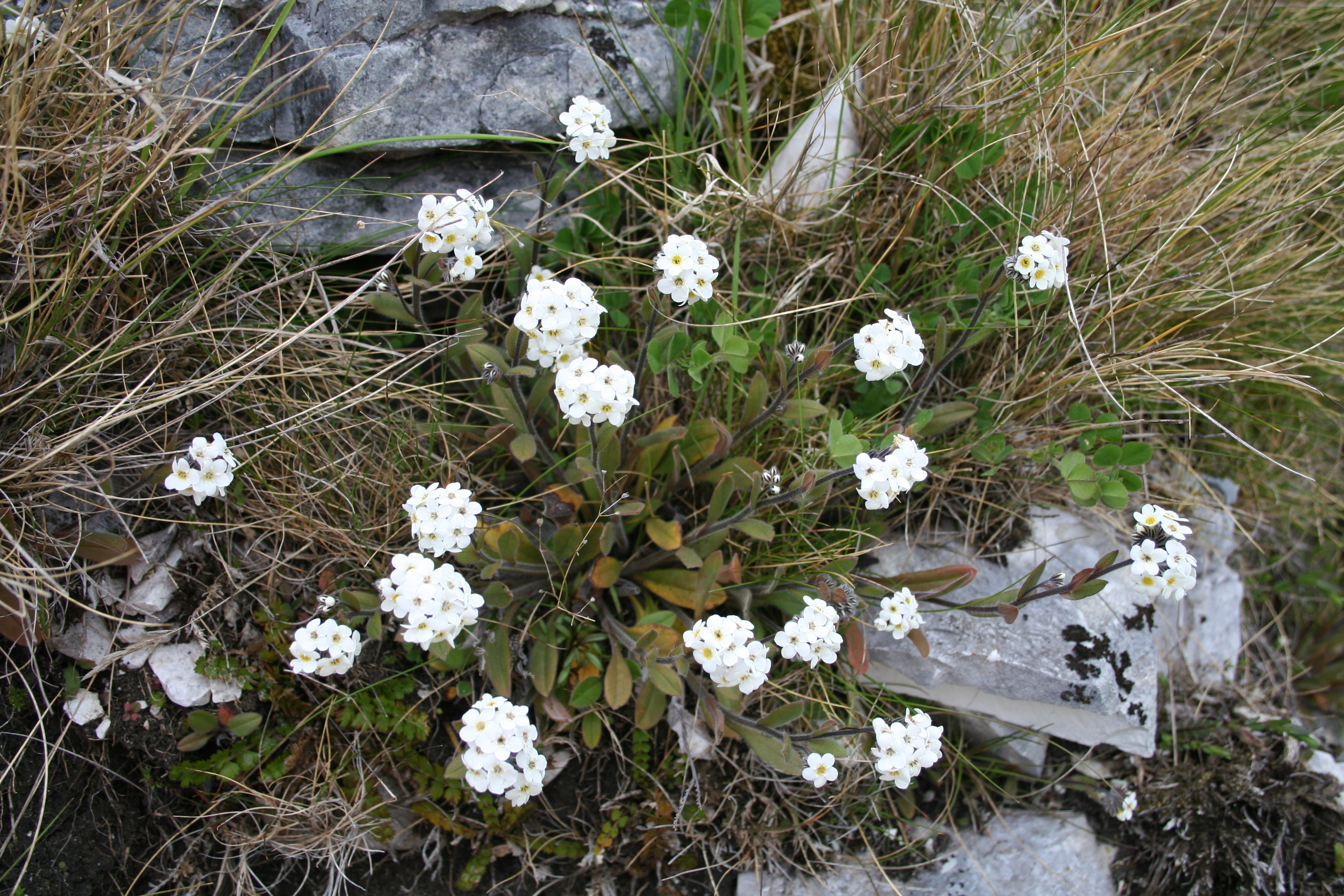
Flowering habit in rocky grassland habitat

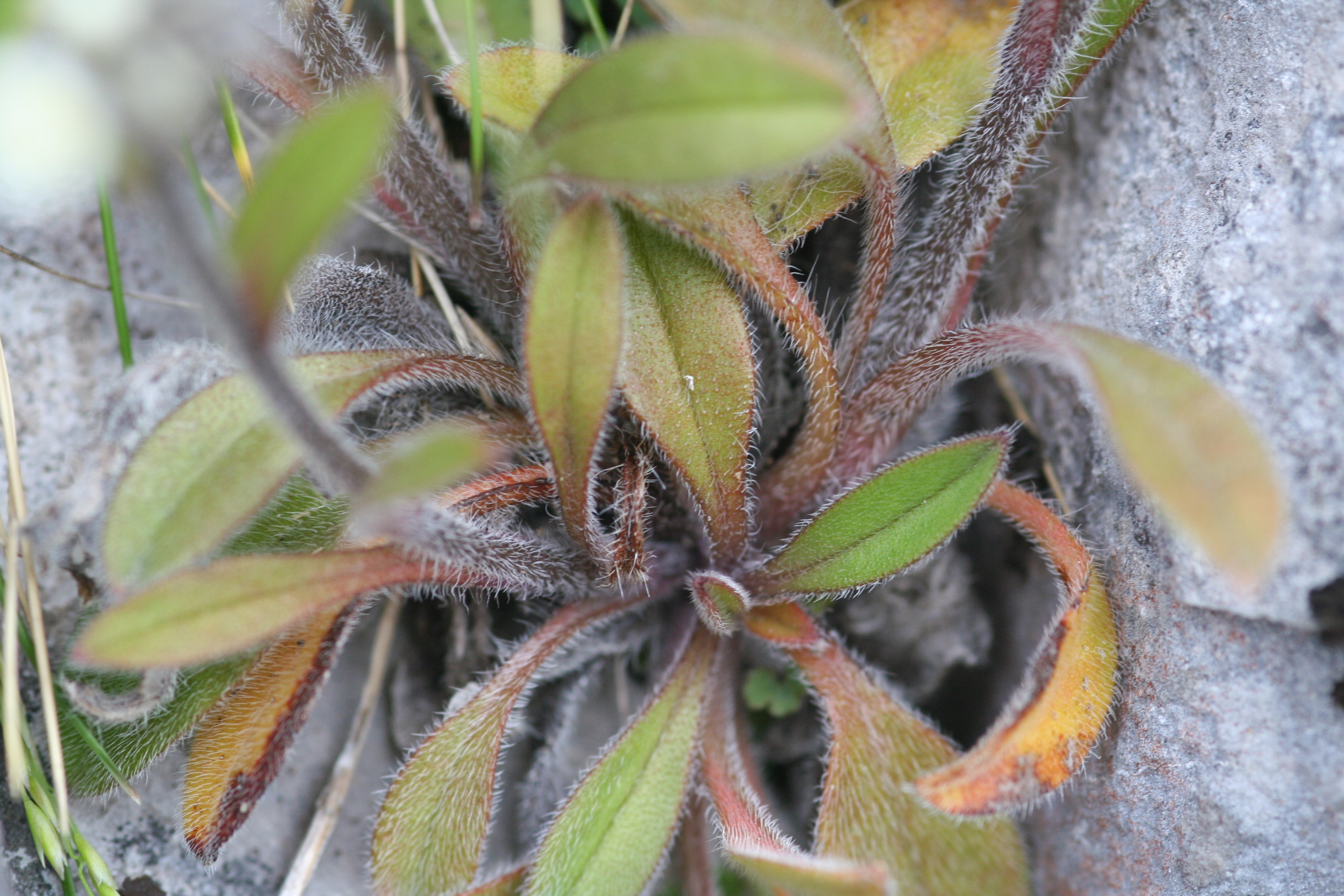
Close-up of rosette leaves

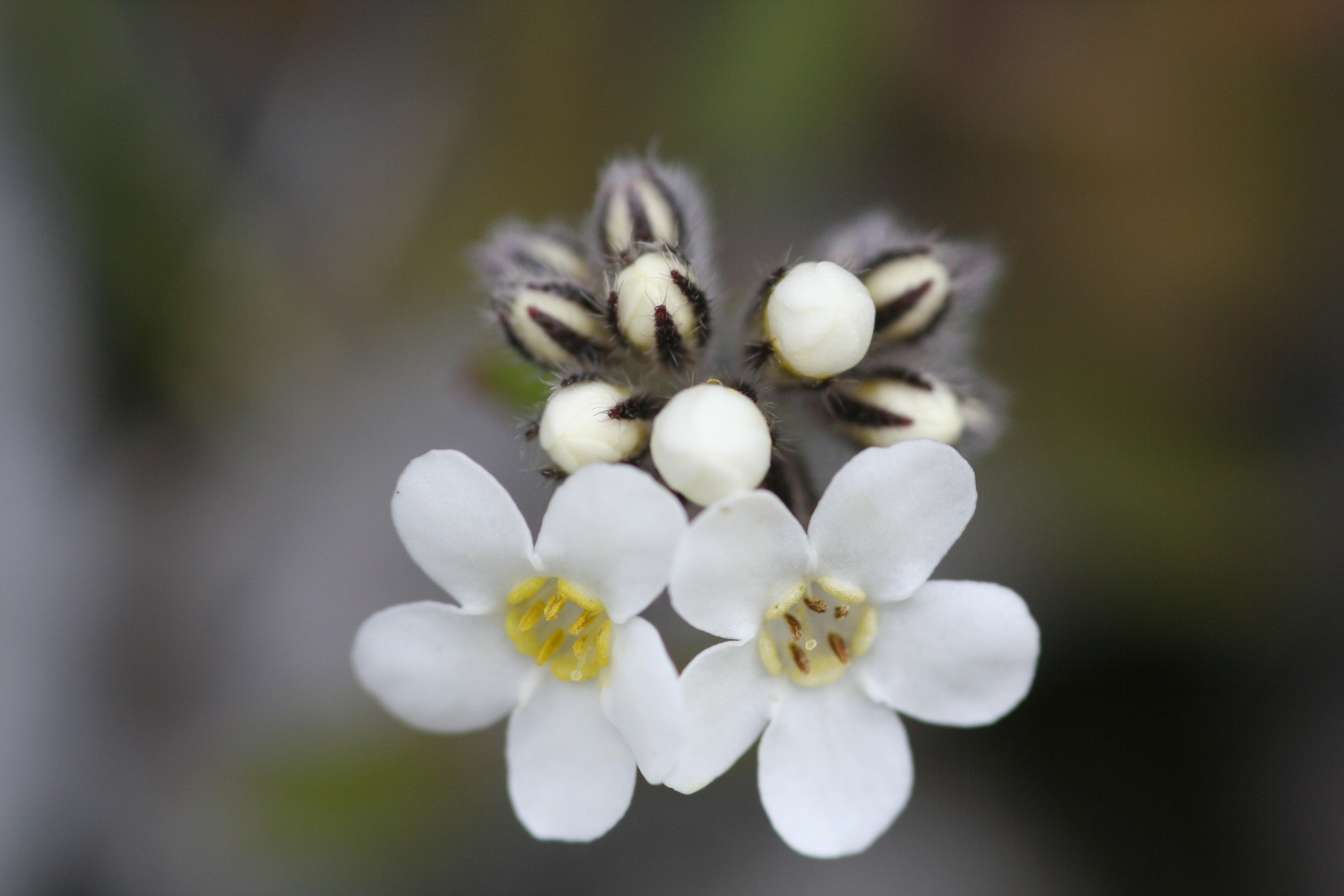
Close-up of flowers and buds

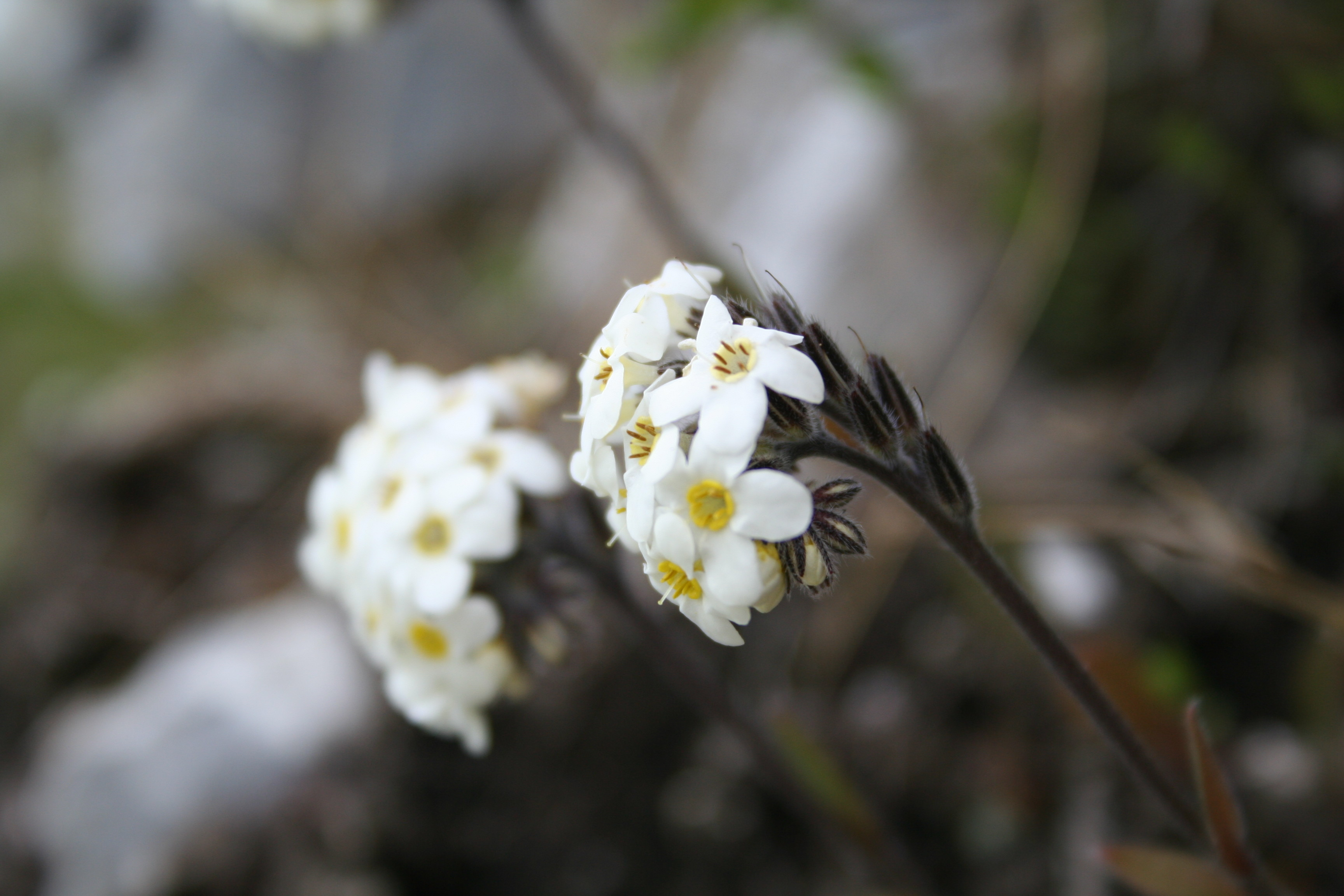
Flowering inflorescences

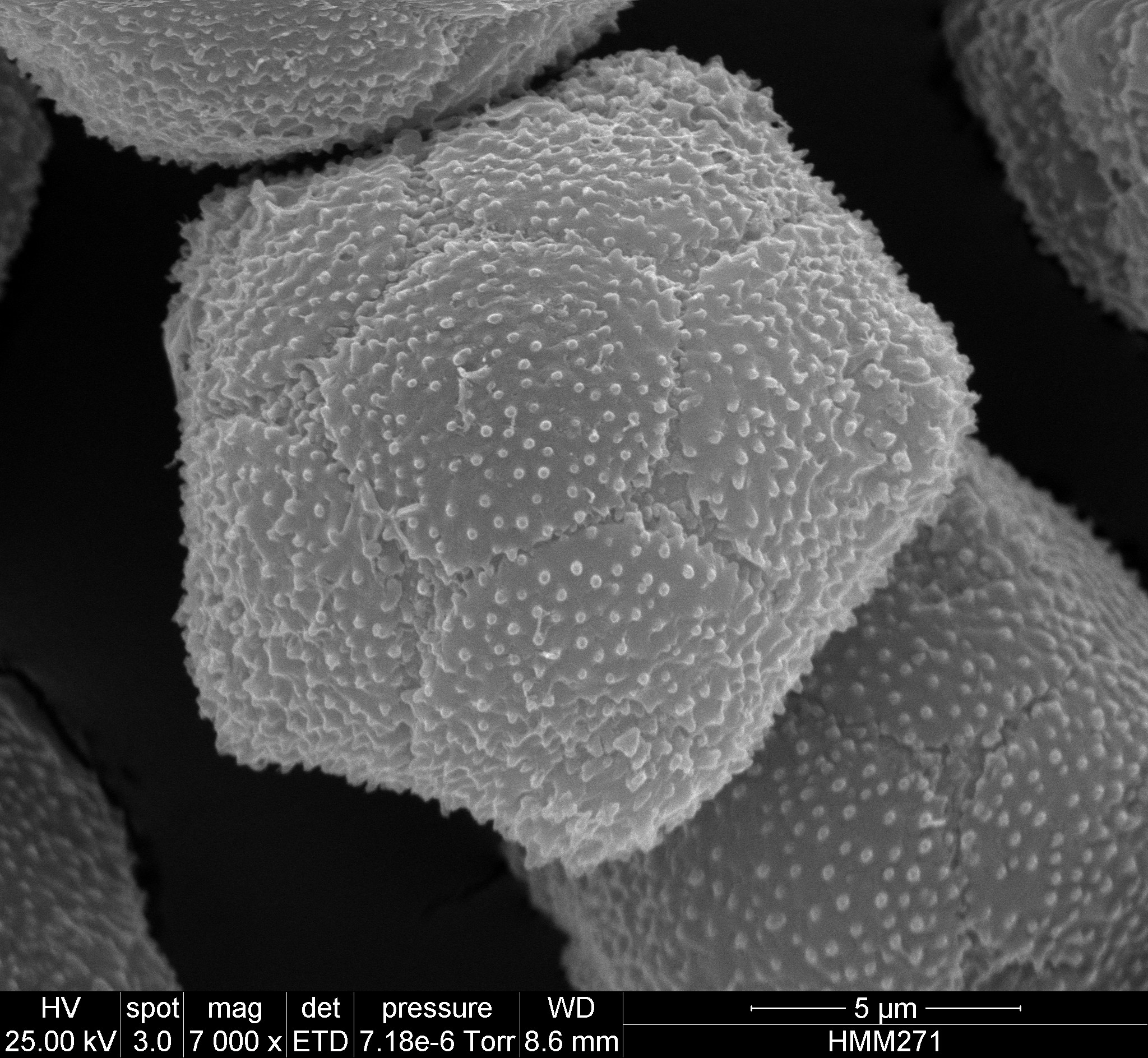
Pollen

== Taxonomy and etymology ==
Myosotis saxatilis Petrie is in the plant family Boraginaceae. The species was originally described by Donald Petrie in 1918. The lectotype was collected by Leonard Cockayne in the Shingly Range, Marlborough, South Island, is lodged at the herbarium of the Museum of New Zealand Te Papa Tongarewa (WELT SP002612), and was designated by Lucy Moore.

Myosotis saxatilis is morphologically most similar to other ebracteate-erect species from New Zealand, especially M. australis. Several morphological characters can be used to distinguish M. saxatilis from M. australis. The obviously bifurcating, ebracteate inflorescence of M. saxatilis can help distinguish it from the partially bracteate, distally non-bifurcating inflorescence in M. australis. In addition, M. saxatilis has short internodes between fruits at fruiting (<12 mm) whereas M. australis has long internodes (>10 mm).

The species epithet saxatilis means 'dwelling among rocks' and is based on the Latin word for rock, saxum. There is an earlier name, Myosotis saxatilis Pall., from the northern hemisphere. This name is not validly published as it is a nomen nudum and thus not validly published.

=== Phylogeny ===
Two individuals of Myosotis saxatilis (WELT SP089760, WELT SP089880; as 'M. aff. australis') were included in phylogenetic analyses of standard DNA sequencing markers (nuclear ribosomal DNA and chloroplast DNA regions). Within the southern hemisphere lineage, species relationships were not well resolved.

=== Hybridisation ===
On the basis of morphological data, Myosotis saxatilis may hybridise with M. colensoi in Marlborough. At least two specimens (WELT SP090554 and WELT SP090557) have been identified as interspecific M. saxatilis × M. colensoi hybrids.

== Distribution and habitat ==
Myosotis saxatilis is endemic to New Zealand in Marlborough, Westland and Otago from 385 to 1560 (rarely up to 1830) m ASL, on rocks, bluffs, outcrops, ledges, scree, or banks.

== Conservation status ==
Myosotis saxatilis was listed, as the taxonomically indeterminate 'Myosotis aff. australis (d) (WELT SP002612; “saxatilis Petrie”)', as At Risk - Naturally Uncommon, with the qualifiers DP ("Data Poor") and Sp ("Sparse"), on the most recent assessment (2017-2018) under the New Zealand Threatened Classification system for plants.
