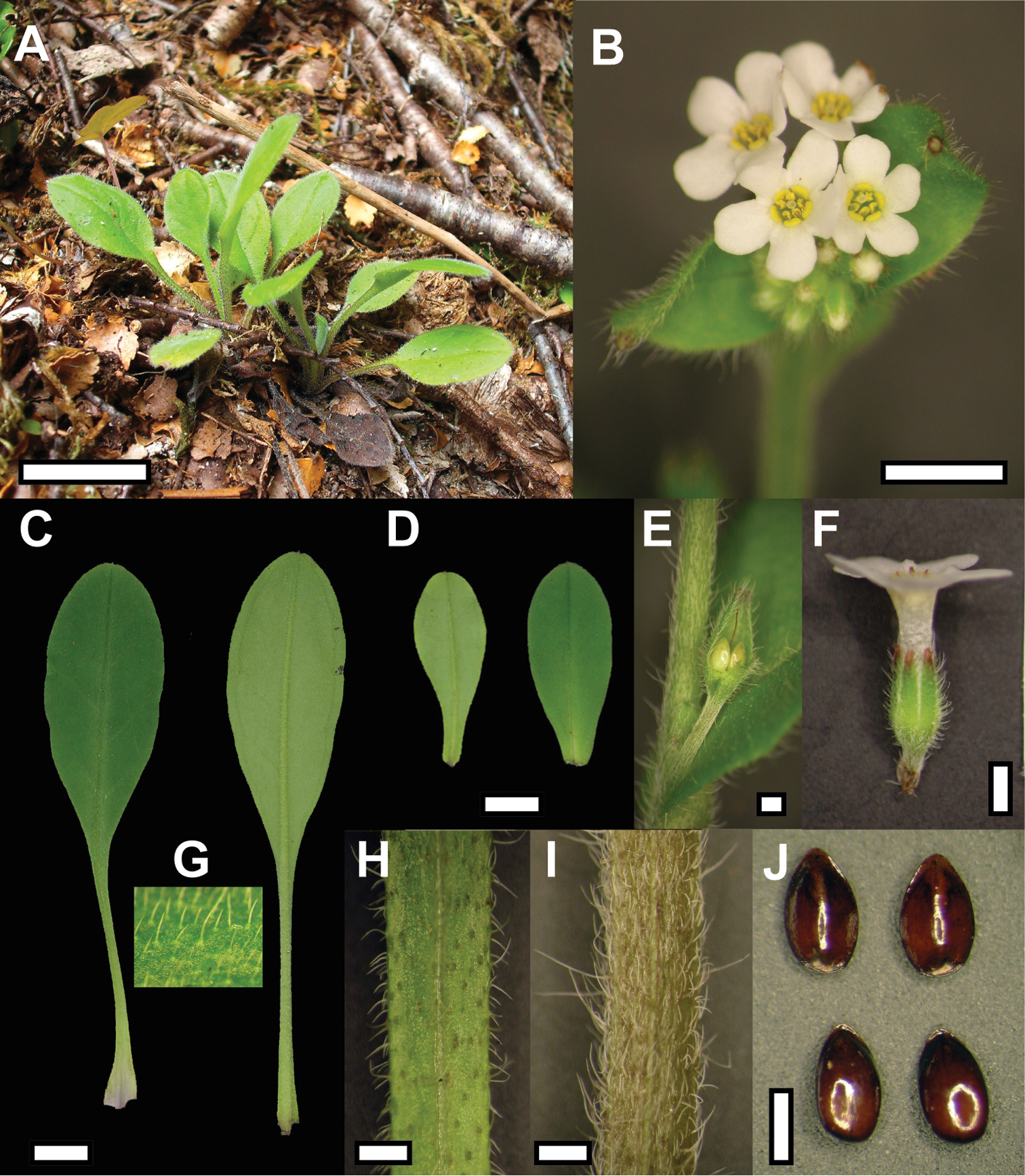

Scientific classification
- Kingdom: Plantae
- Clade: Tracheophytes
- Clade: Angiosperms
- Clade: Eudicots
- Clade: Asterids
- Order: Boraginales
- Family: Boraginaceae
- Genus: Myosotis
- Species: M. mooreana

Binomial name
- Myosotis mooreana Lehnebach

= Myosotis mooreana =

Species of flowering plant

Myosotis mooreana is a species of flowering plant in the family Boraginaceae, described as being endemic to the South Island of New Zealand by Carlos Lehnebach in 2012, and synonymised with Myosotis australis in 2020. Plants of this species of forget-me-not are perennial rosettes with ebracteate inflorescences and white or yellow corollas with stamens that are fully included in the corolla tube or sometimes partly exserted.

== Taxonomy and etymology ==
Myosotis mooreana Lehenbach is in the plant family Boraginaceae. It was described by Carlos Lehenbach in 2012, and is a synonym of Myosotis australis, a species of forget-me-not native to New Zealand, Australia and New Guinea.

The holotype of M. mooreana was collected in Kahurangi National Park near the Cobb Reservoir in 2011 by C.A. Lehnebach and A. Zeller, and is housed at the herbarium of the Museum of New Zealand Te Papa Tongarewa (WELT SP092756/A).

The species epithet mooreana honours New Zealand botanist Lucy B. Moore, who worked on New Zealand Myosotis and wrote the treatment of the genus for the Flora of New Zealand.

According to the latest taxonomic treatment, the following names are all synonyms of Myosotis australis: M. mooreana Lehnebach, M. lytteltonensis (Laing & A.Wall) de Lange (and M. australis var. lytteltonensis Laing & A.Wall;), and M. australis var. conspicua Cheeseman.

== Phylogeny ==
The holotype of Myosotis mooreana was included in a phylogenetic analysis of standard DNA sequencing markers (nuclear ribosomal DNA and chloroplast DNA regions). In the nuclear ribosomal DNA network, it was close to M. chaffeyorum and other individuals from the same geographical area, but the same pattern was not seen in the chloroplast DNA network. In general, within the southern hemisphere lineage, species relationships were not well resolved in that study.

== Distribution and habitat ==
At the time of its description, M. mooreana was only known from the type locality and thought to be endemic to Kahurangi National Park, Western Nelson, in the northern South Island.

== Conservation status ==
Myosotis mooreana was listed as Threatened - Nationally Critical on the most recent assessment (2017–2018) under the New Zealand Threat Classification system for plants, with the qualifiers "DP" (Data Poor), "OL" (One Location) and "Sp" (Sparse). M. australis was listed as Not Threatened in the same assessment.
