= Agkistrodon nepa =

Agkistrodon nepa is a taxonomic synonym that may refer to:

- Hypnale nepa, a.k.a. Sri Lankan hump-nosed viper, venomous pitviper found in Sri Lanka
- Hypnale walli, a.k.a. Wall's hump-nosed viper, venomous pitviper found in Sri Lanka
