= Ancistrodon hypnale =

Hypnale walli is a taxonomic synonym that may refer to:

- Hypnale hypnale, a.k.a. Merrem's hump-nosed viper, venomous pitviper found in Sri Lanka and southwestern India
- Hypnale walli, a.k.a. Wall's hump-nosed viper, venomous pitviper found in Sri Lanka
