= Ancistrodon nepa =

Ancistrodon nepa (a taxonomic synonym) may refer to:

- Hypnale nepa, a.k.a. Sri Lankan hump-nosed viper, venomous pitviper found in Sri Lanka
- Hypnale walli, a.k.a. Wall's hump-nosed viper, venomous pitviper found in Sri Lanka
