= Ancistrodon millardi =

Ancistrodon millardi is a taxonomic synonym that may refer to:

- Hypnale hypnale or Merrem's hump-nosed viper, a venomous pit viper found in Sri Lanka and southwestern India
- Hypnale walli or Wall's hump-nosed viper, a venomous pit viper found in Sri Lanka
