= Hump-nosed pit viper =

Hump-nosed pit viper or Hump-nosed viper may refer to:

- Hypnale (in general), any member of a genus of venomous pitvipers found in Sri Lanka and southwestern India.
- Hypnale hypnale (in particular), a venomous pitviper species found in India and Sri Lanka.
