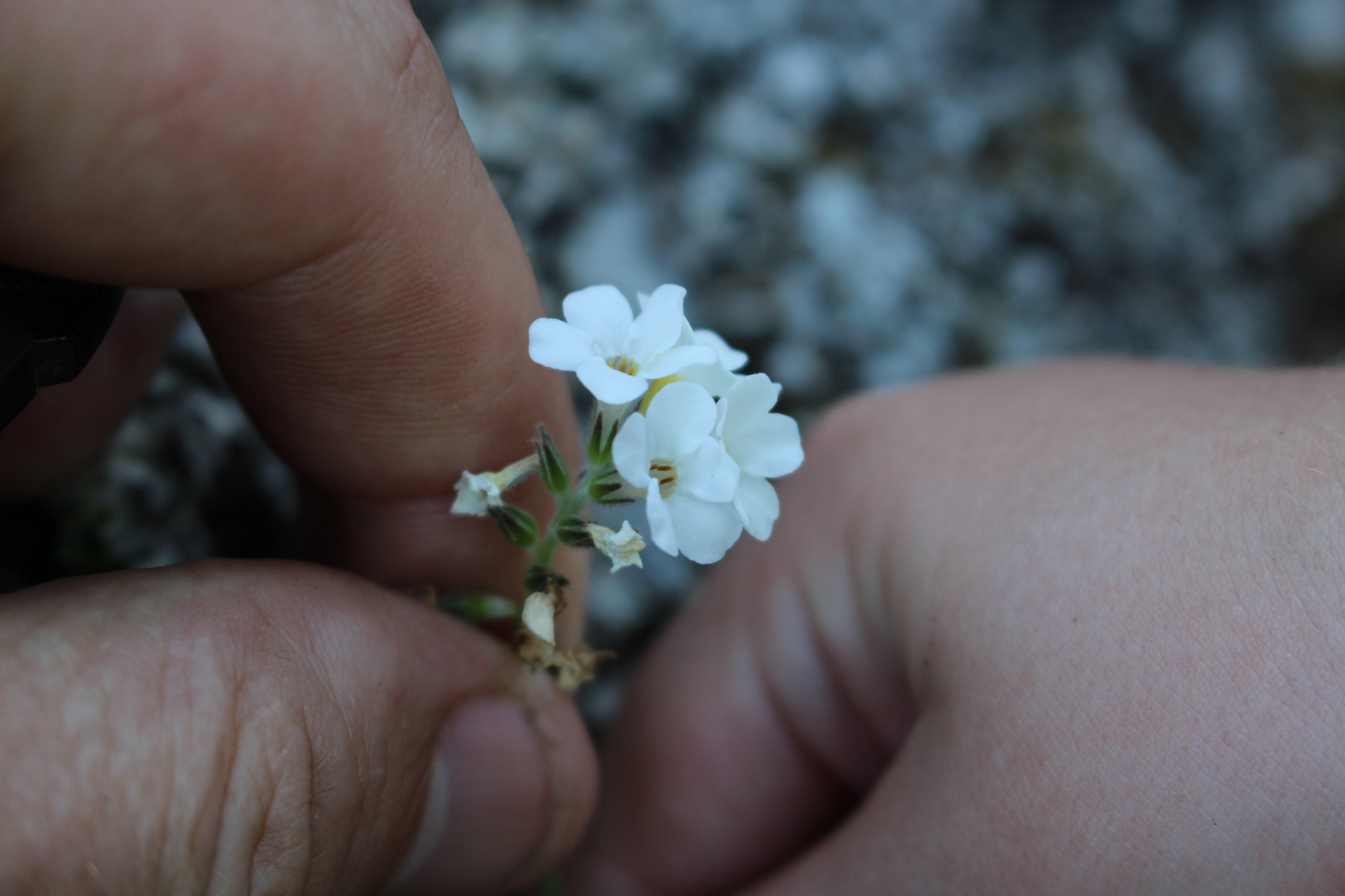

Scientific classification
- Kingdom: Plantae
- Clade: Tracheophytes
- Clade: Angiosperms
- Clade: Eudicots
- Clade: Asterids
- Order: Boraginales
- Family: Boraginaceae
- Genus: Myosotis
- Species: M. lytteltonensis

Binomial name
- Myosotis lytteltonensis (Laing & A.Wall) de Lange

= Myosotis lytteltonensis =

Species of flowering plant

Myosotis lytteltonensis is a species of flowering plant in the family Boraginaceae and a synonym of Myosotis australis. It was first described as a variety of M. australis, considered endemic to the South Island of New Zealand, then raised to species status, and subsequently synonymised with Myosotis australis in 2020. Plants of this species of forget-me-not are perennial rosettes with ebracteate inflorescences and white or yellow corollas with stamens that are fully included in the corolla tube or sometimes partly exserted.

== Taxonomy and etymology ==
Myosotis lytteltonensis (Laing & A.Wall) de Lange or Lyttelton forget-me-not is in the plant family Boraginaceae. It was originally described in 1924 as a variety of Myosotis australis (as M. australis var. lytteltonensis Laing & A.Wall) by Robert Malcolm Laing and Arnold Wall, thought to be restricted to Banks Peninsula, Canterbury, New Zealand. It was raised to species status by Peter de Lange in 2010. In the latest taxonomic treatment, it was considered to be a synonym of Myosotis australis, a species of forget-me-not native to New Zealand, Australia and New Guinea, due to a lack of distinguishing morphological characters.

The lectotype of M. australis var. lytteltonensis was collected in Lyttelton in 1917 by Robert M. Laing and is housed at the Allan Herbarium of Manaaki Whenua - Landcare Research in Lincoln (CHR 17637). It was designated by Lucy B. Moore, and there is also an isolectotype at the same institution (CHR 17636).

The species epithet lytteltonensis refers to the type locality, Lyttelton, Canterbury, New Zealand.

According to the latest taxonomic treatment, the following names are all synonyms of Myosotis australis: M. mooreana Lehnebach, M. lytteltonensis (Laing & A.Wall) de Lange (and M. australis var. lytteltonensis Laing & A.Wall;), and M. australis var. conspicua Cheeseman.

== Breeding system ==
Flowers of Myosotis lytteltonensis were found to be 'initially herkogamous' in a study on the breeding system of six different species of New Zealand Myosotis.

== Phylogeny ==
One individual of Myosotis lytteltonensis was included in a phylogenetic analysis of standard DNA sequencing markers (nuclear ribosomal DNA and chloroplast DNA regions). In the chloroplast DNA network, the sample of M. lytteltonensis was close to M. goyenii and M. australis, but its relationships in the nuclear ribosomal DNA network were less clear. In general, within the southern hemisphere lineage, species relationships were not well resolved in that study.

== Distribution and habitat ==
Prior to its synonymy with Myosotis australis, M. lytteltonensis was thought to be endemic to Banks Peninsula, Canterbury, South Island, although some specimens from Marlborough (South Island) and southern North Island have also been identified as M. lytteltonensis.

== Conservation status ==
Myosotis lytteltonensis was listed as Threatened - Nationally Critical on the most recent assessment (2017–2018) under the New Zealand Threat Classification system for plants, with the qualifiers "RR" (Range Restricted) and "Sp" (Sparse). M. australis was listed as Not Threatened in the same assessment.
