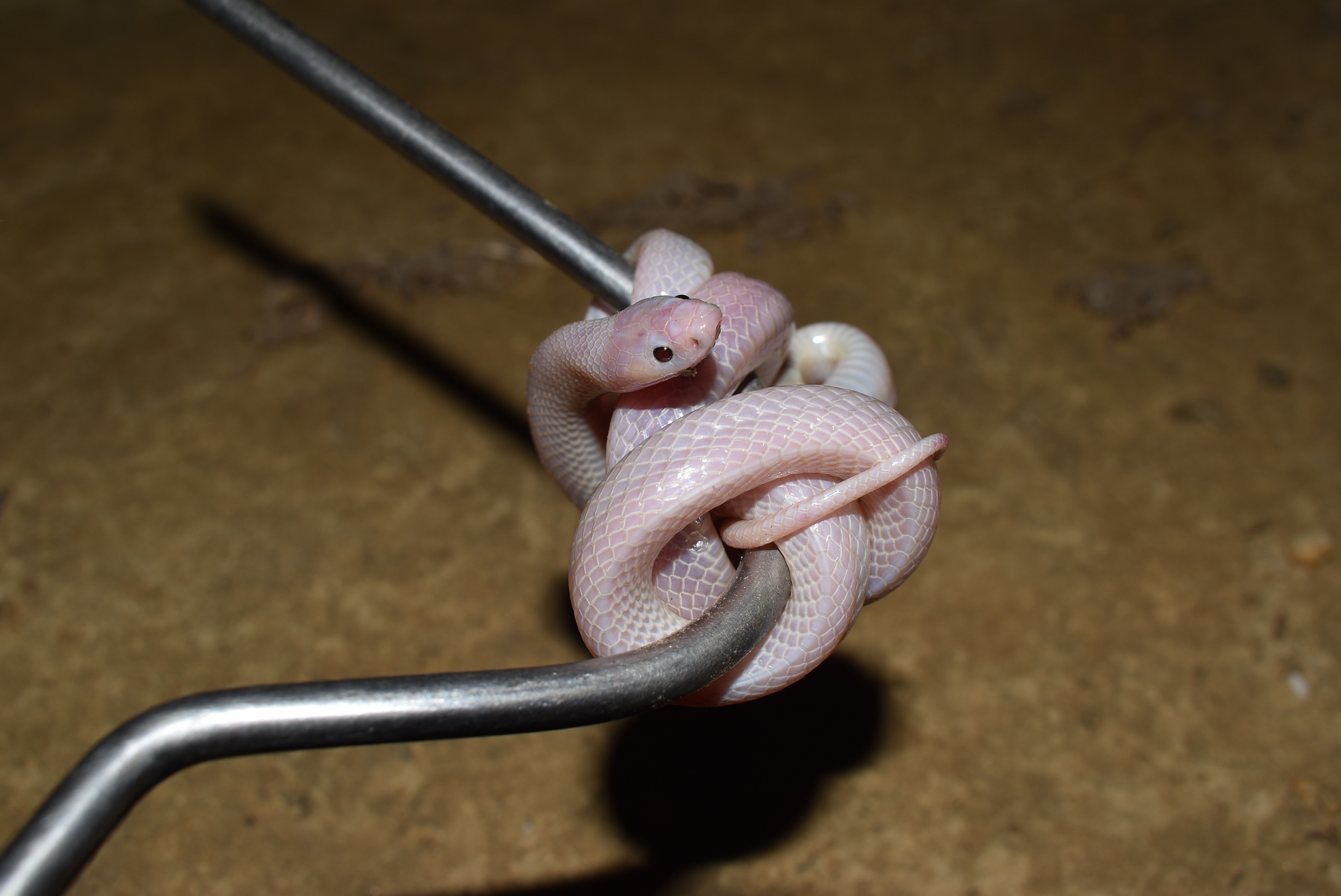

Conservation status
- Least Concern (IUCN 3.1)

Scientific classification
- Kingdom: Animalia
- Phylum: Chordata
- Class: Reptilia
- Order: Squamata
- Suborder: Serpentes
- Family: Elapidae
- Genus: Bungarus
- Species: B. walli

Binomial name
- Bungarus walli Wall, 1907
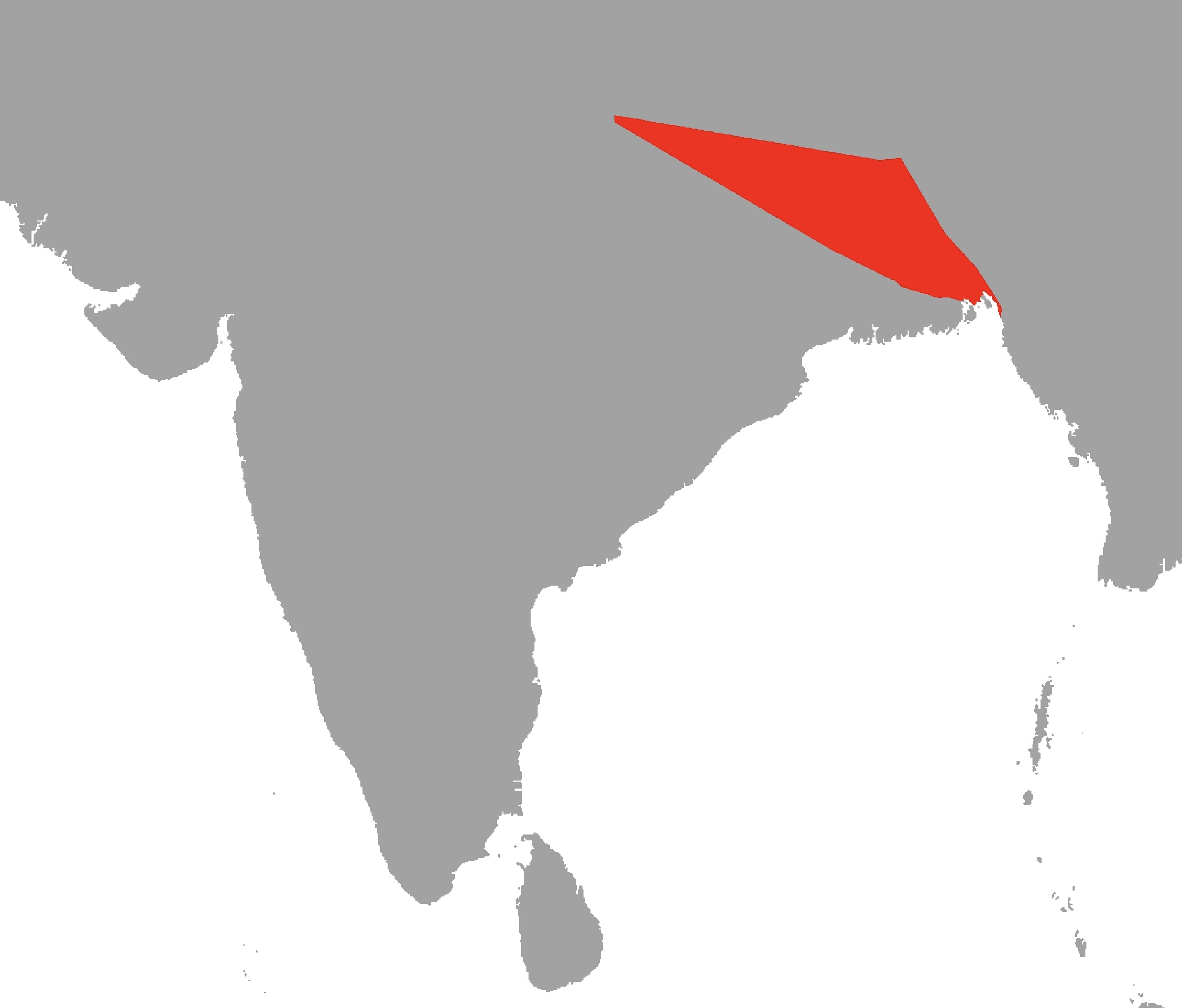

Synonyms
- Bungarus sindanus walli Wall, 1907

= Bungarus walli =

Species of snake

Bungarus walli, the Wall's krait, (Note: Bungarus walli doesn not occur in Sindh (Pakistan). This common name apparently carries over from the period when this taxon was part of Bungarus sindanus.) is a species of krait, a venomous elapid snake found in northern India, Bangladesh, Nepal, and Bhutan. It has previously been treated as a subspecies of Bungarus sindanus (also known as the Sind krait), but is now considered a valid species.

== Etymology ==
This taxon is named in honour of British herpetologist Frank Wall, who named the taxon after himself, admitting that it was a "breach of ethics" to do so.

== Habitat ==
Bungarus walli occurs in forests, agricultural fields, and rural and urbanized areas. It is locally common.
