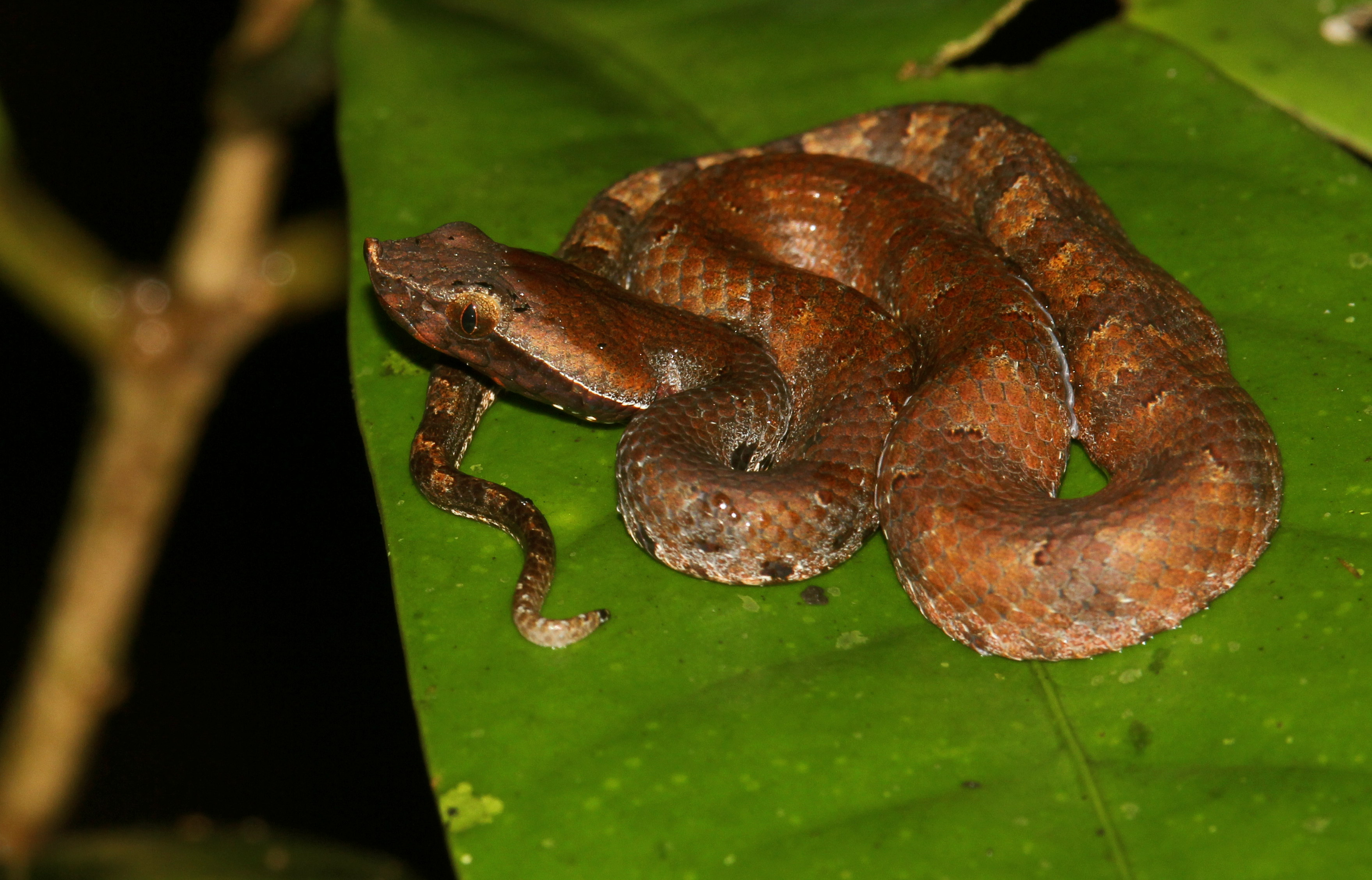

Conservation status
- Near Threatened (IUCN 3.1)

Scientific classification
- Domain: Eukaryota
- Kingdom: Animalia
- Phylum: Chordata
- Class: Reptilia
- Order: Squamata
- Suborder: Serpentes
- Family: Viperidae
- Genus: Hypnale
- Species: H. zara

Binomial name
- Hypnale zara Gray, 1849

Synonyms
- Trigonocephalus zara – Gray, 1849 (part); Hypnale zara – Maduwage et al., 2009.

= Hypnale zara =

Species of snake

Hypnale zara, the lowlands hump-nosed pit viper, is a venomous pit viper species endemic to Sri Lanka. It is distinguished from Hypnale nepa by variably colored body and less upcurved snout. No subspecies are currently recognized.

== Description ==
Hypnale zara has 10–19 minute scales extending from wart-like protuberances on the snout tip. Additionally, there are 18–39 heterogeneous small scales in the internasal to prefrontal regions, along with six scales around the eye and seven to eight supralabials. The costal scales are keeled, and there are 134–157 ventrals. Subcaudals may range from 34 to 51.

Dorsum color ranges from yellowish brown to dark brown, sometimes deep red. Two rows of distinct sub-oval or sub-triangular blotches meet in the vertebral region. There is a dark stripe across the eye and cheek. Venter is lighter than dorsum, sometimes light ash-gray.

== Reproduction ==
Hypnale zara is ovoviviparous.
