= Edward Seymour, 16th Duke of Somerset =

British peer and soldier

- Duke of Somerset
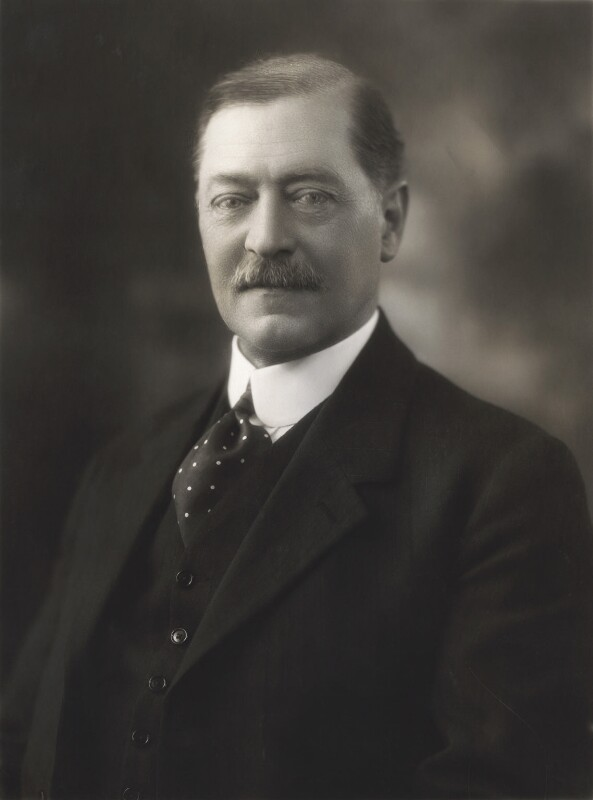
- Seymour in 1925

- Coat of arms
- Tenure: 1923–1931
- Predecessor: Algernon St Maur, 15th Duke of Somerset
- Successor: Evelyn Seymour, 17th Duke of Somerset
- Born: 12 May 1860
- Died: 5 May 1931 (aged 70)
- Spouse: Rowena Wall (m. 1881)
- Issue: Evelyn Seymour
- Father: Reverend Francis Payne Seymour
- Mother: Jane Margaret Dallas

Brigadier-General Edward Hamilton Seymour, 16th Duke of Somerset, KBE, CB, CMG (12 May 1860 – 5 May 1931) was the son of Reverend Francis Payne Seymour and Jane Margaret Dallas. His father was the great-grandson of Lord Francis Seymour. He was also a baronet.

== Biography ==
=== Education and career ===
Seymour was educated at Blundell's School and the Royal Military College, Sandhurst, and joined the Dublin Fusiliers in 1880.

Seymour transferred to the Army Ordnance Department in 1896, and was promoted to major (ordnance officer, 3rd class) on 7 April 1898. In 1900 he served at the Royal Army Clothing Depot, with the temporary rank of lieutenant-colonel (ordnance officer, 2nd class) from 4 January 1900. Within the Army Ordnance Department he rose through the ranks of Assistant Director of Equipment and Ordnance Stores from 1909-14, before being promoted to Deputy Director in 1914 and later Inspector in 1918. In 1919 he was made a Knight Commander of the Order of the British Empire. He retired from the army in 1920.

=== Personal life and family ===
On 28 July 1881, Seymour married Rowena Wall, a daughter of George Wall, of Colombo, Ceylon. Together, they had one son:

- Evelyn Francis Edward Seymour (1 May 1882 - 26 April 1954), who married Edith Mary Parker, only child of William Parker of Whittington Hall, on 3 January 1906.

Rowena, Duchess of Somerset died on 13 November 1950.

=== Duke of Somerset ===
Following the death of Seymour's childless third-cousin-once-removed Algernon Seymour, 15th Duke of Somerset in 1923, Seymour was understood to be the likely successor to the Dukedom of Somerset; he was the great-great-grandson of the Very Reverend Lord Francis Seymour, fourth and youngest son of the 8th Duke. Sir Edward petitioned the House of Lords' Committee of Privileges in 1924 to be recognised as the successor to the Dukedom; who ruled in his favour on 25 March 1925. Part of his claim required him to prove that his great-grandparents Col. Francis Compton Seymour and Leonora Hudson had been lawfully married before the birth of his grandfather Francis Edward Seymour on 21 September 1788. His claim was disputed by his sixth-cousin, George Seymour, 7th Marquess of Hertford, who sought to prove that Leonora Hudson's first husband John had not died in 1786, and was still living at the time of her second marriage. The committee, presided over by Richard Hely-Hutchinson, 6th Earl of Donoughmore, found that there was insufficient evidence to support Lord Hertford's claim; their unanimous finding was delivered by John Hamilton, 1st Viscount Sumner.

Following his recognition as the rightful claimant to the Dukedom, Somerset and his wife took up residence at the ancestral seat of the Dukes of Somerset, Maiden Bradley House, Wiltshire, which the 15th Duke had bequeathed to his successor in his will. Although his predecessor had left an estate of £685,000, some £250,000 in estate taxes had been levied on the 15th Duke's estate. The 15th Duke had also bequeathed his widow a life annuity of £4,000 (after tax) which his successor was required to pay from the family estates.

=== Death and Estate ===
Somerset died on 5 May 1931 and was succeeded by his son Evelyn as 17th Duke of Somerset. His personal estate was valued at £19,895; a further grant of probate for £230,660 with respect to settled land held in trust under the will of the 15th Duke of Somerset was issued in January 1932.

== Ancestry ==
Ancestors of Edward Seymour, 16th Duke of Somerset

Lord Francis Seymour, fourth son of the 8th Duke of Somerset
Colonel Francis Compton Seymour
Catherine Payne
Captain Francis Edward Seymour RN
George Perkins
Leonora Perkins
Reverend Francis Payne Seymour
Charles Cooke
Elizabeth Cooke
Edward Seymour, 16th Duke of Somerset
Robert Dallas
Robert Charles Dallas
Sarah Elizabeth Cormack
Reverend Alexander Robert Charles Dallas
Thomas Harding
Sarah Harding
Jane Margaret Dallas
Robert Ferguson
Robert Ferguson
Mary Anne Ferguson

== Sources ==
- Obituary of the Duke of Somerset, The Times dated 22 October 1923 (p. 14; Issue 43478; col D)

Peerage of England
| Preceded by Algernon Seymour | Duke of Somerset; 1923–1931 | Succeeded by Evelyn Seymour |
