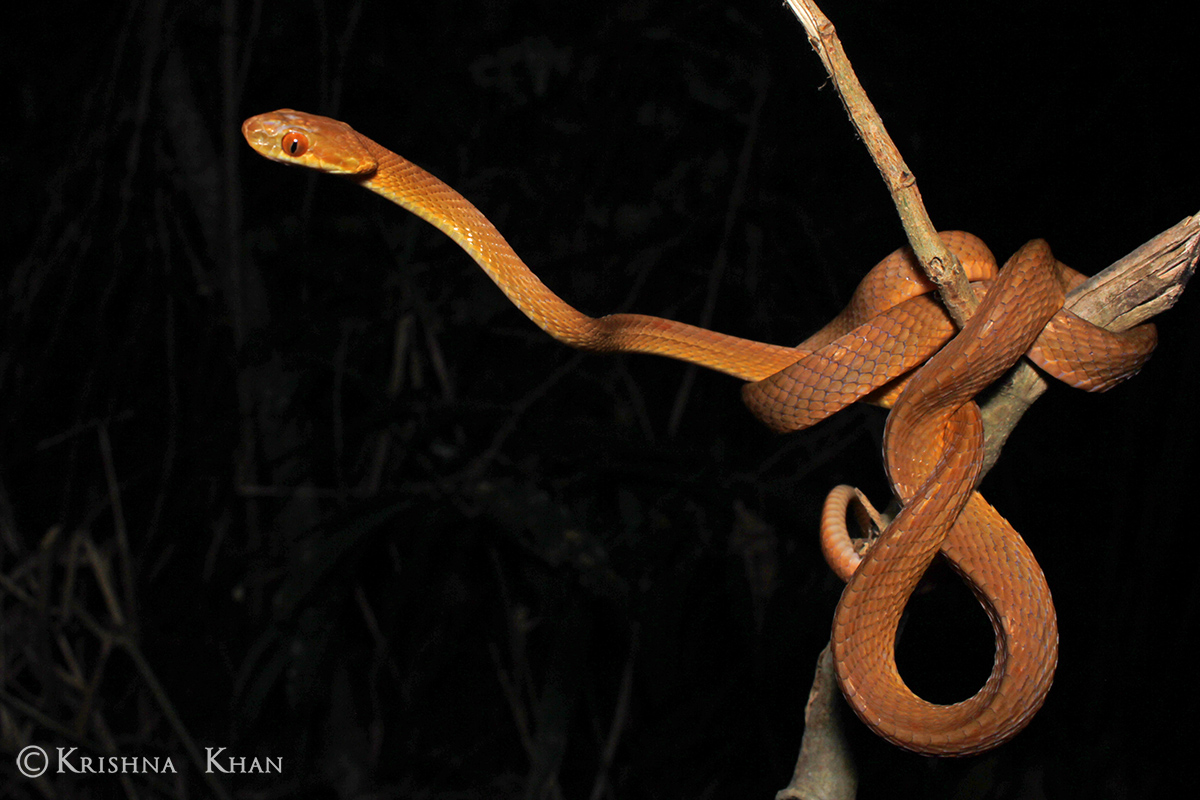

Conservation status
- Least Concern (IUCN 3.1)

Scientific classification
- Kingdom: Animalia
- Phylum: Chordata
- Class: Reptilia
- Order: Squamata
- Suborder: Serpentes
- Family: Colubridae
- Genus: Boiga
- Species: B. ochracea

Binomial name
- Boiga ochracea (Theobald, 1868)

Synonyms
- Dipsas ochracea Theobald, 1868; Dipsas ochraceus — Günther, 1868; Dipsas hexagonotus Stoliczka, 1871; Dipsadomorphus hexagonotus — Boulenger, 1896; Boiga ochracea — M.A. Smith, 1943

= Boiga ochracea =

Species of snake

Boiga ochracea, commonly called the tawny cat snake, is a species of rear-fanged snake in the family Colubridae. The species is endemic to South Asia.

== Geographic range ==
B. ochracea is found in the Andaman Islands, Bangladesh, Bhutan, India (Changlang District, Manipur), Myanmar, and Nepal. It is also found in China.

== Subspecies ==
Three subspecies are recognized as being valid, including the nominotypical subspecies.

- Boiga ochracea ochracea (Theobald, 1868)
- Boiga ochracea stoliczkae (Wall, 1909)
- Boiga ochracea walli M.A. Smith, 1943

Nota bene: A trinomial authority in parentheses indicates that the subspecies was originally described in a genus other than Boiga.

== Reproduction ==
B. ochracea is oviparous.

== Etymology ==
The subspecific names, stoliczkae and walli, are in honor of Moravian herpetologist Ferdinand Stoliczka and British herpetologist Frank Wall, respectively.
