= Rowena Seymour, Duchess of Somerset =

English noblewoman, philanthropist

Her Grace The Duchess of Somerset
- Known for: Philanthropy
- Born: Hon. Rowena Wall; July 1861
- Died: 13 November 1950 (aged 89)
- Noble family: House of Seymour (by marriage)
- Spouse: Edward Seymour, 16th Duke of Somerset
- Issue: Evelyn Seymour, 17th Duke of Somerset
- Father: George Wall

Rowena Seymour née Wall (July 1861 - 13 November 1950) was an English noblewoman, philanthropist and wife of Edward Seymour, 16th Duke of Somerset, who was styled as Duchess of Somerset from 22 October 1923.

== Early life and education ==
Seymour was the daughter of George Wall of Colombo, Ceylon and Mary Anne née Dixon. She was the sister of Arnold and Frank.

Seymour attended Badminton School and Cheltenham Ladies' College.

== Marriage and issue ==
On 28 July 1881, Seymour married Edward Seymour, 16th Duke of Somerset, a son of the Reverend Francis Payne Seymour, and the great-grandson of Lord Francis Seymour. Together, they had one son: Evelyn Seymour, 17th Duke of Somerset, born on 1 May 1882. Rowena died on 13 November 1950 at the age of 89.
