= Arnold Wall =

New Zealand polymath (1869–1966)

Arnold Wall CBE
- Born: 15 November 1869
- Died: 29 March 1966 (aged 96)
- Education: Harrow School
- Alma mater: Christ's College, Cambridge
- Parent: George Wall
- Relatives: Rowena Wall (sister); Frank Wall (brother)

Arnold Wall CBE (15 November 1869 – 29 March 1966) was a New Zealand university professor, philologist, poet, mountaineer, botanist, writer and radio broadcaster.

== Early life and education ==
He was born in Nuwara Eliya, Ceylon in 1869; his father was George Wall. His daughter Hilary married the adult educator Norman Richmond in 1926. He is the brother of Rowena Seymour, Duchess of Somerset and the uncle of Evelyn Seymour, 17th Duke of Somerset.

He was educated at Harrow School and Christ's College, Cambridge. He left Cambridge in 1897, having written his thesis on Scandinavian elements in English dialects.

== Career ==
Wall was appointed a Commander of the Order of the British Empire in the 1956 Queen's Birthday Honours, for services to education. He received an honorary doctorate (DSc) from the University of New Zealand in 1960.
