= Norman Richmond =

New Zealand adult education organiser (1897–1971)

Norman Macdonald Richmond (23 October 1897 – 13 July 1971) was a New Zealand adult education organiser and tutor, university lecturer, social reformer. He was born in Wellington, New Zealand in 1897. Helen Simpson was his elder sister. After a short war service, he won a Rhodes Scholarship in 1919, and taught at Christ's College in Christchurch before he commenced his studies. He married Hilary Wall in on 1 June 1926; she was the daughter of professor Arnold Wall. He became a lecturer and worked for various organisations and universities in New Zealand and Australia. In later life, he suffered from mental illness and was institutionalised. He died in Wellington on 13 July 1971; his wife had died in 1962.
