= Helen Simpson (lecturer) =

New Zealand teacher, writer (1890–1960)

- Born: 21 November 1890; Wellington
- Died: 6 November 1960 (aged 69); Christchurch
- Education: Canterbury College, University of London
- Occupation: teacher

Helen Macdonald Simpson (21 November 1890 – 6 November 1960) was a notable New Zealand teacher, university lecturer and writer. She was born in Wellington, New Zealand, in 1890. Norman Richmond was her younger brother.

== Life ==
She graduated from Canterbury College, and from the University of London with a PhD. She taught at Christchurch Training College. She was the first New Zealand woman to be awarded a doctorate, and also the first New Zealand woman to teach at a New Zealand university.

On 29 January 1927, she married Arthur Barrows Simpson. She wrote The women of New Zealand, a social history survey, which was published in 1940 as part of a government programme to mark 100 years of colonisation of New Zealand.
