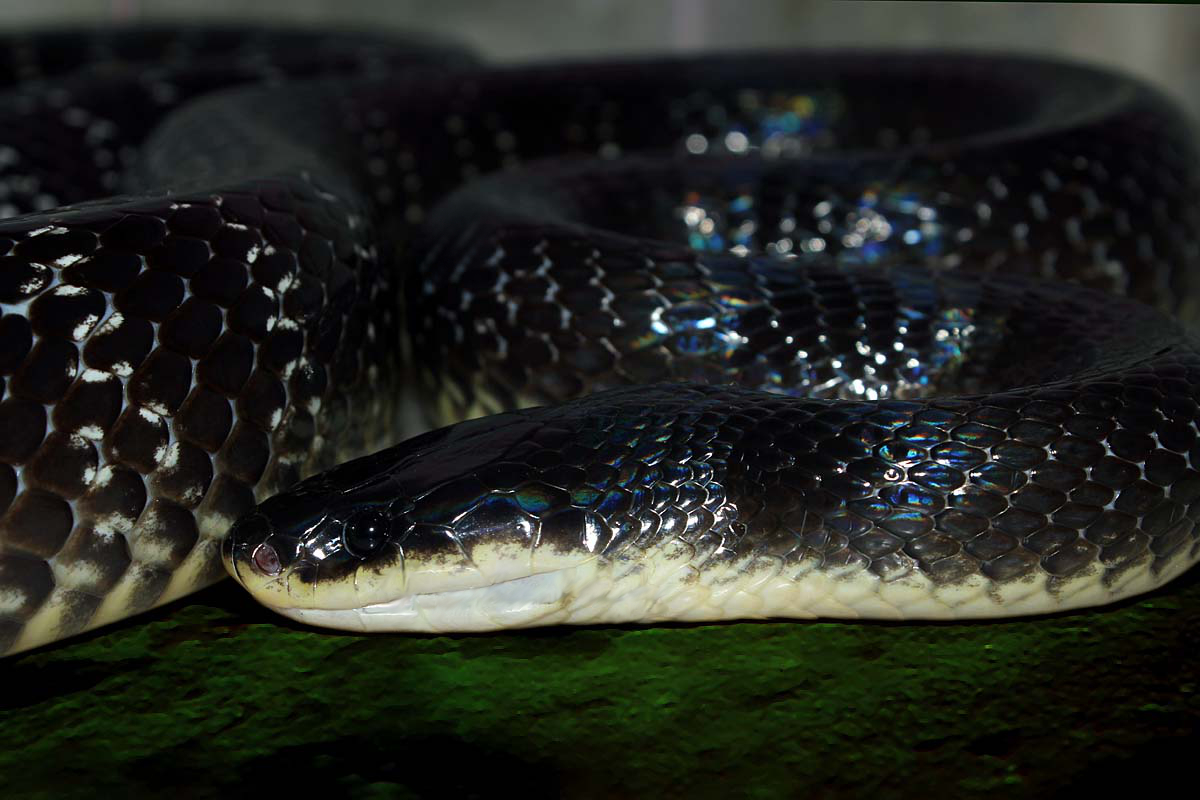

Conservation status
- Least Concern (IUCN 3.1)

Scientific classification
- Kingdom: Animalia
- Phylum: Chordata
- Class: Reptilia
- Order: Squamata
- Suborder: Serpentes
- Family: Elapidae
- Genus: Bungarus
- Species: B. sindanus

Binomial name
- Bungarus sindanus Boulenger, 1897
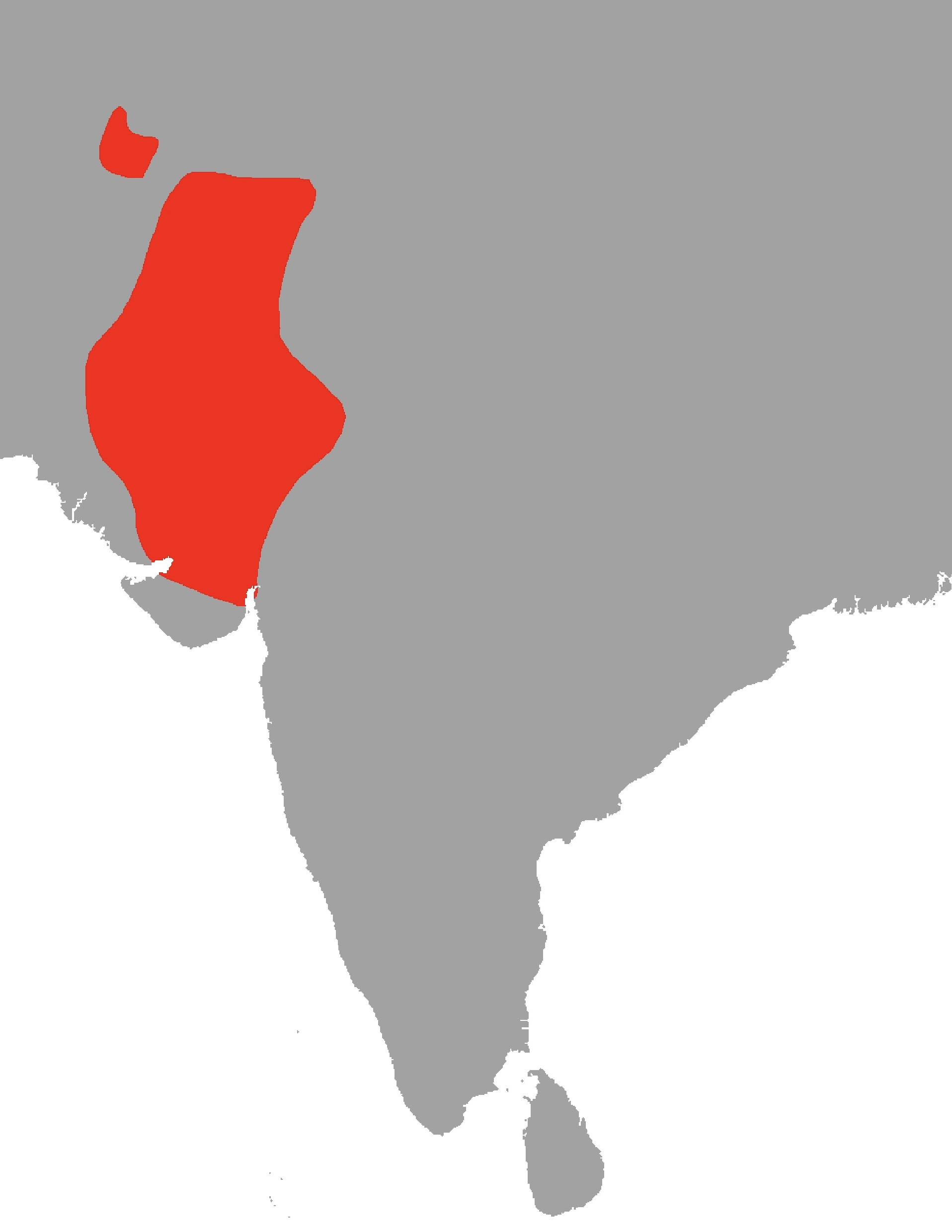

Synonyms
- Bungarus caeruleus sindanus Boulenger, 1897; Bungarus caeruleus sindanus — Klemmer, 1963

= Bungarus sindanus =

Species of snake

Bungarus sindanus, the Sind krait, is a species of krait, a highly venomous elapid snake found in Bangladesh, northwestern India, Afghanistan, and Pakistan. It can be confused with the common krait.

== Description ==
The Sind krait is generally 1 m (3 ft) with some specimens as long as 1.8 m (6 ft). Their most visible feature is their narrow white bands, though the bands can be either yellow or grey depending on the color variation. The young have white spots on one-third of their body instead of bands (which develop at maturity). They have an egg-shaped head with a short snout, small eyes with vertically oval pupil, upper lips either yellow or white and pointed tip tail. Dorsal scales are smooth and glossy with the vertebral row enlarged and hexagonal.

Rostral scale broader than deep, the portion visible from above measuring one-third to two-fifths its distance from the frontal; internasals about half as long as the prefrontals; one pre- and two postoculars; temporals 1+2; seven upper labials, third and fourth entering the eye; three or four lower labials in contact with the anterior chin shields, which are as long as the posterior. Dorsal scales in 17 or 19 rows, vertibrals strongly enlarged, but none broader than long. Ventrals 220–237; anal entire; subcaudals 49–52, single or a few of the hindermost in pairs.

Black above, white below; transverse series of white spots on the body forming interrupted cross-bands same as often present in B. caeruleus; rostral, upper labials, anterior nasal and preocular, white.

== Behavior ==
Sind kraits are primarily nocturnal, and often (unintentionally) cross paths with humans and domestic animals. Usually, people who are bitten simply don't see the animal; its camouflage, colouring and temporarily remaining still are generally enough to protect it, lest it be so effective that they are accidentally stepped on. This is when the krait reacts in a scared manner, striking. Other instances involve a krait inadvertently showing itself, causing people to overreact. When they attempt to scare or kill the krait, they end up being bitten.

== Distribution and habitat ==
B. sindanus is found northwestern India, Pakistan, and Afghanistan. Within India, specifically, it has been recorded in the states of Sindh,Gujarat, Maharashtra, Punjab, and Rajasthan.

The previously considered as subspecies Bungarus sindanus walli Wall, 1907 is now recognized as Bungarus walli Wall, 1907.

== Etymology ==
It is known as the Sindh or Sind krait after being originally discovered in the Sindh province, Pakistan.
