= Evelyn Seymour, 17th Duke of Somerset =

British soldier and landowner (1882–1954)

His Grace The Duke of Somerset DSO OBE DL
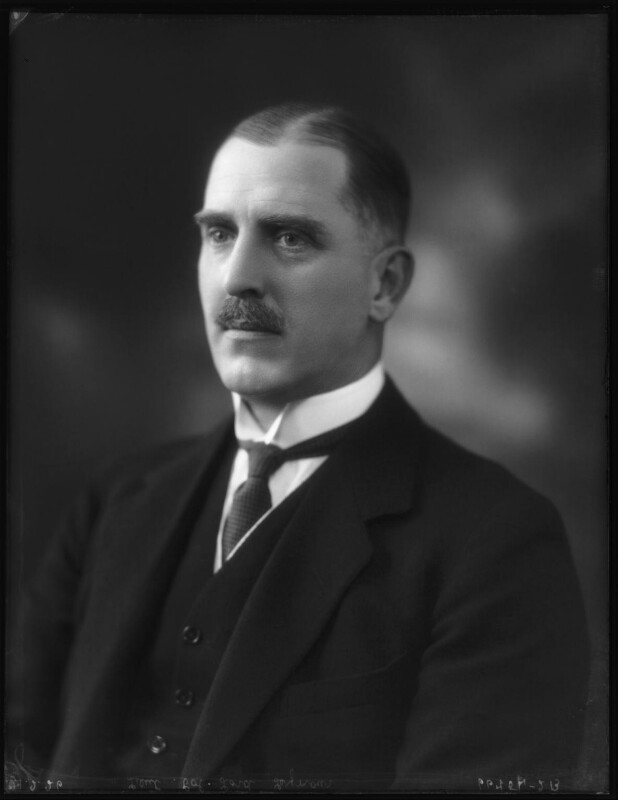
- Seymour in 1926

Personal details
- Born: Evelyn Francis Edward Seymour; 1 May 1882 Kandy, Ceylon
- Died: 26 April 1954 (aged 71) London
- Spouse: Edith Mary Parker (m. 1906)
- Children: Francis William Seymour; Algernon Francis Edward Seymour; Percy Seymour, 18th Duke of Somerset; Lady Susan Mary Seymour
- Parents: Edward Seymour, 16th Duke of Somerset (father); Rowena Wall (mother)
- Education: Blundell's School
- Alma mater: Royal Military College, Sandhurst
- Occupation: British peer

Evelyn Francis Edward Seymour, 17th Duke of Somerset DSO OBE DL (1 May 1882 – 26 April 1954), styled as Lord Seymour between 1923–1931, was a British Army officer, landowner, peer, and for eight years Lord Lieutenant of Wiltshire. He was also a baronet.

== Early life ==
The son of Edward Seymour, 16th Duke of Somerset, by his marriage to Rowena Wall, Seymour was born in Colombo, Ceylon. His maternal grandfather, George Wall, was a coffee merchant and botanist.

He was educated at Blundell's School, Tiverton, and later at the Royal Military College, Sandhurst.

== Career ==
Seymour was gazetted a second lieutenant on the Unattached List in January 1901, before being attached to the Royal Dublin Fusiliers. He served throughout the Second Boer War (1901–02) and received the Queen's South Africa Medal with five clasps. He took part in the operations in the Aden Protectorate in 1903.

In April 1913, Seymour, then of the Royal Dublin Fusiliers, was appointed adjutant of the 25th (County of London) Cyclist Battalion of the London Regiment, in which posting he continued until 1916, before returning to the Royal Dublin Fusiliers to take command of its 10th Battalion. In December 1917, he was promoted Acting Lieutenant Colonel. In 1918, he was awarded the Distinguished Service Order and in 1919 he served in the Adjutant-General's department of the War Office. He was appointed to the Order of the British Empire in 1919 and retired from the service in 1920. He succeeded to his father's dukedom in 1931.

On 12 May 1937, he bore the Sceptre with the Cross at the coronation of King George VI.

During the Second World War, Somerset returned to the army. With effect from 1 November 1939, he was appointed a Lieutenant Colonel of the Devonshire Regiment, in which he commanded a battalion, and he later held an appointment as a full Colonel on the General Staff.

=== Later life ===
On his retirement from active service with the Army, Somerset returned to Maiden Bradley to take charge of his estates in Wiltshire and Somerset. On 4 May 1942 he was appointed Lord Lieutenant of Wiltshire, succeeding Ernest Wills.

On 19 March 1949, "having exceeded the age limit", he relinquished his commission as an honorary Colonel of the Devon Regiment on retired pay. In 1950, he was appointed a knight of the Venerable Order of Saint John.

He was a member of the Army and Navy Club, the Naval & Military Club, and the Marylebone Cricket Club.

== Personal life ==
In London on 3 January 1906, he married Edith Mary Parker (d. Maiden Bradley, Wiltshire, 19 April 1962), daughter of William Parker (1816–1893), of Whittington Hall, Derbyshire, England, and Lucinda Steeves (1842–1920), daughter of William Steeves. Evelyn and Edith had four children:

- Francis William Seymour (1906–1907), who died young.
- Algernon Francis Edward Seymour (1908–1911), who died young.
- Percy Hamilton Seymour, 18th Duke of Somerset (1910–1984)
- Lady Susan Mary Seymour (1913–2004), who died unmarried and without issue.

Somerset was a member of The Magic Circle for many years, having first joined it in 1907, after becoming a pupil of the magician Ernest Noakes. He became the organization's president in 1935, after the death of Lord Ampthill.

== Death and estate ==
The Duke died in London on 26 April 1954, and was succeeded by his only surviving son Percy, Lord Seymour as 18th Duke of Somerset. The 17th Duke had placed the bulk of the family estate in a Trust for the benefit of his son in 1952; however, as he did not survive this settlement by five years the estates were still subjected to estate tax. The Duke's personal estate was valued at £20,248 gross (£18,227 net), upon which £12,026 in estate duty was levied. The settled lands, consisting of approximately 13,000 acres, were estimated at £250,000 for probate in December 1954.

== Ancestry ==
Ancestors of Evelyn Seymour, 17th Duke of Somerset

Colonel Francis Compton Seymour
Captain Francis Edward Seymour
Leonora Perkins
Reverend Francis Payne Seymour
Charles Cooke
Elizabeth Cooke
Edward Seymour, 16th Duke of Somerset
Robert Charles Dallas
Reverend Alexander Dallas
Sarah Harding
Jane Margaret Dallas
Robert Ferguson
Mary Anne Ferguson
Evelyn Seymour, 17th Duke of Somerset
Reverend George Wall
George Wall
Thomas Lytham
Ann Lytham
Rowena Wall
George Dixon
Charles Dixon
Mary Anne Dixon
Thomas Fletcher
Mary Anne Fletcher

Honorary titles
Preceded by Sir Ernest Wills, Bt	Lord Lieutenant of Wiltshire; 1942–1954	Succeeded by The Lord Herbert
Peerage of England
Preceded by Edward Seymour	Duke of Somerset; 1931–1954	Succeeded by Percy Seymour
