= Frank Wall (herpetologist) =

British herpetologist

Colonel Frank Wall
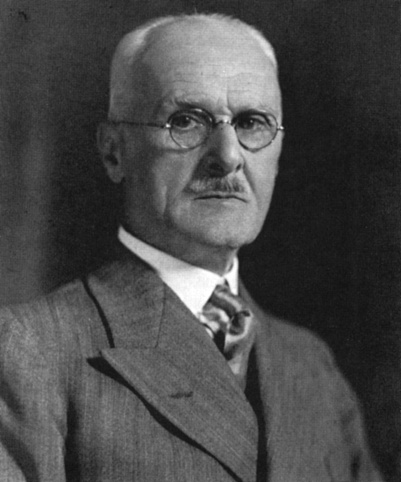
- Portrait of Frank Wall (1935)
- Born: 21 April 1868; Colombo, Ceylon
- Died: 19 May 1950 (aged 82); Bournemouth, England
- Education: Harrow School
- Occupations: Physician and herpetologist
- Relatives: George Wall (father); Arnold Wall (brother); Rowena Seymour, Duchess of Somerset (sister); Evelyn Seymour, 17th Duke of Somerset (nephew)

Colonel Frank Wall (21 April 1868 – 19 May 1950) was a physician and herpetologist who lived in Sri Lanka and India.

== Early life and education ==
Wall was born in Colombo, Ceylon (now Sri Lanka). His father, George Wall, was responsible for initiating the study of natural history on the island. Wall was sent to England to be educated at Harrow School, the same school his father and brothers attended, and studied medicine in London before joining the Indian Medical Service in 1893.

== Herpetology ==
Sent to India under the British Raj, Wall continued to work there until 1925 and researched many animals, especially snakes. He collected numerous snakes, many of which are now in the collections of the British Museum and the Natural History Museum, London.

Wall was a member of the Bombay Natural History Society and published more than 200 scientific articles, as well as the book A Popular Treatise on the Common Indian Snakes. He described approximately 30 new species of snakes.

In 1913, the third edition of his book, The poisonous Terrestrial Snakes of our British Indian Dominions, Including Ceylon, and How to Recognise Them; With Symptoms of Snake Poisoning and Treatment, was published.

He was the brother of Arnold Wall and Rowena Wall, later Rowena Seymour, Duchess of Somerset, and the uncle of Evelyn Seymour, 17th Duke of Somerset.

Frank Wall died in Bournemouth, England on 19 May 1950.

== Legacy ==
Wall is commemorated in the scientific names of five reptiles: Boiga ochracea walli, Bungarus sindanus walli, Cyrtodactylus walli, Hypnale walli, and Lycodon rufozonatus walli.

Along with Malcolm Arthur Smith, Wall is acknowledged as one of the two most important pioneers in the study of Indian herpetology.

Since Wall's death, some of his books, including Ophidia Taprobanica or The Snakes of Ceylon, have been republished.

== Bibliography ==
- A Popular Treatise on the Common Indian Snakes (Bombay: 1900)
- The Poisonous Terrestrial Snakes of Our British Indian Dominions Including Ceylon and how to Recognise Them: With Symptoms of Snake Poisoning and Treatment (Bombay: 1917)
- A Monograph of the Sea Snakes (London: 1919)
- Notes on Some Ceylon Snakes (Bombay: 1921)
- Ophidia Taprobanica: Or, The Snakes of Ceylon (London: 1921)
