= George Wall (botanist) =

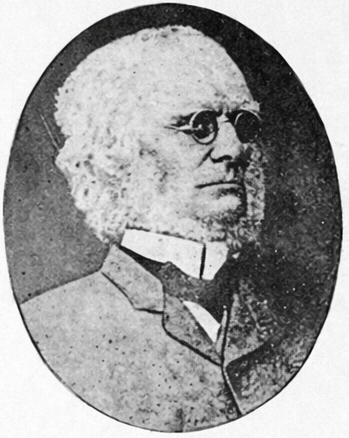
- Born: 22 December 1821; North Shields, England
- Died: 18 December 1894 (aged 73); London, England
- Monuments: George Wall Memorial Fountain, Colombo Sri Lanka
- Education: Harrow School
- Occupations: Merchant, Planter, Politician, Amateur astronomer, Botanist, Humanitarian
- Children: Rowena; Arnold; Frank

George Wall (22 December 1821 – 18 December 1894) was a merchant, coffee planter, politician, amateur astronomer, botanist and humanitarian in Ceylon.

== Early life and education ==
George Wall, was born on 22 December 1820 in North Shields, Northumberland, England, the second son of George Wall (1774-1852), a Methodist Minister, and Ann née Leetham. He attended Harrow School. Wall began his career in the engineering firm of Sir Joseph Whitworth. Suffering ill health, in September 1846 he moved to Ceylon to take advantage of the climate, and was made acting manager of the Ceylon Plantation Company in Kandy. He remained with the company until 1854, when he established his own business, George Wall and Company, Coffee Merchants and Estate Agents.

== Coffee and other trade ==
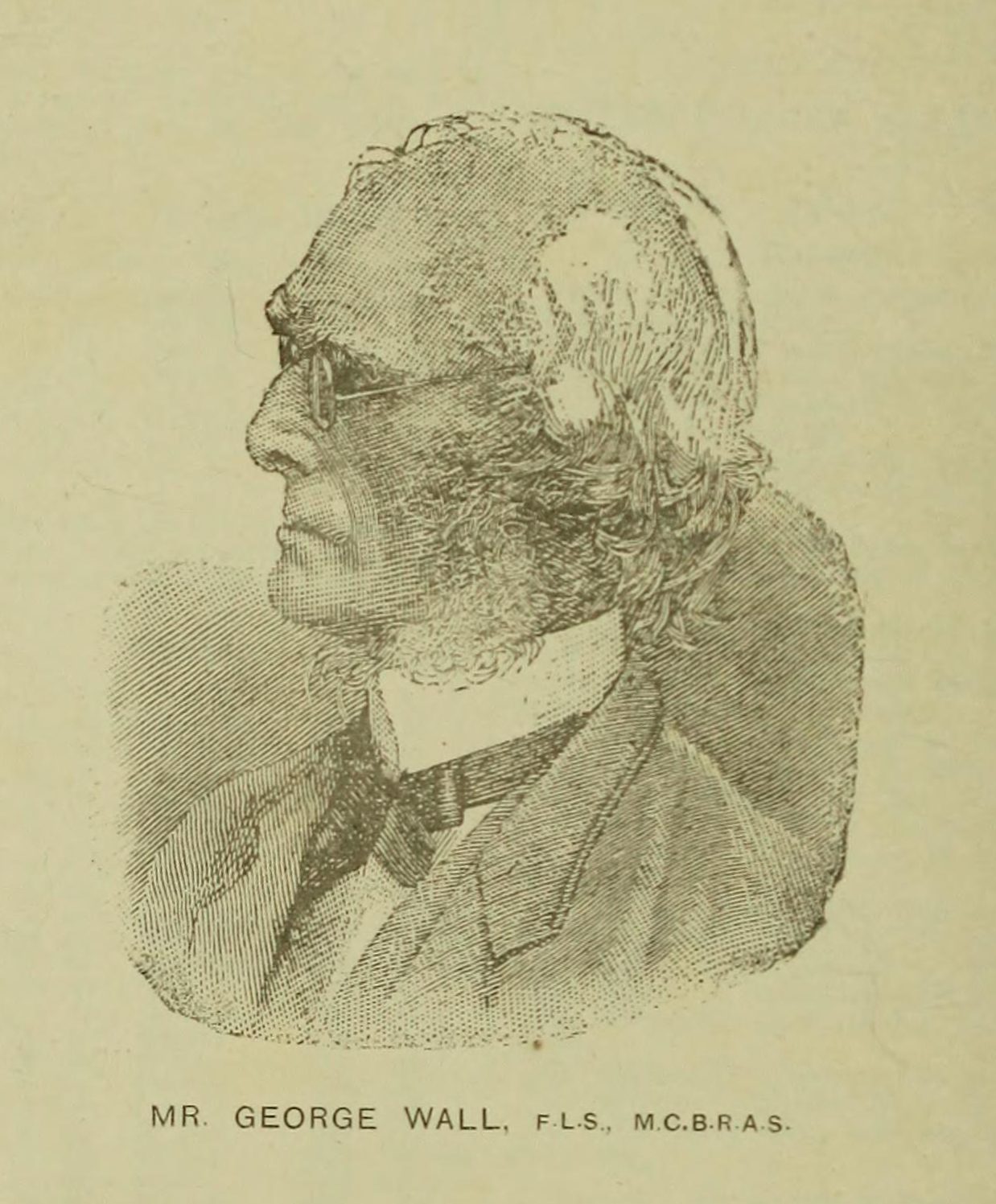
George Wall

Wall opened an office in Colombo and the business soon grew into an important concern, with Wall rising to prominence, accordingly. He became the first Englishman to chair the Planters' Association of Ceylon (1856–1857) and was re-elected Chairman nine times. From 1858 Wall sat on the Legislative Council of Ceylon as an unofficial member, supporting the case against the Paddy Tax. On 15 November 1864, Wall along with James De Alwis, Charles Lorenz, W. Thompson, John Capper and John Eaton resigned from the Council on a point of principle regarding the fiscal policy of the Government and its strict disregard to respect the procedures of the Legislative Council.

Wall returned to England in 1859 and spent the next four years in Manchester, where he served as a partner with his former employer, Sir Joseph Whitworth & Co., enjoying success in small arms manufacturing. Upon his return to Ceylon, he was elected chair of the Ceylon Chamber of Commerce in 1866. He was made a fellow of the Royal Astronomical Society in February 1872 and the Linnean Society of London. Wall's business eventually suspended operations in August 1879 following a devastating outbreak of coffee blight. George Wall and Company was subsequently taken over by Bosanquet and Company.

== Botany and later life ==
Alongside his business activities, Wall was a keen botanist and amateur astronomer. He was especially interested in ferns and built up a significant herbarium of plants from Ceylon. Several of his collections are held at University of Reading Herbarium in the Katharine Murray Lyell collection. In 1889 he became the editor of the Ceylon Independent newspaper, a position he retained for six years. In 1892 Wall received the Gold Medal from the Cobden Club for his efforts in abolishing the Ceylon Grain tax. After falling ill in 1894 he returned to England for treatment at St. Thomas' Hospital, where he died in December that year. He was married twice (Alice née Makinson (1822–1854), the cousin of Edward Watkin and Mary Anne née Dixon, and had thirteen children. One of his sons, Arnold (1869–1966), went on to become a professor of botany in New Zealand and another, Frank, also became a naturalist. His daughter Rowena married Edward Seymour, 16th Duke of Somerset in 1881. He died on 18 December 1894.

== Legacy ==
Wall Street in Kotahena, Sri Lanka, is named in honour of George Wall. A Hindu-Saracenic fountain at the Lipton Circus junction in Cinnamon Gardens, Colombo was erected in memory of Wall.

The standard author abbreviation G.Wall is used to indicate this person as the author when citing a botanical name.

== Bibliography ==
- Wall, George (1873). A Catalogue of Ferns Indigenous to Ceylon According to the Nomenclature of Synopsis Filicum of Hooker and Baker. London.
- Wall, George (1879). A Checklist of Ceylon Ferns. London.
- Wall, George (1887). The Natural History of Thought in Its Practical Aspect, From Its Origin in Infancy. London: Trübner & Co.
