= Hypnale walli =

Scientific classification
- Kingdom: Animalia
- Phylum: Chordata
- Order: Squamata
- Suborder: Serpentes
- Family: Viperidae
- Genus: Hypnale
- Species: H. walli

Binomial name
- Hypnale walli Gloyd, 1977

Synonyms
- Ancistrodon hypnale — Boulenger, 1896 (part); Ancistrodon millardi — Wall, 1921 (part?); Ancistrodon nepa — M.A. Smith, 1943 (part); Agkistrodon nepa — Deraniyagala, 1955 (part?); Hypnale walli Gloyd, 1977

Species of snake

Hypnale walli, or Wall's hump-nosed viper, is a venomous pitviper species endemic to Sri Lanka. The smallest member of its genus, it is distinguished by having a strongly upturned nose and lower scale counts. No subspecies are currently recognized.

== Etymology ==
The specific name, walli, is in honor of Ceylonese-born British herpetologist Frank Wall.

== Description ==
The smallest member of the genus Hypnale, the only male with a complete tail measured 30.5 cm (12.0 in) in total length with a tail of 4.3 cm (1 3/4 in) (14% of total length), while the largest female was 28.3 cm (11 1/4 in) in total length with a tail of 3.5 cm (1 1/2 in) (12% of total length). The body is stoutly built.

This species is distinguished from H. hypnale by a snout that has a strongly upturned tip. This is due to an extended rostral scale, which is immediately followed by a raised wart-like hump covered with 10 minute scales. Also, the hemipenes have clearly visible spines. It is distinguished from H. nepa by its lower scale counts.

The scalation includes 17 rows of dorsal scales at midbody that usually lack keels, 7 supralabial scales, 120–126 ventral scales, and 28–33 subcaudal scales.

Regarding the color pattern, Gloyd and Conant (1990) examined a number of preserved specimens, mentioning that some were so faded as to render the pattern almost invisible. One of these, however, had a faint narrow stripe down the center of its back. In general, the color pattern is described as consisting of a series of 18–24 dorsolateral small subtriangular brown blotches, pointing upwards. These are slightly darker than the ground color, except for the upper edges that may be considerably darker. A pair of dark brown blotches are present on the side of the head, along with a pair of dark stripes curving backward on the sides of the neck. The ventral surface is strongly flecked and dappled with grayish brown.

== Geographic range ==
Hypnale walli is found in Sri Lanka. The type locality given is "Kanneliya Forest, Udugama Southern Province, Ceylon [Sri Lanka], elevation approximately 1,000 ft [300 m]".

== Taxonomy ==
According to Gloyd and Conant (1990), the taxonomic status of this species is unclear. Although described here as a species, it may eventually be classified as a subspecies of H. nepa, or even as the minimum extreme for H. nepa with regard to its low ventral and subcaudal scale counts, as well as its relatively short tail.
