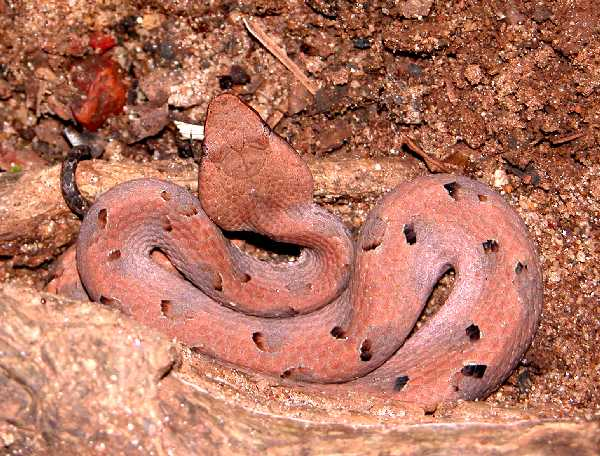
- Hump-nosed viper, H. hypnale.

Scientific classification
- Kingdom: Animalia
- Phylum: Chordata
- Class: Reptilia
- Order: Squamata
- Suborder: Serpentes
- Family: Viperidae
- Subfamily: Crotalinae
- Genus: Hypnale; Fitzinger, 1843

= Hypnale =

Genus of snakes

Common names: hump-nosed vipers, hump-nosed pit vipers.

Hypnale is a genus of pit vipers endemic to Sri Lanka and southwestern India. Three monotypic species are currently recognized (no subspecies). All members have more or less upturned snouts that produce a hump-nosed effect.

== Description ==
Members of this genus grow to a maximum total length of 55 cm (21 5/8 in) (for H. hypnale). The body is stout, but relatively slender compared to most other crotalines. The tail length accounts for 14-18% of total length in males, 11-16% in females.

The snout is more or less upturned, with two species having a wart-like protuberance at the tip that is covered with tiny scales. The anterior head shields are strongly fragmented, but the frontal scale, supraoculars and parietals are complete and quite large. The nasal scale is single, but it may have a groove that extends towards its upper edge. There are two preoculars and 2-4 postoculars. The loreal scale is single, but extends across the canthus rostralis so that it can be seen from above. The supralabials and sublabials both number 7-9. Bordering the supralabials are 3-4 enlarged temporal scales, above which are 3-5 irregular rows of temporal scales. There is one pair of chin shields, each of which is slightly longer than it is wide.

At midbody there are 17 rows of dorsal scales, which are weakly keeled. Apical pits are present, but very difficult to see. The keels are faint or may be entirely absent on the first two scale rows bordering the ventrals. The ventral scales number 120-158, while the subcaudals vary in number from 28 to 48 (almost all are paired).

== Geographic range ==
Species of the genus Hypnale are found in Sri Lanka and India, from almost sea level to an elevation of at least 1,829 m (6,001 ft). In India they are found in the Western Ghats as far north as 16° north latitude.

== Habitat ==
They occur in dense jungles, dry forests, rain forests, both in low and hilly country, and in plantations. They sometimes are also found near or in human habitations.

== Behavior ==
They are mostly nocturnal, but are often seen coiled in the shade during the day, moving around on cloudy days or under low light conditions. They are generally inoffensive, both in the wild and in captivity, rarely attempting to bite unless restrained or injured.

== Feeding ==
Their diet includes lizards, snakes, frogs, reptile eggs, and small mammals.

== Reproduction ==
All members of this genus are viviparous.

== Species ==
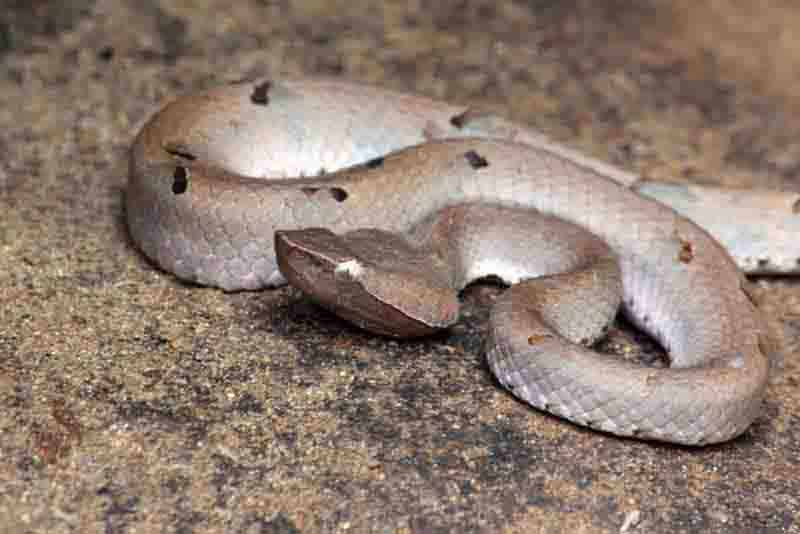
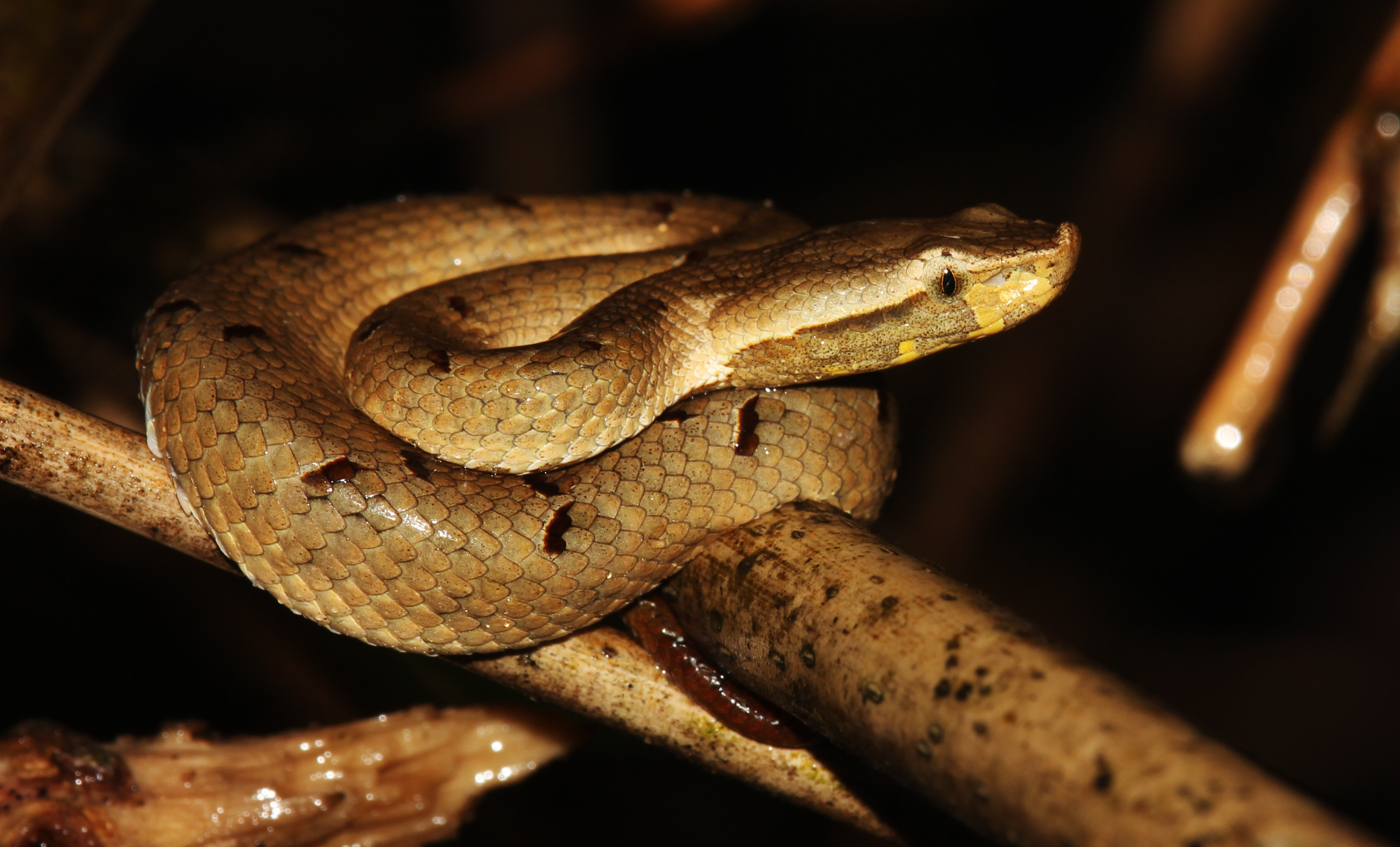
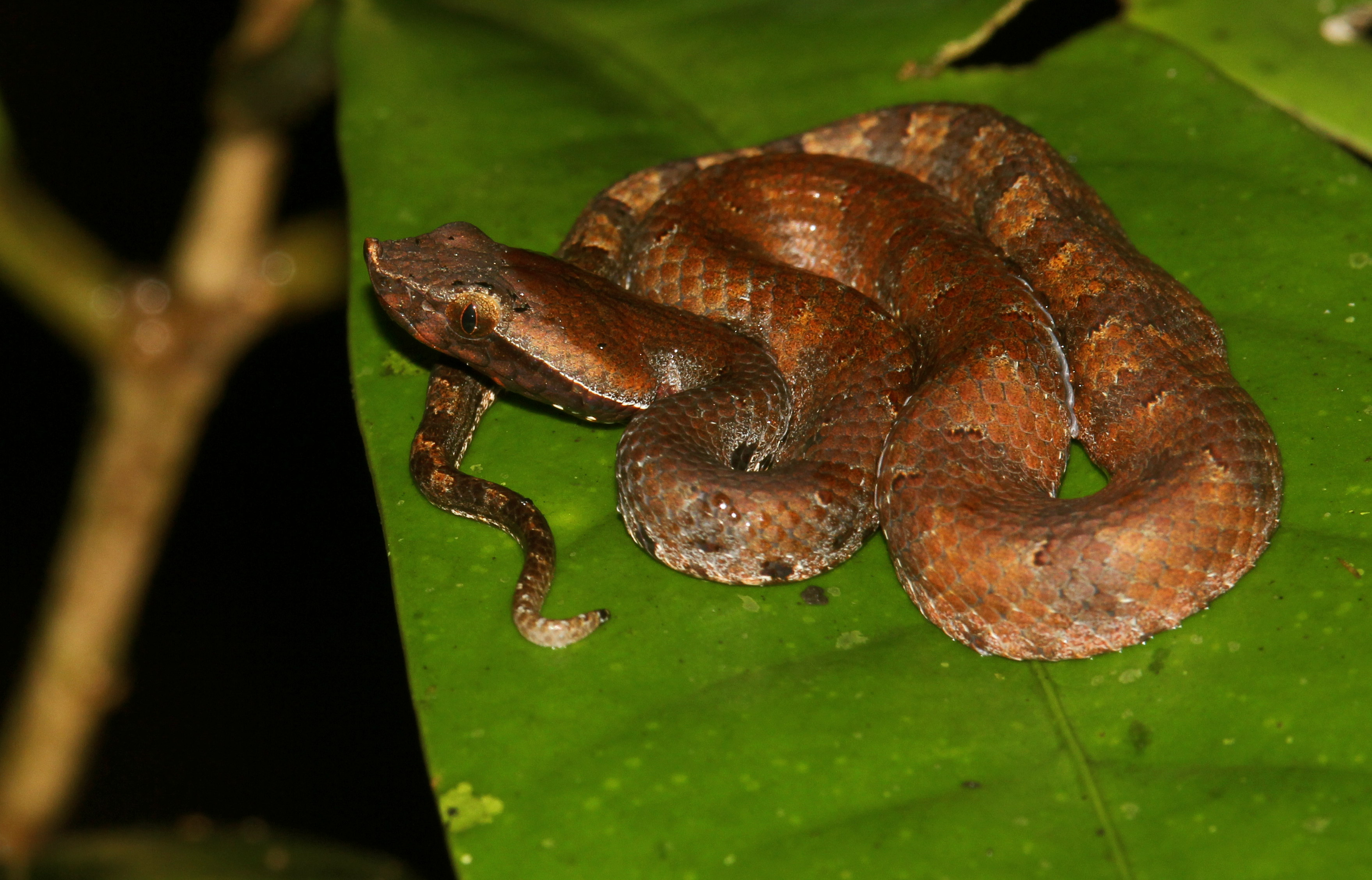
Image	Species	Taxon author	Common name	Geographic range
	H. hypnale^{T}	(Merrem, 1820)	Hump-nosed viper	Peninsular India to the Western Ghats as far north as 16° N, and Sri Lanka.
	H. nepa	(Laurenti, 1768)	Sri Lankan hump-nosed viper	In Sri Lanka throughout forested areas, from lowland rainforest to over 1,800 m (5,900 ft) altitude.
	H. zara	(Gray), 1849	Gray's hump-nosed viper	Sri Lanka.

^{T}) Type species.

A new species called Hypnale sp. Amal, recently described, but not yet given species status.

== Taxonomy ==
According to Gloyd and Conant (1990), members of this group seem to be closely related to the genus Calloselasma.
