= Duchess of Beaufort =

British title

Duchess of Beaufort is a title held by the wife of the Duke of Beaufort in the Peerage of England. In 1657 Henry Somerset, 3rd Marquess of Worcester married Mary Capell and in 1682 the dukedom was created by Charles II, making Henry the first Duke and Mary the first Duchess of Beaufort.

The dukedom was named after Henry Somerset's fifth great-grandfather Henry Beaufort, 3rd Duke of Somerset, whose legitimized children held the surname Somerset. The name Beaufort refers to a castle in Champagne, France (now Montmorency-Beaufort) and it is the only current dukedom to take its name from a place outside the British Isles.

The family seat is Badminton House near Chipping Sodbury in the unitary authority of South Gloucestershire. The principal burial place of the Dukes and Duchesses of Beaufort is St Michael and All Angels Church, Badminton.

== Duchesses of Beaufort ==
- 2 December 1682 – 21 January 1700: Mary Somerset, Duchess of Beaufort (1630–1715), born Mary Capell. Wife of Henry Somerset, 1st Duke of Beaufort
- 7 July 1702 – 18 June 1705: Mary Somerset, Duchess of Beaufort, born Mary Sackville. First wife of Henry Somerset, 2nd Duke of Beaufort
- 26 February 1706 – 13 September 1709: Rachel Somerset, Duchess of Beaufort, born Rachel Noel. Second wife of Henry Somerset, 2nd Duke of Beaufort
- 14 September 1711 – 24 May 1714: Mary Somerset, Duchess of Beaufort, born Mary Osborne. Third wife of Henry Somerset, 2nd Duke of Beaufort
- 28 June 1729 – March 1743: Frances Scudamore. Wife of Henry Scudamore, 3rd Duke of Beaufort (divorced March 1743)
- 24 February 1746 – 28 October 1756: Elizabeth Somerset, Duchess of Beaufort, born Elizabeth Berkeley. Wife of Charles Somerset, 4th Duke of Beaufort
- 2 January 1766 – 11 October 1803: Elizabeth Somerset, Duchess of Beaufort, born Elizabeth Boscawen. Wife of Henry Somerset, 5th Duke of Beaufort
- 11 October 1803 – 23 November 1835. Charlotte Sophia Somerset, Duchess of Beaufort, born Lady Charlotte Sophia Leveson-Gower. Wife of Henry Somerset, 6th Duke of Beaufort
- 23 November 1835 – 17 November 1853. Emily Frances Somerset, Duchess of Beaufort, born Emily Frances Smith. Second wife of Henry Somerset, 7th Duke of Beaufort
- 17 November 1853 – 30 April 1899. Georgiana Charlotte Somerset, Duchess of Beaufort, born Lady Georgiana Charlotte Curzon. Wife of Henry Somerset, 8th Duke of Beaufort
- 30 April 1899 – 24 November 1924. Louise Emily Somerset, Duchess of Beaufort, born Louise Emily Harford. Wife of Henry Somerset, 9th Duke of Beaufort
- 24 November 1924 – 5 February 1984. Mary Somerset, Duchess of Beaufort, born Princess Mary of Teck and later The Lady Victoria Constance Mary Cambridge. Wife of Henry Somerset, 10th Duke of Beaufort
- 5 February 1984 – 22 April 1995. Caroline Jane Somerset, Duchess of Beaufort, born Lady Caroline Jane Thynne. First wife of David Somerset, 11th Duke of Beaufort
- 2 June 2000 – 16 August 2017. Miranda Elisabeth Somerset, Duchess of Beaufort, born Miranda Elisabeth Morley. Second wife of David Somerset, 11th Duke of Beaufort
- 16 August 2017. Tracy Somerset, Duchess of Beaufort, born Tracy Louise Ward. First wife of Henry Somerset, 12th Duke of Beaufort
- 30 April 2018 - Current holder. Georgia Somerset, Duchess of Beaufort, born Georgia Powell. Second wife of Henry Somerset, 12th Duke of Beaufort

== Dowager Duchesses of Beaufort ==
Traditionally a widowed peeress puts "Dowager" in her style. If a widowed peeress is also predeceased by the next Duke, any surviving widow of that Duke does not use the style of Dowager until the current dowager has died or remarried (see Courtesy titles in the United Kingdom: Widows).

- 21 January 1700 – 7 January 1715: Mary Somerset, Dowager Duchess of Beaufort, born Mary Capell. Widow of Henry Somerset, 1st Duke of Beaufort.
- 7 January 1715 – 15 October 1715 (her second marriage): Mary Somerset, Dowager Duchess of Beaufort, born Mary Osborne. Widow of Henry Somerset, 2nd Duke of Beaufort. Later Mary Cochrane, Countess of Dundonald.
- 28 October 1756 – 9 April 1799: Elizabeth Somerset, Dowager Duchess of Beaufort, born Elizabeth Berkeley. Widow of Charles Somerset, 4th Duke of Beaufort.
- 11 October 1803 – 15 June 1828: Elizabeth Somerset, Dowager Duchess of Beaufort, born Elizabeth Boscawen. Widow of Henry Somerset, 5th Duke of Beaufort.
- 23 November 1835 – 12 Aug 1854: Charlotte Sophia Somerset, Dowager Duchess of Beaufort, born Lady Charlotte Sophia Leveson-Gower. Widow of Henry Somerset, 6th Duke of Beaufort.
- 12 Aug 1854 – 2 October 1889: Emily Frances Somerset, Dowager Duchess of Beaufort, born Emily Frances Smith. Widow of Henry Somerset, 7th Duke of Beaufort.
- 2 October 1889 – 14 May 1906: Georgiana Charlotte Somerset, Dowager Duchess of Beaufort, born Lady Georgiana Charlotte Curzon. Widow of Henry Somerset, 8th Duke of Beaufort.
- 24 November 1924 – 11 October 1945: Louise Emily Somerset, Dowager Duchess of Beaufort, born Louise Emily Harford. Widow of Henry Somerset, 9th Duke of Beaufort.
- 5 February 1984 – 23 June 1987: Mary Somerset, Dowager Duchess of Beaufort, born Princess Mary of Teck and later The Lady Victoria Constance Mary Cambridge. Widow of Henry Somerset, 10th Duke of Beaufort.
- Since 16 August 2017: Miranda Elisabeth Somerset, Duchess of Beaufort, born Miranda Elisabeth Morley. Second wife and widow of David Somerset, 11th Duke of Beaufort
