= Mary Somerset =

Mary Somerset may refer to:

- St Mary Somerset, a church in the City of London
- Lady Mary Somerset of Worcester, Baroness Grey de Wilton
- Mary FitzRoy, Duchess of Richmond and Somerset (1519–1557), daughter-in-law of King Henry VIII of England
- Mary Somerset, Duchess of Beaufort (gardener) (1630–1715), introduced a number of exotic plants to British gardens
- Mary Somerset, Duchess of Beaufort (sportswoman) (1897–1987), relative of the British royal family
