= Mary Butler =

Mary Butler may refer to:

- Lady Mary Butler (1689–1713), Irish-born English baroness; second daughter of the 2nd Duke of Ormonde
- Mary Anne Butler, Australian playwright
- Mary Butler, Duchess of Ormonde (1664–1733), Irish duchess
- Mary Butler Duncan Dana, American wife of journalist and editor Paul Dana
- Mary Butler Lewis (1903–1970), American anthropologist and archeologist
- Mary Butler (politician) (born 1963), Irish politician
- Mary E.L. Butler (1874–1920), Irish writer and Irish-language activist
- Mary Hawkins Butler (born 1953), American mayor of Madison, Mississippi
- Mary Joseph Butler (1641–1723), Irish abbess
- Lady Mary Fitzwilliam (née Butler) (1846–1929), British aristocrat and courtier
