= Mary Somerset, Duchess of Beaufort =

Mary Somerset, Duchess of Beaufort may refer to:

- Mary Somerset, Duchess of Beaufort (gardener) (1630–1715), introduced a number of exotic plants to British gardens
- Mary Somerset, Duchess of Beaufort (sportswoman) (1897–1987), relative of the British royal family
