= Duke of Beaufort =

Title in the Peerage of England

Dukedom of Beaufort
- Quarterly, 1st and 4th, azure three fleurs-de-lys or (for France); 2nd and 3rd, gules three lions passant guardant in pale or (for England), all within a bordure compony argent and azure
- Creation date: 2 December 1682
- Created by: Charles II
- Peerage: Peerage of England
- First holder: Henry Somerset, 3rd Marquess of Worcester
- Present holder: Henry Somerset, 12th Duke of Beaufort
- Heir apparent: Henry Robert FitzRoy Somerset, Marquess of Worcester
- Remainder to: 1st Duke's heirs male of the body lawfully begotten
- Subsidiary titles: Marquess of Worcester; Earl of Worcester; Earl of Glamorgan (courtesy); Viscount Grosmont (courtesy)
- Seat: Badminton House (since the 17th century)
- Former seat: Raglan Castle (until 1646)
- Motto: Mutare vel timere sperno (Latin for 'I scorn to change or to fear')

Duke of Beaufort (/ˈboʊfət/ BOH-fət) is a title in the Peerage of England. It was created by Charles II in 1682 for Henry Somerset, 3rd Marquess of Worcester, a descendant of Charles Somerset, 1st Earl of Worcester, legitimised son of Henry Beaufort, 3rd Duke of Somerset, a Lancastrian leader in the Wars of the Roses. The name Beaufort refers to a castle in Champagne, France (now Montmorency-Beaufort). It is the only current dukedom to take its name from a place outside the British Isles.

The Dukes of Beaufort descend in the male line from the House of Plantagenet through John of Gaunt, son of Edward III. This statement was challenged after the analysis of the Y chromosomal DNA of the remains of Richard III. Most living male heirs of the 5th Duke of Beaufort were found to carry a relatively common Y chromosome type, which is different from the rare lineage found in Richard III's remains. The instance of false paternity could have occurred anywhere in the numerous generations separating Richard III from the 5th Duke of Beaufort. The break also could have occurred with Richard III's grandfather Richard of Conisburgh, whose paternity has been called into question although he was acknowledged by his father.

Beaufort Castle was in possession of John of Gaunt, and the surname Beaufort was given to Gaunt's four legitimised children by his mistress and third wife, Katherine Swynford. This was the foundation of the House of Beaufort, Dukes of Somerset. A descendant of the Beauforts through his mother was Henry VII of England. Charles Somerset, 1st Earl of Worcester, KG (c. 1460 – 15 March 1526), was the bastard son of Henry Beaufort, 3rd Duke of Somerset by his mistress Joan Hill.

The Duke of Beaufort holds two subsidiary titles – Marquess of Worcester (created 1642) and Earl of Worcester (created 1514). The title of Marquess of Worcester is used as a courtesy title by the duke's eldest son and heir. The title of Earl of Glamorgan is used by the eldest son of the heir apparent to the dukedom. The Earl of Glamorgan's eldest son is known as Viscount Grosmont. The Earldom of Glamorgan and Viscountcy of Grosmont derive from an irregular creation in 1644 by Charles I in favour of Edward Somerset, who later succeeded his father as 2nd Marquess of Worcester.

Although the Earldom of Glamorgan and Viscountcy of Grosmont were not recognised as substantive titles at the restoration of Charles II, because of irregularities in the patent of creation, they have nevertheless continued to be used as convenient courtesy titles in order to distinguish the bearer from the Marquess of Worcester as heir apparent, the Earldom of Worcester not being distinctive enough for this purpose. All subsidiary titles are in the Peerage of England.

Field Marshal The Lord Raglan, born Lord FitzRoy Somerset (1788–1855), was the youngest son of the fifth duke.

== Family seat and estates ==
=== Country seats ===
The family seat was Raglan Castle in Monmouthshire until 1646, after which it became Badminton House near Chipping Sodbury in Gloucestershire. The principal burial place of the Dukes and Duchesses of Beaufort is St Michael and All Angels' Church, Badminton.

Following the creation of the dukedom, each successive duke has served as Master of the Duke of Beaufort's Hunt, a foxhound pack kenneled on the Badminton Estate.

=== Estates ===
In the 1883 edition of John Bateman's The Great Landowners of Great Britain and Ireland, Henry Somerset, 8th Duke of Beaufort's estates were recorded as spanning 51,085 acres across England and Wales, including 27,299 acres in Monmouthshire, 16,610 acres in Gloucestershire, 4,019 acres in Brecknockshire, 1,218 acres in Glamorgan, and 1,939 acres in Wiltshire, which produced a combined annual income of £56,226.

=== London residences ===
In 1738 Henry Somerset-Scudamore, 3rd Duke of Beaufort purchased the lease of No. 33 Upper Grosvenor Street (later the site of Grosvenor House) from John Chetwynd, 2nd Viscount Chetwynd for £8,000; this remained as his London house until his death in 1745.

His brother Charles Somerset, 4th Duke of Beaufort inherited the lease and continued to use 33 Upper Grosvenor Street as his London residence until his death in 1756, after which his widow Elizabeth Somerset, Duchess of Beaufort and son Henry Somerset, 5th Duke of Beaufort continued to live at the house. The 5th Duke later sold the lease of the house, as well as most of its contents, to Prince William, Duke of Cumberland for £15,865 in 1761.

The 5th Duke subsequently leased No. 5 Grosvenor Square from 1768, which remained as his London residence until his death in 1803. The lease was then inherited by his son Henry Somerset, 6th Duke of Beaufort, who had previously leased No. 54 Grosvenor Street from 1793 until his father’s death. The 6th Duke retained 5 Grosvenor Square as his London residence until his death in 1835.

Henry Somerset, 7th Duke of Beaufort purchased No. 22 Arlington Street from John Pratt, 1st Marquess Camden in 1840, and employed the architect Owen Jones to undertake an extensive renovation of the house, which became known as Beaufort House. In 1852 the 7th Duke sold the Beaufort House to William Hamilton, 11th Duke of Hamilton for £60,000. Following the 7th Duke’s death in 1853, he was succeeded by his son Charles Somerset, 8th Duke of Beaufort. Prior to his father’s death the 8th Duke had leased No. 27 Berkeley Square in 1846, which he retained until 1855; during the second half of the nineteenth century he proceeded to lease a series of London homes on a short term basis for the London season, including No. 22 Grosvenor Square in 1856, Warwick House in 1875, and No. 11 Portman Square in 1877.

His son Henry Somerset, Marquess of Worcester leased No. 28 St James's Place for the 1897 London season. Following the death of the 8th Duke in April 1899, Henry Somerset, 9th Duke of Beaufort took a short lease of a house in Brook Street, Mayfair from Augusta, Lady Delamere (widow of Hugh Cholmondeley, 2nd Baron Delamere). The 9th Duke continued to lease various houses on a short-term basis during the early 20th century, including No. 19 Curzon Street in 1900, 50 Grosvenor Street in 1901, No. 17 Hill Street in 1902, No. 17 Park Lane in 1903 from Blanche, Dowager Countess of Rosslyn, and No. 31 Bruton Street in 1905. The 9th Duke later purchased the lease of No. 11 Portman Square in 1907, which continued to be the family’s London home until c. 1918.

Henry Somerset, 10th Duke of Beaufort, who served in the Royal Household as Master of Horse from 1936 until 1978, was granted Apartment 7, Kensington Palace as a grace-and-favour residence in 1953, which he and his wife Mary, Duchess of Beaufort retained as their London residence until c. 1979.

Following the 10th Duke's death in 1984 he was succeeded by his first-cousin-twice-removed David Robert Somerset, 11th Duke of Beaufort. Prior to his accession, the 11th Duke had lived at No. 80 Eaton Terrace, Belgravia since the early 1950s, which continued to be his London residence during the mid-2010s.

== Descent from John of Gaunt ==
- John of Gaunt, son of King Edward III and father of King Henry IV of England
- John Beaufort, 1st Earl of Somerset, natural and legitimized son of John of Gaunt by Katherine Swynford
- Edmund Beaufort, 4th Earl and 2nd Duke of Somerset, fourth and youngest son of the 1st Earl
- Henry Beaufort, 3rd Duke of Somerset, son of the 4th Earl and 2nd Duke of Somerset; his natural son was created Earl of Worcester in 1514.

== Earls of Worcester (1514) ==
- Charles Somerset, 1st Earl of Worcester (c. 1450–1526), legitimised son of Henry Beaufort, 3rd Duke of Somerset and Joan Hill

Other titles (2nd onwards): Baron Herbert (1461)

- Henry Somerset, 2nd Earl of Worcester (c. 1495–1548), only legitimate son of the 1st Earl
- William Somerset, 3rd Earl of Worcester (died 1589), eldest son of the 2nd Earl
- Edward Somerset, 4th Earl of Worcester (1553–1628), only son of the 3rd Earl, was the father of the 5th Earl and Lady Blanche Arundell
- Henry Somerset, 5th Earl of Worcester (1577–1646) was created Marquess of Worcester in 1643

== Marquesses of Worcester (1642) ==
Other titles: Earl of Worcester (1514) and Baron Herbert (1461)

- Henry Somerset, 1st Marquess of Worcester (1577–1646), eldest son of the 4th Earl, was a noted Cavalier
- Edward Somerset, 2nd Marquess of Worcester (1601–1667), eldest son of the 1st Marquess, was an inventor. He has a claim to the invention of the steam engine.
- Henry Somerset, 3rd Marquess of Worcester (1629–1700) was created Duke of Beaufort in 1682, after the Restoration
  - Henry Somerset, Lord Herbert (b. bef. 1660), eldest son of the 3rd Marquess, died in infancy

== Dukes of Beaufort (1682) ==
Other titles: Marquesses of Worcester (1642) and Earl of Worcester (1514)
Other titles (1st–10th Dukes): Baron Herbert (1461)

- Henry Somerset, 1st Duke of Beaufort (1629–1700), eldest son of the 2nd Marquess
  - Henry Somerset, Lord Herbert (b. before 1660), eldest son of the 1st Duke, died in infancy
  - Charles Somerset, Marquess of Worcester (1660–1698), second son of the 1st Duke, predeceased his father
- Henry Somerset, 2nd Duke of Beaufort (1684–1714), only son of the Marquess of Worcester
- Henry Scudamore, 3rd Duke of Beaufort (1707–1745), eldest son of the 2nd Duke, died without issue
- Charles Noel Somerset, 4th Duke of Beaufort (1709–1756), second and youngest son of the 2nd Duke

Other titles (5th–10th Dukes): Baron Botetourt (1305; abeyance ended 1803)

- Henry Somerset, 5th Duke of Beaufort (1744–1803), only son of the 4th Duke
- Henry Charles Somerset, 6th Duke of Beaufort (1766–1835), eldest son of the 5th Duke
- Henry Somerset, 7th Duke of Beaufort (1792–1853), eldest son of the 6th Duke
- Henry Charles FitzRoy Somerset, 8th Duke of Beaufort (1824–1899), only son of the 7th Duke
- Henry Adelbert Wellington FitzRoy Somerset, 9th Duke of Beaufort (1847–1924), eldest son of the 8th Duke
- Henry Hugh Arthur FitzRoy Somerset, 10th Duke of Beaufort (1900–1984), only son of the 9th Duke, died without issue, at which point his two Baronies fell into abeyance.
- David Robert Somerset, 11th Duke of Beaufort (1928–2017), great-grandson of Rt. Hon. Lord Henry Richard Charles Somerset, second son of the 8th Duke
- Henry John FitzRoy Somerset, 12th Duke of Beaufort (b. 22 May 1952), eldest son of the 11th Duke.

The heir apparent is the present holder's son, Henry Robert FitzRoy Somerset, Marquess of Worcester (b. 20 January 1989).

Line of succession (simplified)
- Henry Somerset, 5th Duke of Beaufort (1744–1803)
  - Henry Somerset, 6th Duke of Beaufort (1766–1835)
    - Henry Somerset, 7th Duke of Beaufort (1792–1853)
      - Henry Somerset, 8th Duke of Beaufort (1824–1899)
        - Henry Somerset, 9th Duke of Beaufort (1847–1924)
          - Henry Somerset, 10th Duke of Beaufort (1900–1984)
        - Lord Henry Somerset (1849–1932)
          - Henry Charles Somers Augustus Somerset (1874–1945)
            - Henry Robert Somers FitzRoy de Vere Somerset (1898–1965)
              - David Somerset, 11th Duke of Beaufort (1928–2017)
                - Henry Somerset, 12th Duke of Beaufort (born 1952)
                  - (1). Henry Robert FitzRoy Somerset, Marquess of Worcester (born 1989)
                    - (2). Henry, Earl of Glamorgan (born 2021)
                    - (3). Lord Jack Somerset (born 2024)
                  - (4). Lord Alexander Lorne Somerset (born 1995)
                - (5). Lord John Robert Somerset (born 1964)
                  - (6). Lyle David Somerset (born 1991)
  - Lord Charles Somerset (1767–1831)
    - Henry Somerset (1794–1862)
      - Charles Henry Somerset (1819–1863)
        - Henry Plantagenet Somerset (1852–1936)
          - Charles William Henry Rollo Somerset (1895–1936)
            - male issue in line
          - Hereward Henry Plantagenet Somerset (1900–1989)
            - male issue in line
      - Henry George Edward Somerset (1829–1920)
        - Charles Wyndham Somerset (1862–1938)
          - Alan FitzRoy Somerset (1902–1940)
            - male issue in line
      - FitzRoy MacLean Henry Somerset (1839–1907)
        - FitzRoy Henry Somerset (1881–1946)
          - Raglan Henry Somerset (1903–1981)
            - Eugene Somerset (1929–1993)
              - male issue in line
            - John FitzRoy Somerset (1933–2003)
              - male issue in line
          - Harry Edward Somerset (1914–1991)
            - male issue in line
    - Poulett George Henry Somerset (1822–1875)
      - Vere Francis John Somerset (1854–1909)
        - William Francis Somerset (1876–1942)
          - Lionel Francis Somerset (1903–1981)
            - male issue in line
        - Charles Somerset (1878–1941)
          - Henry Charles Fitzroy Somerset (1919–2006)
            - male issue in line
  - Lord Arthur John Henry Somerset (1780–1816)
    - George Henry Somerset (1809–1882)
      - FitzRoy John Henry Somerset (1851–after 1875)
        - any legitimate male issue and heirs in the male line
  - Lord William Somerset (1784–1851)
    - Henry Charles Capel Somerset (1816–1905)
      - FitzRoy William Henry Somerset (1845–1878)
        - Raglan Somerset (1872–1940)
          - FitzRoy Raglan Somerset (1901–1985)
            - Raglan FitzRoy Somerset (1925–2002)
              - male issue in line
    - William Somerset (1822–1902)
      - Charles Edward Henry Somerset (1862–1939)
        - William Raglan Henry Guy Somerset (1912–1981)
          - William Michael John Charles Somerset (1934–2007)
            - male issue in line
    - FitzRoy Molyneux Henry Somerset (1823–1901)
      - Arthur William FitzRoy Somerset (1855–1937)
        - Arthur Plantagenet Francis Cecil Somerset (1889–1957)
          - John FitzRoy Pechell Somerset (1923–2019)
            - male issue in line
    - Rev. Boscawen Thomas George Henry Somerset (1833–1893)
      - William Horace Boscawen Somerset (1880–1946)
        - FitzRoy Douglas Boscawen Somerset (1923–2019)
          - male issue in line
  - FitzRoy Somerset, 1st Baron Raglan (1788–1855)
    - Barons Raglan

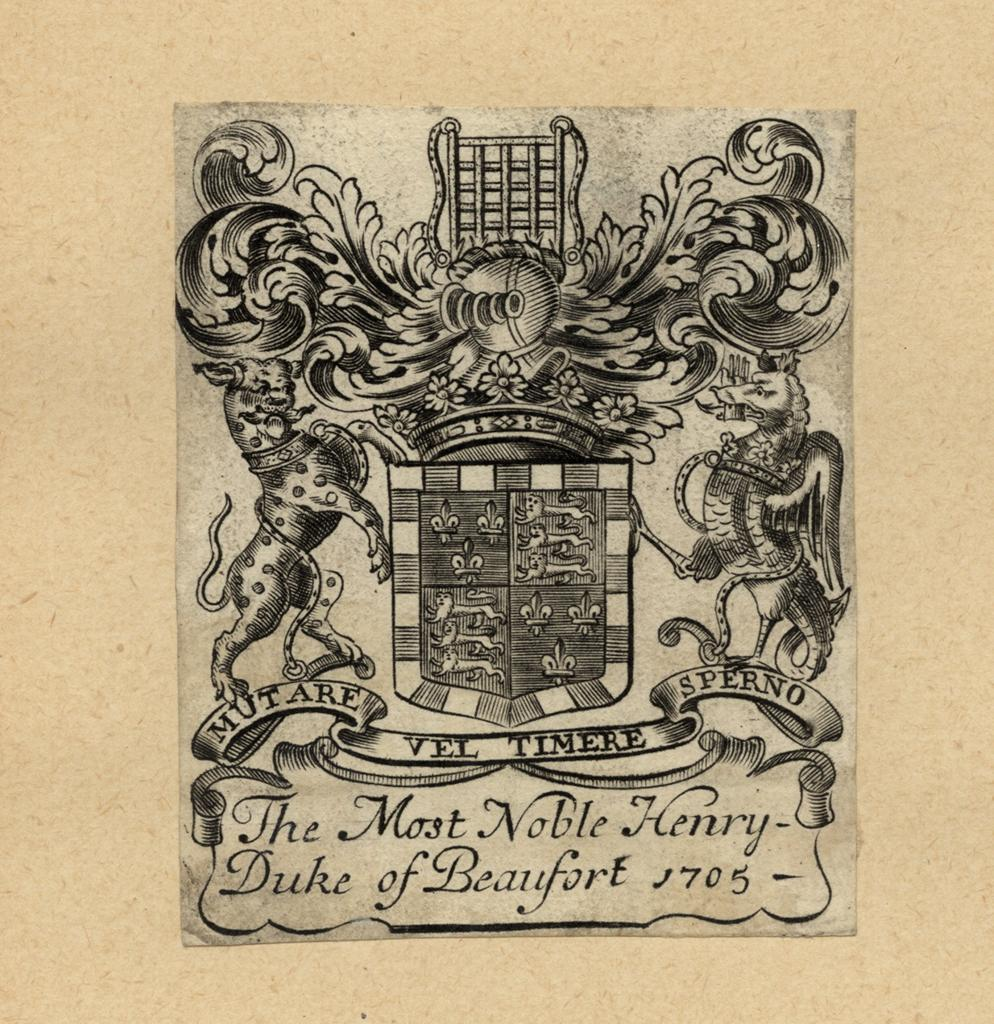
Bookplate with the arms of the 2nd Duke of Beaufort

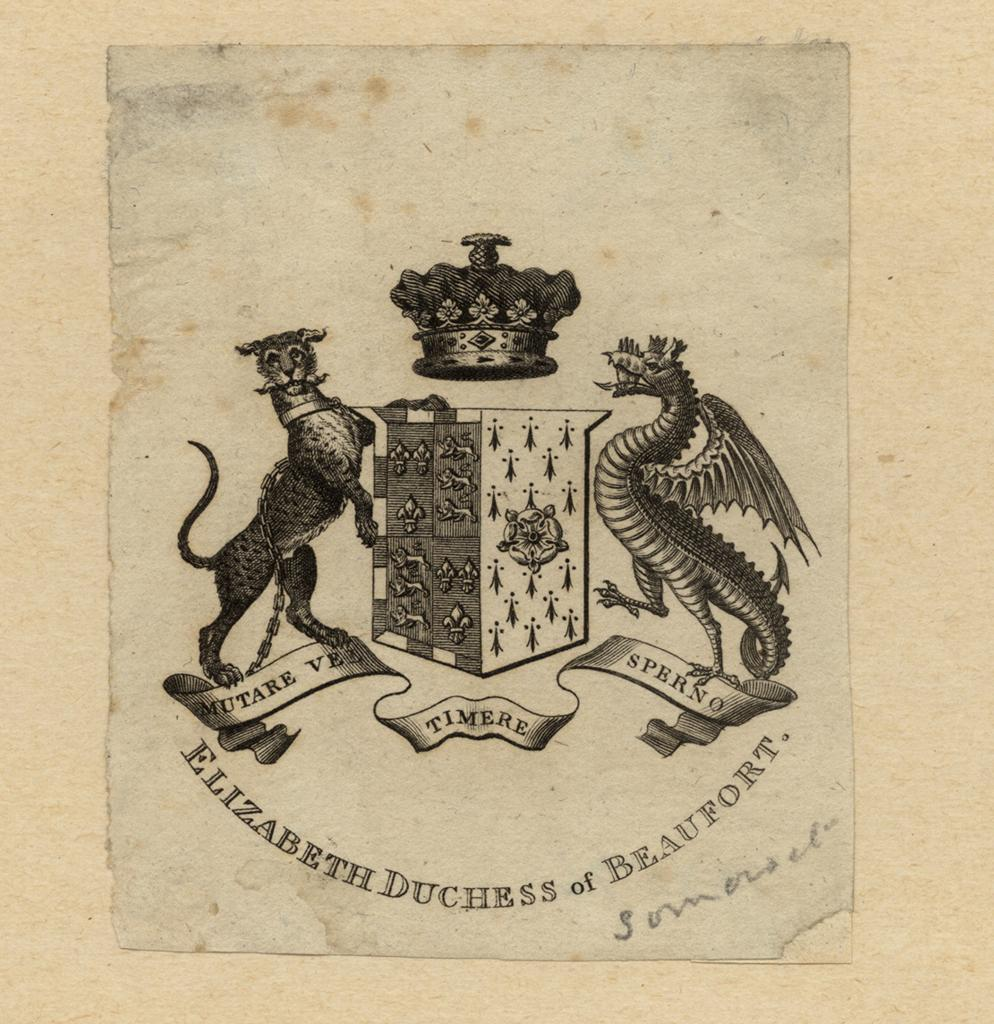
Bookplate with the arms of Elizabeth Somerset, wife of the 5th Duke of Beaufort

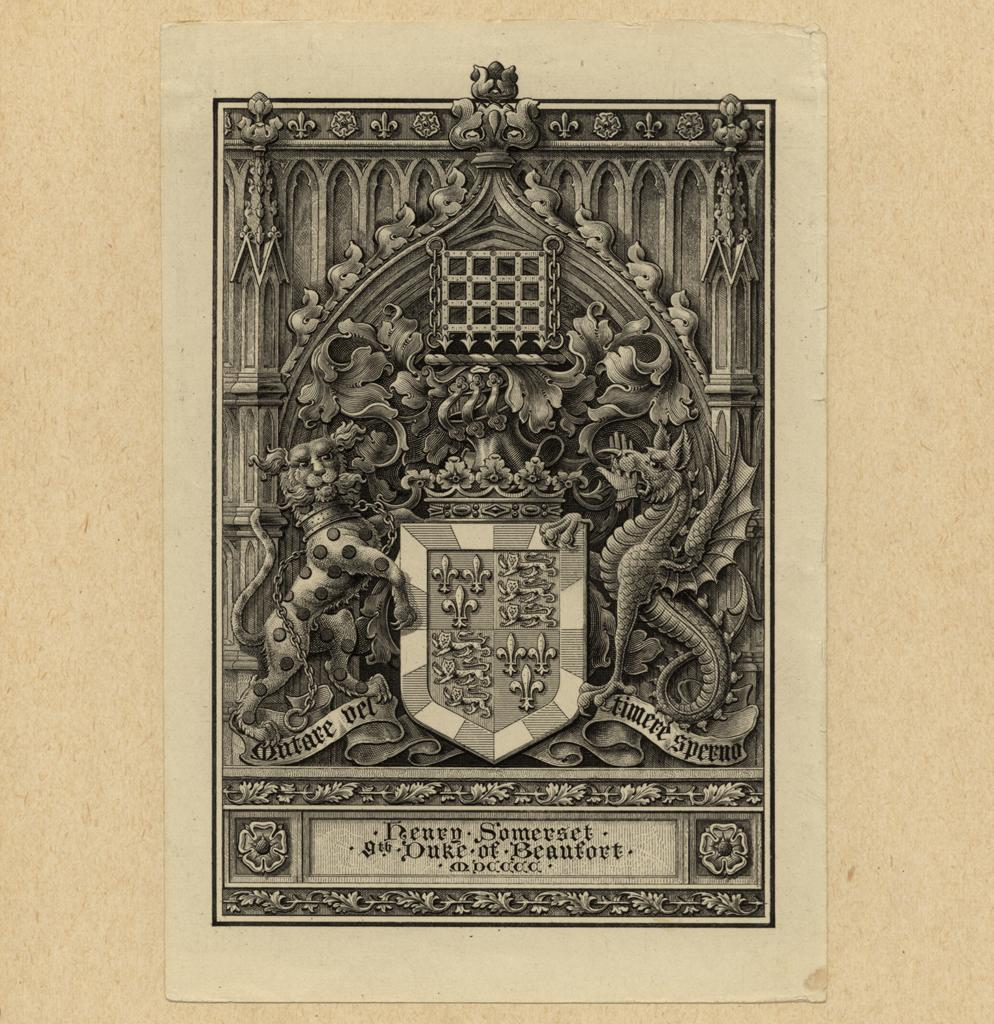
Bookplate with the arms of the 9th Duke of Beaufort

== Coat of arms ==
The heraldic blazon for the coat of arms of the dukedom is: Quarterly, 1st and 4th, azure three fleurs-de-lys or (for France); 2nd and 3rd, gules three lions passant guardant in pale or (for England), all within a bordure compony argent and azure.

This can be translated as: a shield divided into quarters, the top left and bottom right quarters are blue with three golden fleurs-de-lys (for France), and the top right and bottom left quarters are red with three golden lions passant with their faces toward the viewer, one above the other (for England); the foregoing quarters are within a border around the shield with segments alternating white and blue.

In heraldry, a bordure compony is traditionally used to designate illegitimacy. Since the original Beaufort siblings' father was of the English royal family, the English royal arms are used. At that time, the king of England also claimed the French crown, hence the inclusion of the French royal arms.

Coat of arms of the Duke of Beaufort
Coronet Coronet of a Duke Crest On a wreath, a portcullis, Or nailed Azure, chains pendant thereto of the first, which the family bears in memory of John of Gaunt's castle of Beaufort, before mentioned. Antiently the crest was a panther, Argent, diversely spotted, and gorged with a ducal coronet, Or. Escutcheon Quarterly, 1st and 4th, azure three fleurs-de-lys or (for France); 2nd and 3rd, gules three lions passant guardant in pale or (for England), all within a bordure compony argent and azure Supporters On the dexter side a panther, Argent, spotted with various colours, fire issuing out of his mouth and ears proper, gorged with a collar, and chain pendant, Or: on the sinister, a wyvern, vert, holding in his mouth a sinister hand coupé at the wrist proper [alias gules]. Motto Mutare vel timere sperno

== Family tree ==
Peerage family tree of the Dukes of Beaufort, Lancaster, and Somerset and subsidiary titles

Earl of Dorset (possibly 1st creation), 1070
Roger de Beaumont c. 1015–1094	Saint Osmund d. 1099; Bishop of Salisbury and possibly Earl of Dorset
Earl of Dorset (1st creation) discontinued, 1099
Earl of Leicester (1st creation), 1107
King Henry I c. 1068–1135	King Stephen; 1092/1096–1154	Robert de Beaumont c. 1040/1050–1118; 1st Earl of Leicester	Henry de Beaumont d. 1119; Earl of Warwick
Earl of Worcester (1st creation), 1138
Robert FitzRoy c. 1090–1147; Earl of Gloucester	Matilda (d. bef. 1141)	Waleran de Beaumont; 1104–1166; Earl of Worcester	Robert de Beaumont; 1104–1168; 2nd Earl of Leicester	Hugh de Beaumont b. 1106; Earl of Bedford
Earldom of Worcester (1st creation) extinct, 1166
William FitzRobert; 1116–1183; Earl of Gloucester	Hawise de Beaumont	Robert de Beaumont d. 1190; 3rd Earl of Leicester
Robert de Beaumont d. 1204; 4th Earl of Leicester	Amice; Countess of Rochefort
King John; 1166–1216	Isabella; 1173/1174–1217; Countess of Gloucester	Simon de Montfort c. 1175–1218; 5th Earl of Leicester
King Henry III; 1207–1272	Eleanor of England	Simon de Montfort c. 1208–1265; 6th Earl of Leicester
Earldom of Leicester (1st creation) forfeited, 1265
Earl of Leicester (2nd creation), 1267; Earl of Lancaster, 1276
King Edward I 1239–1307	Edmund Crouchback; 1245–1296; 1st Earl of Leicester, 1st Earl of Lancaster
Earldom of Leicester (2nd creation) restored, 1324; Earldom of Lancaster restored, 1327
King Edward II; 1284–1327	Thomas of Lancaster; 1278–1322; 2nd Earl of Leicester, 2nd Earl of Lancaster	Henry of Lancaster; 1281–1345; 3rd Earl of Leicester, 3rd Earl of Lancaster
Earldom of Leicester (2nd creation) and Earldom of Lancaster forfeited, 1322
Duke of Lancaster, 1351
King Edward III; 1312–1377	Henry of Grosmont c. 1310–1361; Duke of Lancaster, 4th Earl of Lancaster, 4th Earl of Leicester	Joan of Lancaster c. 1312–1349 m. John (II) de Mowbray; 1310–1361; Baron Mowbray	Eleanor of Lancaster; 1318–1372	Mary of Lancaster c. 1320–1362
Earl of Worcester (2nd creation), 1397
John of Gaunt; 1340–1399; Duke of Lancaster, 5th Earl of Lancaster, (6th) Earl of Leicester jure uxoris Earl of Richmond	Blanche of Lancaster; 1342–1368; 5th Countess of Lancaster, (6th) Countess of Leicester	Maud of Lancaster; 1340–1362 a.k.a. Matilda, Countess of Hainault	William; 1330–1389; Duke of Bavaria and Count of Holland, (5th) Earl of Leicester jure uxoris	Richard Fitzalan; 1346–1397; Earl of Arundel	Thomas Percy; 1343–1403; Earl of Worcester
Earldom of Worcester (2nd creation) extinct, 1403
Eleanor Mowbray d. bef. 1387 m. Roger La Warr; 1326–1370
Earl of Somerset (1st creation), 1397; Marquess of Somerset and Marquess of Dorset (1st creation), 1397	Earl of Dorset (2nd creation), 1411
Henry Bolingbroke; 1367–1413; Duke of Lancaster, (7th) Earl of Leicester later King Henry IV	John Beaufort c. 1373–1410; Marquess of Somerset, Marquess of Dorset, 1st Earl of Somerset	Thomas Beaufort c. 1377–1426; Duke of Exeter, Earl of Dorset	Joan Beaufort c. 1379–1440	Joan La Warr m. Thomas West; 1365–1405; Baron West	Joan de Beauchamp; 1375–1435
Earldom of Leicester (2nd creation) and Dukedom of Lancaster merged into the Crown, 1399	Marquessate of Somerset and Marquessate of Dorset (1st creation) revoked, 1399	Earldom of Dorset (2nd creation) extinct, 1426
Duke of Lancaster, 1399	Earl of Worcester (3rd creation), 1421
Henry of Monmouth; 1386–1422; Duke of Lancaster later King Henry V	Richard Beauchamp; 1394–c. 1422; Earl of Worcester	Reginald West; 1395–1450; Baron De La Warr and Baron West
Dukedom of Lancaster merged into the Crown, 1413	Earldom of Worcester (3rd creation) extinct, 1422
Duke of Somerset (1st creation), 1443	Earl of Dorset (3rd creation), 1442; Marquess of Dorset (2nd creation), 1443; Duke of Somerset (2nd creation), 1448
Henry Beaufort; 1401–1418; 2nd Earl of Somerset	John Beaufort; 1404–1444; 1st Duke of Somerset, 3rd Earl of Somerset	Edmund Beaufort; 1406–1455; 2nd Duke of Somerset, 1st Marquess of Dorset, etc., 4th Earl of Somerset	Richard Neville; 1400–1460; Earl of Salisbury	Edward Neville d. 1476; Baron Bergavenny	Elizabeth Beauchamp; 1415–1448	Richard West; 1430–1476; Baron De La Warr, Baron West
Dukedom of Somerset (1st creation) extinct, 1444
Claimed titles here are disputed	Earl of Worcester (4th creation), 1449
Margaret Beaufort; 1443–1509	Elizabeth Woodville c. 1437–1492	Henry Beaufort; 1436–1464; 3rd Duke of Somerset, 2nd Marquess of Dorset, 5th Earl of Dorset	Edmund Beaufort c. 1438–1471; 4th Duke of Somerset, 3rd Marquess of Dorset, 6th Earl of Dorset	Cecily Neville c. 1425–1450	John Tiptoft; 1427–1470; 1st Earl of Worcester
Dukedom of Somerset (2nd creation), Marquessate of Dorset (2nd creation), and Earldom of Dorset attained, 1461, but possibly restored (disputed), 1463	Dukedom of Somerset (2nd creation), Marquessate of Dorset (2nd creation), and Earldom of Dorset extinct, 1471	Earldom of Worcester (4th creation) attainted, 1470
Thomas West c. 1457–1525; Baron De La Warr, Baron West
Marquess of Dorset (3rd creation), 1475	Earl of Worcester (5th creation), 1514	Earl of Worcester (4th creation) restored, 1471
Margery Wentworth c. 1478–1550	King Henry VII; 1457–1509	Elizabeth of York; 1466–1503	Thomas Grey; 1451–1501; 1st Marquess of Dorset	Charles Somerset c. 1460–1526; 1st Earl of Worcester	Elizabeth Somerset c. 1476–1507; 3rd Baroness Herbert suo jure	Edward Tiptoft c. 1469–1485; 2nd Earl of Worcester	Eleanor West b. 1481 m. Edward Guildford c. 1474–1534
Earldom of Worcester (4th creation) extinct, 1485
Viscount Beauchamp "of Hache" (1st creation), 1536; Earl of Hertford (2nd creation), 1537; Duke of Somerset (4th creation), 1547	Duke of Somerset (3rd creation), 1499
Edward Seymour c. 1500–1552; Duke of Somerset, Earl of Hertford, etc.	Jane Seymour c. 1508–1537	King Henry VIII; 1491–1547	Thomas Grey; 1477–1530; 2nd Marquess of Dorset	Henry Somerset c. 1495–1548; 2nd Earl of Worcester, 4th Baron Herbert	Mary Tudor; 1496–1533; Queen of France; Duchess of Suffolk	Edmund Tudor; 1499–1500; 1st Duke of Somerset	Jane Guildford c. 1508/1509–1555 m. John Dudley; 1504–1553; Duke of Northumberland
Dukedom of Somerset (4th creation), Earldom of Hertford (2nd creation), and Viscountcy Beauchamp (1st creation) forfeit, 1552	Dukedom of Somerset (3rd creation) extinct, 1500
Duke of Richmond and Somerset, 1525
King Edward VI; 1537–1553	Henry Fitzroy; 1519–1536; 1st Duke of Richmond and Somerset	Henry Grey; 1517–1554; Duke of Suffolk, 3rd Marquess of Dorset	Frances Brandon; 1517–1559; Duchess of Suffolk
Dukedom of Richmond and Somerset extinct, 1536	Marquessate of Dorset (3rd creation) attainted and honours forfeit, 1554
Earl of Hertford (3rd creation) and Viscount Beauchamp "of Hache" (2nd creation), 1559	Earl of Leicester (3rd creation), 1564	Baron Buckhurst (1st creation), 1567; Earl of Dorset (4th creation), 1604
Edward Seymour c. 1528–1593	Edward Seymour; 1539–1621; Earl of Hertford, etc.	Katherine Grey; 1540–1568	William Somerset c. 1526–1589; 3rd Earl of Worcester, 5th Baron Herbert	John Dudley c. 1527–1554; Earl of Warwick	Robert Dudley; 1532–1588; 1st Earl of Leicester	Mary Dudley c. 1530–1586 m. Henry Sidney	Guildford Dudley c. 1535–1554	Jane Grey; 1537–1554; Disputed Queen of England	Thomas Sackville; 1536–1608; 1st Earl of Dorset, etc.
Earldom of Hertford (3rd creation) forfeit, 1552	Earldom of Leicester (3rd creation) extinct, 1588
Seymour baronets, of Berry Pomeroy, 1611	Earl of Leicester (4th creation), 1618
Edward Seymour c. 1563–1613; 1st Baronet	Edward Seymour; 1561–1612; Viscount Beauchamp	Edward Somerset; 1553–1628; 4th Earl of Worcester, 6th Baron Herbert	Philip Sidney; 1554–1586	Mary Sidney; 1561–1621	Robert Sidney; 1563–1626; 1st Earl of Leicester	Robert Sackville; 1561–1609; 2nd Earl of Dorset, etc.
Marquess of Hertford (1st creation), 1641; Duke of Somerset (4th creation restored), 1660	Baron Seymour of Trowbridge, 1641	Marquess of Worcester, 1642	Viscount Somerset of Cashel, 1626	Viscount Rochester, 1611; Earl of Somerset (3rd creation), 1613
Edward Seymour c. 1580–1659; 2nd Baronet	William Seymour; 1588–1660; 2nd Duke of Somerset, 1st Marquess of Hertford, 2nd Earl of Hertford	Francis Seymour c. 1590–1664; 1st Lord Seymour of Trowbridge	Henry Somerset; 1577–1646; 1st Marquess of Worcester, 5th Earl of Worcester, 7th Baron Herbert	Thomas Somerset; 1579–1651; Viscount Somerset	Robert Sidney; 1595–1677; 2nd Earl of Leicester	Richard Sackville; 1589–1624; 3rd Earl of Dorset, etc.	Edward Sackville; 1591–1652; 4th Earl of Dorset, etc.	Robert Carr c. 1587–1645; Earl of Somerset, etc.
Viscountcy Somerset extinct, 1651	Earldom of Somerset (3rd creation) and Viscountcy Rochester extinct, 1645
Edward Seymour; 1610–1688; 3rd Baronet	Henry Seymour c. 1626–1654; Lord Beauchamp	Charles Seymour c. 1621–1665; 2nd Lord Seymour of Trowbridge	Edward Somerset; 1601–1667; 2nd Marquess of Worcester, 6th Earl of Worcester, 8th Baron Herbert	Philip Sidney; 1619–1698; 3rd Earl of Leicester	Algernon Sidney; 1623–1683	Lucy Sidney; 1630–1685	Henry Sidney; 1641–1704; Earl of Romney	Richard Sackville; 1522–1677; 5th Earl of Dorset, etc.
Duke of Beaufort, 1682	Baron Cranfield, 1674; Earl of Middlesex (2nd creation), 1675
Edward Seymour; 1633–1708; 4th Baronet	William Seymour; 1650–1671; 3rd Duke of Somerset, 2nd Marquess of Hertford, 3rd Earl of Hertford	John Seymour c. 1646–1675; 4th Duke of Somerset, 3rd Marquess of Hertford, 4th Earl of Hertford	Francis Seymour; 1658–1678; 5th Duke of Somerset, 3rd Lord Seymour of Trowbridge	Charles Seymour; 1662–1748; 6th Duke of Somerset	Henry Somerset; 1629–1700; 1st Duke of Beaufort, 3rd Marquess of Worcester, 7th Earl of Worcester, 9th Baron Herbert	Robert Sidney; 1649–1702; 4th Earl of Leicester	Thomas Pelham; 1653–1712	Charles Sackville; 1522–1677; 6th Earl of Dorset, etc., 1st Earl of Middlesex, etc.
Marquessate of Hertford (1st creation) extinct, 1675
Baron Conway of Ragley, 1703; Baron Conway of Killultagh, 1712	Duke of Dorset, 1720
Edward Seymour; 1663–1740; 5th Baronet	Francis Seymour-Conway; 1679–1732; 1st Baron Conway	Edward Coke d. 1707	Algernon Seymour; 1684–1750; 7th Duke of Somerset, Earl of Northumberland	Charles Somerset; 1660–1698 styled Marquess of Worcester	Philip Sidney; 1676–1705; 5th Earl of Leicester	John Sidney; 1680–1737; 6th Earl of Leicester	Jocelyn Sidney; 1682–1743; 7th Earl of Leicester	Elizabeth Pelham; 1681–1711	Lionel Sackville; 1688–1765; 1st Duke of Dorset, 7th Earl of Dorset, etc., 2nd Earl of Middlesex, etc.
Earldom of Leicester (4th creation) extinct, 1743
Baron Lovel, of Minster Lovel, 1728; Earl of Leicester (5th creation) and Viscount Coke, 1744
Edward Seymour; 1695–1757; 8th Duke of Somerset; 6th Baronet	Anne Coke	Thomas Coke; 1697–1759; Earl of Leicester, etc.	Henry Somerset; 1684–1714; 2nd Duke of Beaufort, 4th Marquess of Worcester, 8th Earl of Worcester, 10th Baron Herbert	Charles Townshend; 1700–1764; Viscount Townshend
Earl of Hertford (4th creation) and Viscount Beauchamp (2nd creation), 1850; Marquess of Hertford (2nd creation) and Earl of Yarmouth (3rd creation), 1793	Earldom of Leicester (5th creation) and subsidiary titles extinct, 1759	Viscount Sackville and Baron Bolebrooke, 1782
Edward Seymour; 1717–1792; 9th Duke of Somerset	Webb Seymour; 1718–1793; 10th Duke of Somerset	Francis Seymour; 1726–1799	Francis Seymour-Conway; 1718–1794; 1st Marquess of Hertford, etc., 2nd Baron Conway	Wenman (Roberts) Coke c. 1717–1776	Henry Somerset-Scudamore; 1707–1745; 3rd Duke of Beaufort, 5th Marquess of Worcester, 9th Earl of Worcester, 11th Baron Herbert	Charles Noel Somerset; 1709–1756; 4th Duke of Beaufort, 6th Marquess of Worcester, 10th Earl of Worcester, 12th Baron Herbert	George Townshend; 1724–1807; Marquess Townshend	Charles Sackville; 1711–1769; 2nd Duke of Dorset, 8th Earl of Dorset, etc., 3rd Earl of Middlesex, etc.	John Sackville; 1713–1765	George Germain; 1716–1785; 1st Viscount Sackville, etc.
Earl of Leicester (7th creation) and Viscount Coke (2nd creation), 1837	Baron Botetourt abeyance terminated, 1803	Earl of Leicester (6th creation), 1784
Francis Compton Seymour d. 1822	Francis Ingram-Seymour-Conway; 1743–1822; 2nd Marquess of Hertford, etc., 3rd Baron Conway	Hugh Seymour; 1759–1801	Thomas William Coke; 1754–1842; 1st Earl of Leicester, etc.	Henry Somerset; 1744–1803; 5th Duke of Beaufort, 7th Marquess of Worcester, 11th Earl of Worcester, 13th Baron Herbert, 5th Baron Botetourt	George Townshend; 1753–1811; 2nd Marquess Townshend, 1st Earl of Leicester	John Frederick Sackville; 1745–1799; 3rd Duke of Dorset, 9th Earl of Dorset, etc., 4th Earl of Middlesex, etc.
Baron Raglan, 1852
Edward Adolphus St Maur; 1775–1855; 11th Duke of Somerset	Francis Charles Seymour-Conway; 1777–1842; 3rd Marquess of Hertford, etc., 4th Baron Conway	George Seymour; 1787–1870	Henry Charles Somerset; 1766–1835; 6th Duke of Beaufort, 8th Marquess of Worcester, 12th Earl of Worcester, 14th Baron Herbert, 6th Baron Botetourt	FitzRoy James Henry Somerset; 1788–1855; 1st Baron Raglan	George Townshend; 1778–1855; 3rd Marquess Townshend, 2nd Earl of Leicester	George John Frederick Sackville; 1793–1815; 4th Duke of Dorset, 10th Earl of Dorset, etc., 5th Earl of Middlesex, etc.	John Frederick Sackville; 1767–1843; 5th Duke of Dorset, 11th Earl of Dorset, 6th Earl of Middlesex, etc., 2nd Viscount Sackville, etc.
Earldom of Leicester (6th creation) extinct, 1855	Dukedom of Dorset, Earldoms of Dorset (4th creation) and Middlesex (2nd creation), Viscountcy of Sackville, Baronies of Buckhurst (1st creation), Cranfield, and Bolebrooke extinct, 1843
Francis Edward Seymour; 1788–1866	Richard Seymour-Conway; 1800–1870; 4th Marquess of Hertford, etc., 5th Baron Conway	Francis George Hugh Seymour; 1812–1884; 5th Marquess of Hertford, etc., 6th Baron Conway	Henry Somerset; 1792–1853; 7th Duke of Beaufort, 9th Marquess of Worcester, 13th Earl of Worcester, 15th Baron Herbert, 7th Baron Botetourt
Earl St. Maur, 1863
Edward Adolphus St Maur; 1804–1885; 12th Duke of Somerset	Archibald Henry Algernon St Maur; 1810–1891; 13th Duke of Somerset	Algernon Percy Banks St Maur; 1813–1894; 14th Duke of Somerset	Francis Payne Seymour; 1815–1870	Thomas William Coke; 1822–1909; 2nd Earl of Leicester, etc.	Henry Charles FitzRoy Somerset; 1824–1899; 8th Duke of Beaufort, 10th Marquess of Worcester, 14th Earl of Worcester, 16th Baron Herbert, 8th Baron Botetourt	Richard Henry FitzRoy Somerset; 1817–1884; 2nd Baron Raglan
Earldom St. Maur extinct, 1885
Edward Adolphus Ferdinand St. Maur; 1835–1869	Algernon St Maur; 1846–1923; 15th Duke of Somerset	Edward Hamilton Seymour; 1860–1931; 16th Duke of Somerset	Hugh de Grey Seymour; 1843–1912; 6th Marquess of Hertford, etc., 7th Baron Conway	Thomas William Coke; 1848–1941; 3rd Earl of Leicester, etc.	Henry Adelbert Wellington FitzRoy Somerset; 1847–1924; 9th Duke of Beaufort, 11th Marquess of Worcester, 15th Earl of Worcester, 17th Baron Herbert, 9th Baron Botetourt	Henry Richard Charles Somerset; 1849–1932	George FitzRoy Henry Somerset; 1857–1921; 3rd Baron Raglan
Evelyn Francis Edward Seymour; 1882–1954; 17th Duke of Somerset	George Francis Alexander Seymour; 1871–1940; 7th Marquess of Hertford, etc., 8th Baron Conway	Henry Charles Seymour; 1878–1939	Thomas William Coke; 1880–1949; 4th Earl of Leicester, etc.	Arthur George Coke; 1882–1915	Henry Charles Somers Augustus Somerset; 1874–1945	FitzRoy Richard Somerset; 1885–1964; 4th Baron Raglan
Percy Hamilton Seymour; 1910–1984; 18th Duke of Somerset	Thomas William Edward Coke; 1908–1976; 5th Earl of Leicester, etc.	Anthony Louis Lovel Coke; 1909–1994; 6th Earl of Leicester, etc.	Henry Hugh Arthur FitzRoy Somerset; 1900–1984; 10th Duke of Beaufort, 12th Marquess of Worcester, 16th Earl of Worcester, 18th Baron Herbert, 10th Baron Botetourt	Henry Robert Somers FitzRoy de Vere Somerset; 1898–1965
Barony Botetourt abeyant, 1984
Hugh Edward Conway Seymour; 1930–1997; 8th Marquess of Hertford, etc., 9th Baron Conway	Edward Douglas Coke; 1936–2015; 7th Earl of Leicester, etc.	David Robert Somerset; 1928–2017; 11th Duke of Beaufort, 13th Marquess of Worcester, 17th Earl of Worcester	FitzRoy John Somerset; 1927–2010; 5th Baron Raglan	Geoffrey Somerset; 1932–2025; 6th Baron Raglan
John Michael Edward Seymour b. 1952; 19th Duke of Somerset	Henry (Harry) Jocelyn Seymour b. 1958; 9th Marquess of Hertford, etc., 10th Baron Conway	Thomas Edward Coke b. 1965; 8th Earl of Leicester, etc.	Henry John FitzRoy Somerset b. 1952; 12th Duke of Beaufort, 14th Marquess of Worcester, 18th Earl of Worcester	Arthur Geoffrey Somerset; 1960–2012
Sebastian Edward Seymour b. 1982 styled Lord Seymour	William Francis Seymour b. 1993 styled Earl of Yarmouth	Edward Horatio Coke b. 2003 styled Viscount Coke	Henry Robert FitzRoy Somerset b. 1989 styled Marquess of Worcester	Inigo Arthur Fitzroy Somerset; 7th Baron Raglan b. 2004	Ivo Geoffrey Arthur Tarsus Somerset b. 2007
Heir apparent to the Dukedom of Somerset	Heir apparent to the Marquessate of Hertford	Heir apparent to the Earldom of Leicester	Heir apparent to the Dukedom of Beaufort	Heir presumptive to the Raglan Barony

== Ancestral armorial ==
Arms	Name	Life	Blazon	Notes
	Charles Somerset, 1st Earl of Worcester, K.G.	1460–1526	Quarterly, 1st and 4th, France ancien, 2nd and 3rd England, within a bordure componée Argent and Azure (Beaufort) with argent baton sinister, with escutcheon of pretence of per pale azure and gules, three lions rampant argent, 2 and 1 (Herbert).	An illegitimate son of Henry Beaufort, 3rd Duke of Somerset by his mistress Joan Hill. He was invested as a Knight of the Garter in about 1496. On 1 February 1514 he was created Earl of Worcester and was at some time appointed Lord Chamberlain of the Household to King Henry VIII. As Lord Chamberlain, Somerset was largely responsible for the preparations for the Field of Cloth of Gold in 1520. He was a favourite of Henry VII and Henry VIII

Arms	Name	Life	Blazon	Notes
	William Somerset, 3rd Earl of Worcester, K.G.	1526/7–1589	Quarterly, 1st and 4th, or a fess quarterly 1st and 4th France moderne, 2nd and 3rd England, within a bordure componée Argent and Azure (Beaufort), 2nd, per pale azure and gules, three lions rampant argent, 2 and 1 (Herbert), 3d argent a fess gules, with a canton gules (Woodville).	Eldest son of Henry Somerset, 2nd Earl of Worcester and his second wife Elizabeth Browne.

Arms	Name	Life	Blazon	Notes
	Edward Somerset, 4th Earl of Worcester, K.G.	1550–1628	Grand quarters, 1st and 4th, quarterly, 1st and 4th, France moderne, 2nd and 3rd England, within a bordure componée Argent and Azure (Beaufort), 2nd per pale azure and gules, three lions rampant argent, 2 and 1 (Herbert), 3d argent a fess gules, with a canton gules (Woodville).	Eldest son of William Somerset, 3rd Earl of Worcester. He was an important advisor to King James I (James VI of Scots), serving as Lord Privy Seal.

Arms	Name	Life	Blazon	Notes
	Henry Somerset, 1st Duke of Beaufort, K.G., PC	1629–1700	Quarterly, 1st and 4th France moderne, 2nd and 3rd England, within a bordure componée Argent and Azure (Beaufort).	Eldest son of Edward Somerset, 2nd Marquess of Worcester. He was a Welsh politician who sat in the House of Commons at various times between 1654 and 1667, when he succeeded his father as 3rd Marquess of Worcester. He was styled Lord Herbert from 1644 until 3 April 1667. The Dukedom of Beaufort was bestowed upon him by King Charles II in 1682. He is the ancestor of the current Somersets, and so the Dukes of Beaufort and the Barons Raglan. The current head of the house is Henry Somerset, 12th Duke of Beaufort.

== See also ==
- Duchess of Beaufort
- Viscount Somerset
- Baron Raglan

== Bibliography ==
- "Portrait of William Somerset, 3rd Earl of Worcester". Wikimedia Commons. 13 July 2018.
- Robinson, W.R.B. (2004), "Somerset, William, third earl of Worcester", Oxford Dictionary of National Biography (online ed.), Oxford University Press, doi:10.1093/ref:odnb/26015 (Subscription, Wikipedia Library access or UK public library membership required.)
- Gurney, E. Henry (1890). Reference handbook for readers, students, and teachers of English history. Boston: Ginn & Company. p. 55.
- Pinches, John Harvey; Pinches, Rosemary (1974). The Royal Heraldry of England. Heraldry Today. Slough, Buckinghamshire: Hollen Street Press. ISBN 0-900455-25-X.
- Burke, John (1914). Burke's genealogical and heraldic history of peerage, baronetage and knightage. New York: G.P.Putnam's Sons. p. 207.
- Hesilrige, Arthur G. M. (1921). Debrett's Peerage and Titles of courtesy. London: London: Dean & son, limited. p. 100.
