= Mary of Teck (disambiguation) =

Mary of Teck (1867–1953) was the queen consort of George V, King of the United Kingdom.

Mary of Teck or May of Teck may also refer to:

- Princess Mary Adelaide of Cambridge (1833–1897), by marriage Princess Mary Adelaide, Duchess of Teck
- Mary Somerset, Duchess of Beaufort (sportswoman) (1897–1987), born Princess Mary of Teck
- Lady May Abel Smith (1906–1994), born Princess May of Teck
