= Mary Butler, Duchess of Ormonde =

Her Grace The Duchess of Ormonde
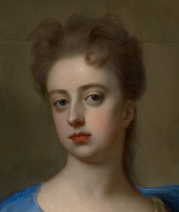
- Mary, Duchess of Ormonde, painted by Michael Dahl
- Born: 1664
- Died: 19 November 1733 (aged 68–69)
- Spouse(s): James Butler, 2nd Duke of Ormonde
- Issue: Thomas, Earl of Ossory; Lady Mary Butler; Lady Elizabeth Butler
- Father: Henry Somerset, 1st Duke of Beaufort
- Mother: Mary Capell

Mary Butler, Duchess of Ormonde (1664 – 19 November 1733) was the second wife of James Butler, 2nd Duke of Ormonde, Ireland.

The duke's first wife, Lady Anne Hyde, daughter of Viscount Hyde of Kenilworth, died in January 1685, leaving one daughter, Lady Mary Butler, who died in infancy. At the time of his second marriage, he was still styled Earl of Ossory.

Lady Mary Somerset was the daughter of the Duke of Beaufort and his wife, the former Mary Capel. She married the duke on 3 August 1685 at St. Michael's Church, Great Badminton, Gloucestershire, the same church where her mother and several Dukes of Beaufort are buried.

In 1688, on the death of his grandfather, the earl succeeded to the dukedom. His wife then became a duchess. The earl was also appointed a Knight of the Order of the Garter on 28 September that year.

The duke and duchess had a son and two daughters:

- Thomas, Earl of Ossory (died 1689)
- Lady Mary Butler (died 1713), who married John Ashburnham, 1st Earl of Ashburnham, and had no children
- Lady Elizabeth Butler (died 1750)

In 1702, the duchess became a Lady of the Bedchamber to the new monarch, Queen Anne of Great Britain. A portrait of her with her son, the Earl of Ossory, was painted by Sir Godfrey Kneller

In 1715, because of his support for the Jacobite rising of 1715, her husband's titles were forfeited and he was obliged to go into exile. It was eventually ruled that the attainder enacted by the Parliament, applied only to his titles in the Peerages of England and Scotland, not to his Irish titles, which were later restored on behalf of his brother, Charles Butler, 1st Earl of Arran.

The duchess is thought not to have had any contact with her husband during his long exile. Nevertheless, along with the duke and their son and daughters, the duchess was buried in the family vault at Westminster Abbey.
