= Henry Scudamore, 3rd Duke of Beaufort =

English nobleman and peer (1707-1745)

His Grace The Duke of Beaufort
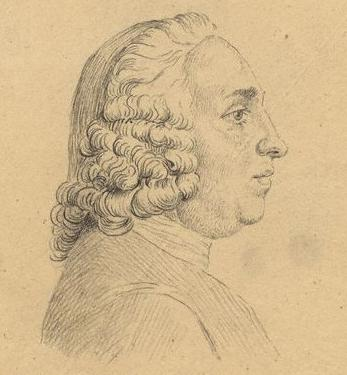
- Born: Lord Henry Somerset; 23 March 1707
- Died: 26 February 1745 (aged 37)
- Noble family: Beaufort
- Spouse: Frances Scudamore (m. 1729; div. 1743)
- Issue: Margaret Burr (illegitimate)
- Father: Henry Somerset, 2nd Duke of Beaufort
- Mother: Rachel Noel

Henry Somerset-Scudamore, 3rd Duke of Beaufort (23 March 1707 – 26 February 1745), born Lord Henry Somerset, was an English nobleman and peer who supported Jacobitism.

== Life ==
He was the elder son of Henry Somerset, 2nd Duke of Beaufort and his second wife, Rachel Noel. As his father's eldest son and heir to his father's title he was known as (styled) Marquess of Worcester, a courtesy title. On his father's death on 24 April 1714, he succeeded him and became 3rd Duke of Beaufort.

At the age of 19, Beaufort commissioned the construction of what would later become known as the Badminton Chest or Badminton Cabinet, an ornate set of drawers made in Florence. The chest was sold in 2004 to Hans-Adam II, Prince of Liechtenstein for £19 million, making it the most expensive piece of furniture in the world. It is on display in the Palais Liechtenstein in Vienna, Austria.

The Duke was one of several founding governors of Britain's first institution for abandoned children, the Foundling Hospital, and his name is listed in its royal charter received from George II in October 1739.

In 1743, he was one of several leading English Tories who communicated with the French government through Francis Sempill in order to elicit French support for an invasion to restore the Stuart line.

After his death, the 3rd Duke of Beaufort was buried at St Michael and All Angels Church, Badminton. His memorial was sculpted by John Michael Rysbrack in 1754.

Because he had no legitimate children, his titles and estates were inherited by his younger brother, Charles Noel Somerset.

== Family ==
Duke and Duchess of Beaufort's Name and Lord Scudamore's Estate Act 1729
- Act of Parliament
- Parliament of Great Britain
- Long title: An Act for obliging Henry Duke of Beaufort. and Frances Dutchess of Beaufort and her Children, to take the additional Surname, and bear the Arms, of Scudamore, pursuant to a Settlement made by James late Lord Scudamore in the Kingdom of Ireland; and for vesting in the said Duke, in Fee, the Manors of Wickball and Ditton Camois, and Lands in the County of Cambridge, late the Estate of the said Lord Scudamore, in Lieu of the Portion provided by him for his Daughter the said Dutchess; and for other Purposes therein mentioned.
- Citation: 3 Geo. 2. c. 10 Pr.
- Territorial extent: Great Britain

Dates
- Royal assent: 15 May 1730
- Commencement: 13 January 1730 (Note: Start of session.)
Other legislation
Relates to	Duke of Beaufort's Divorce Act 1743

Status: Current legislation

On 28 June 1729 Beaufort married Frances Scudamore, the only daughter and heir of James Scudamore, 3rd Viscount Scudamore, and took his wife's name by a private act of Parliament, the Duke and Duchess of Beaufort's Name and Lord Scudamore's Estate Act 1729 (3 Geo. 2. c. 10 Pr.), later the same year.

Duke of Beaufort's Divorce Act 1743
- Act of Parliament
- Parliament of Great Britain
- Long title: An Act to dissolve the Marriage of Henry Duke of Beaufort with Frances Scudamore his now Wife; and to enable him to marry again; and for other Purposes therein mentioned.
- Citation: 17 Geo. 2. c. 2 Pr.
- Territorial extent: Great Britain

Dates
- Royal assent: 2 March 1744
- Commencement: 1 December 1743
Other legislation
Relates to	Duke and Duchess of Beaufort's Name and Lord Scudamore's Estate Act 1729

Status: Current legislation

In 1742 Beaufort filed for divorce over Frances's adulterous relationship with William Talbot, who later became Earl Talbot. Frances countersued, saying the Duke was impotent; in March 1743, he demonstrated before court-appointed examiners that he was physically able to have an erection. The divorce was granted by the Duke of Beaufort's Divorce Act 1743 (17 Geo. 2. c. 2 Pr.), and he sued Talbot for damages. Frances later remarried, to Charles FitzRoy-Scudamore.

Beaufort had one illegitimate daughter, Margaret Burr, who married the English painter Thomas Gainsborough and had two surviving daughters, Mary and Margaret.

== Notes ==
Peerage of England
Preceded by Henry Somerset	Duke of Beaufort; 1714–1745	Succeeded by Charles Noel Somerset
