= Henry Somerset, 2nd Duke of Beaufort =

English politician

His Grace The Duke of Beaufort KG PC
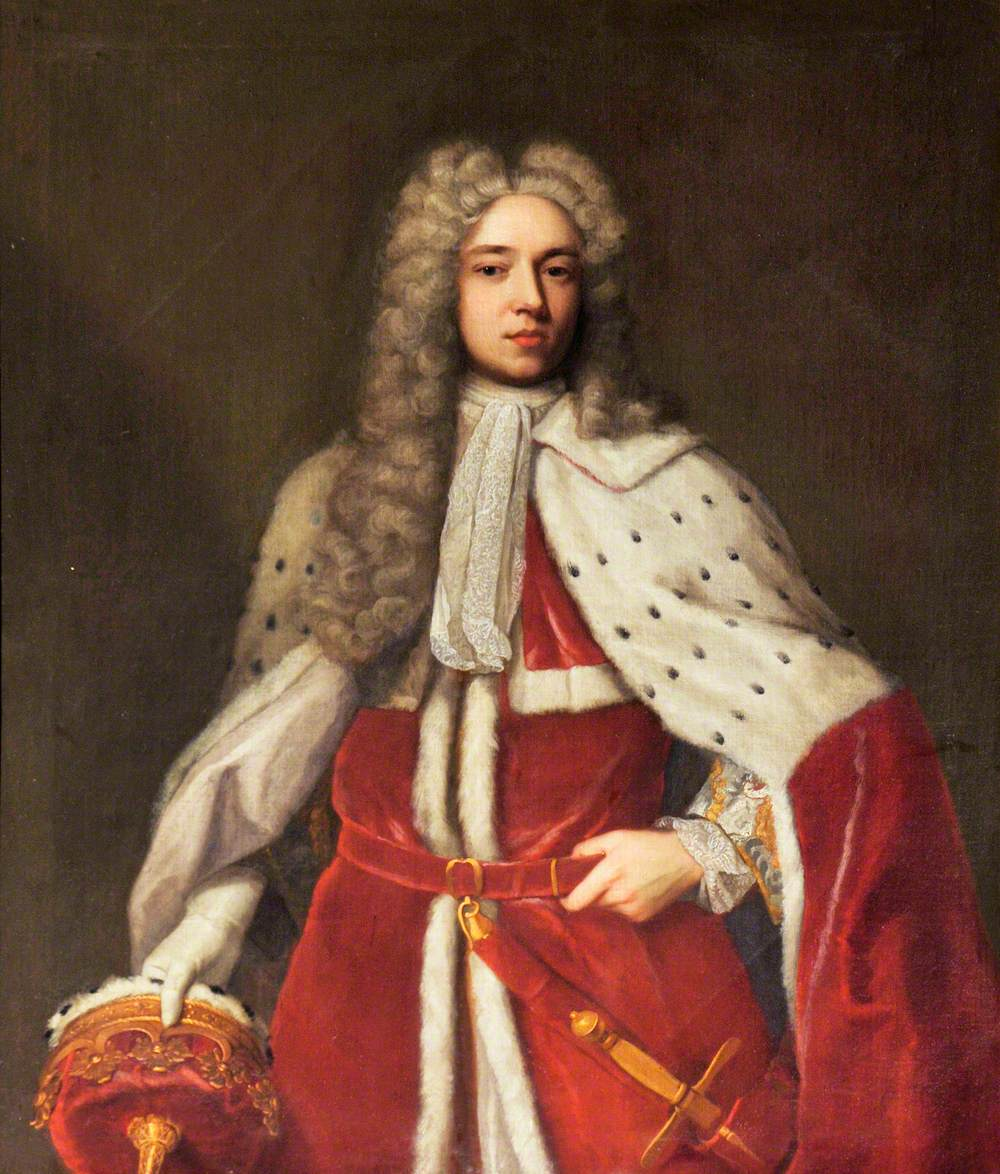
- Portrait by Michael Dahl, c. 1702–1712
- Born: 2 April 1684
- Died: 24 May 1714 (aged 30)
- Noble family: Beaufort
- Spouses: Mary Sackville; Rachel Noel; Mary Osborne
- Issue: Henry Somerset, 3rd Duke of Beaufort; Charles Noel Somerset, 4th Duke of Beaufort
- Father: Charles Somerset, Marquess of Worcester
- Mother: Rebecca Child

Henry Somerset, 2nd Duke of Beaufort KG PC (2 April 1684 – 24 May 1714) was an English politician. He was the only son of Charles Somerset, Marquess of Worcester, and Rebecca Child. He was styled Earl of Glamorgan until 1698, and Marquess of Worcester from 1698 until his grandfather's death on 21 January 1700, when he succeeded him as 2nd Duke of Beaufort.

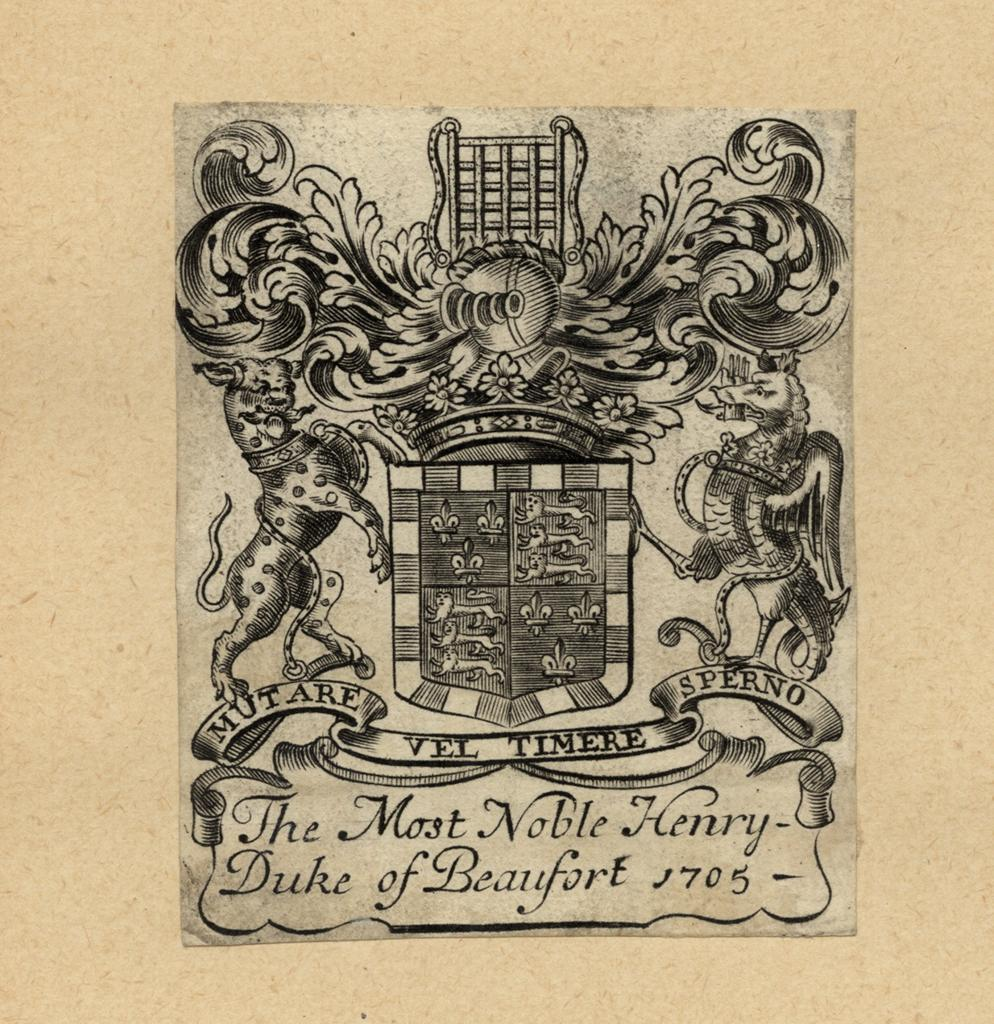
Bookplate of Henry Somerset, Duke of Beaufort

== Life ==
Born at Monmouth Castle, he entertained Queen Anne and the Duke of Cumberland with splendour at Badminton in August 1702. He held aloof from public affairs until the fall of Sunderland heralded the collapse of the Whig Junto in 1710, when he is said to have remarked to the queen that he could at length call her a queen in reality. A thorough-going Tory, he founded the Loyal Brotherhood in 1709. He was, after some opposition from Jonathan Swift, admitted a member of the Tory dining club, the "Society of Brothers", on 21 February 1711. He was made captain of the gentlemen pensioners in 1712, and appointed a Knight of the Garter in October 1712.

Dying at the age of thirty, on 24 May 1714, Beaufort was succeeded by his son Henry. The 2nd Duke is buried at St Michael and All Angels Church, Badminton.

== Family ==
He married three times:

- On 7 July 1702 to Lady Mary Sackville, daughter of Charles Sackville, 6th Earl of Dorset, who died 18 June 1705, with whom he had no issue;
- On 26 February 1706 to Lady Rachel Noel, daughter of Wriothesley Baptist Noel, 2nd Earl of Gainsborough, who died 13 September 1709 after giving birth, and
- On 14 September 1711 at St Mary's Church, Wimbledon to Lady Mary Osborne (d. 4 February 1722), daughter of Peregrine Osborne, 2nd Duke of Leeds, with whom he had no issue.

With his second wife he had two sons:

1. Henry Somerset, 3rd Duke of Beaufort his heir and successor; and
2. Charles Noel Somerset, 4th Duke of Beaufort his brother's heir and successor.

== Notes ==
Attribution

This article incorporates text from a publication now in the public domain: "Somerset, Henry". Dictionary of National Biography. London: Smith, Elder & Co. 1885–1900.

Honorary titles
Preceded by The Duke of St Albans	Captain of the Gentlemen Pensioners; 1712–1714	Succeeded by The Duke of St Albans
Preceded by The Duke of Bolton	Lord Lieutenant of Hampshire; 1710–1714	Succeeded by The Duke of Bolton
Preceded by The Earl of Berkeley	Lord Lieutenant of Gloucestershire; 1712–1714	Succeeded by The Earl of Berkeley
Peerage of England
Preceded by Henry Somerset	Duke of Beaufort; 1700–1714	Succeeded by Henry Somerset
