= Badminton, Gloucestershire =

Village in Gloucestershire, England

Coordinates: 51.543°N 2.285°W

Badminton
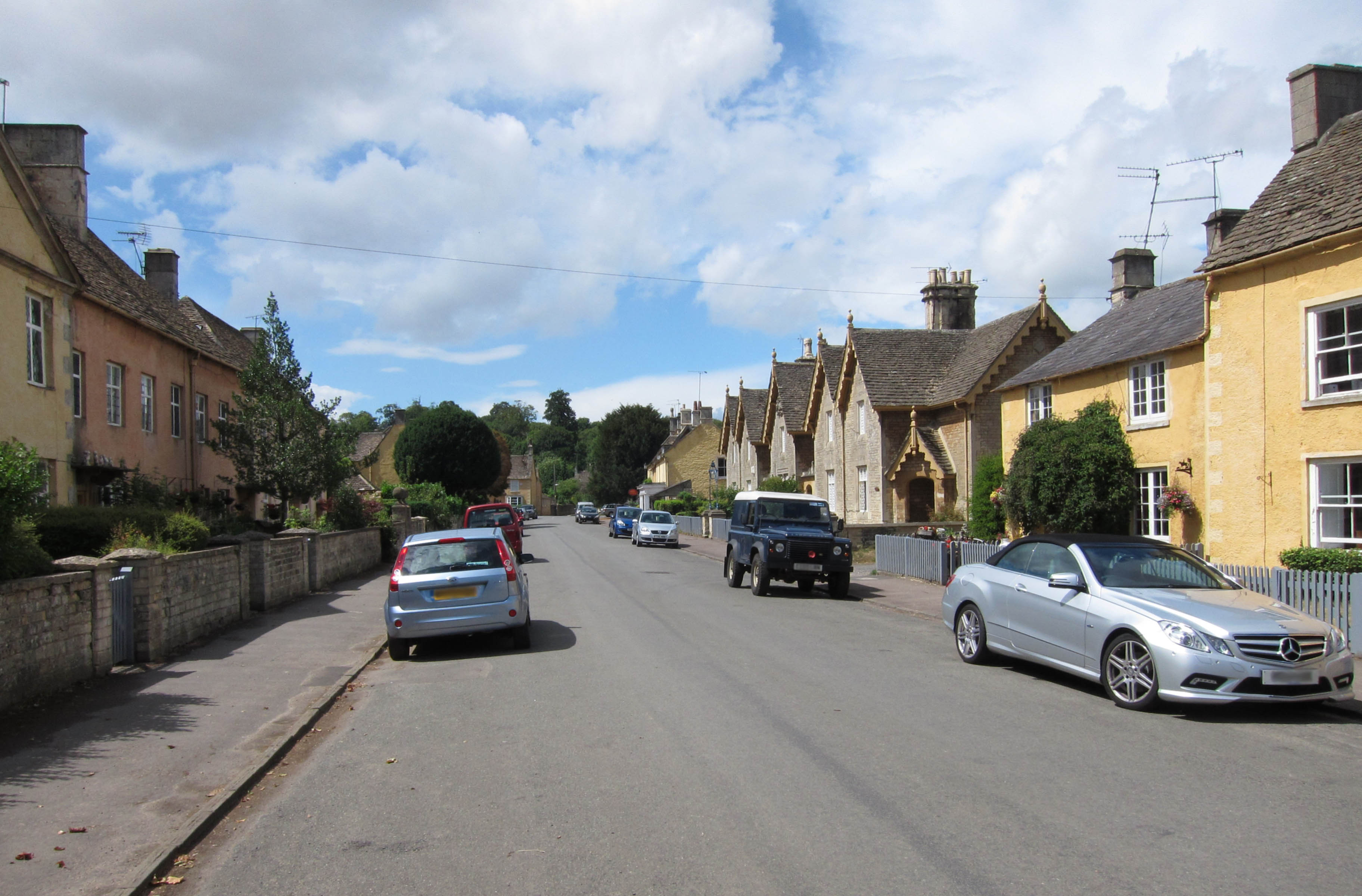

- Location within Gloucestershire
- Population: 271 (2011)
- OS grid reference: ST8082
- Civil parish: Badminton
- Unitary authority: South Gloucestershire
- Ceremonial county: Gloucestershire
- Region: South West
- Country: England
- Sovereign state: United Kingdom
- Post town: BADMINTON
- Postcode district: GL9
- Dialling code: 01454
- Police: Avon and Somerset
- Fire: Avon
- Ambulance: South Western
- UK Parliament: Thornbury and Yate
- Website: www.badmintonparishcouncil.co.uk

Badminton is a village and civil parish in South Gloucestershire, England. The only settlement in the parish is Badminton village, sometimes called Great Badminton to distinguish it from the hamlet of Little Badminton, about one mile to the north in Hawkesbury parish. The large country house called Badminton House is close to the north end of the village, and its surrounding deer park lies to the north and west.

== History ==
The Domesday Book of 1086 recorded a manor at Madmintune with 24 households. In 1612 Edward Somerset, 4th Earl of Worcester, bought from Nicholas Boteler his manors of Great and Little Badminton. One century earlier the name Badimyncgtun was recorded, held by that family since 1275.

== Badminton House ==
The village houses the Duke of Beaufort's residence, Badminton House, which has been the principal seat of the Somerset family since the late 17th century. Badminton House also gives its name to the sport of badminton.

== Amenities ==
The village has a small shop which also serves as a post office. The nearest pub, the Fox and Hounds, is in the nearby village of Acton Turville.

The village is close to the A46 and A433 roads, and the B4040 passes south of it. The M4 motorway can be reached via the A46. The railway station in Acton Turville closed in 1968, but the line is still active. The nearest railway station is Yate on the Bristol–Gloucester line. West of the village is Badminton Airfield.

Badminton Horse Trials are held in early May each year in the parkland of Badminton House.

Badminton Golf Club (now defunct) was founded in the late 1890s or early 1900s. The club closed in 1914.

== Parish church ==
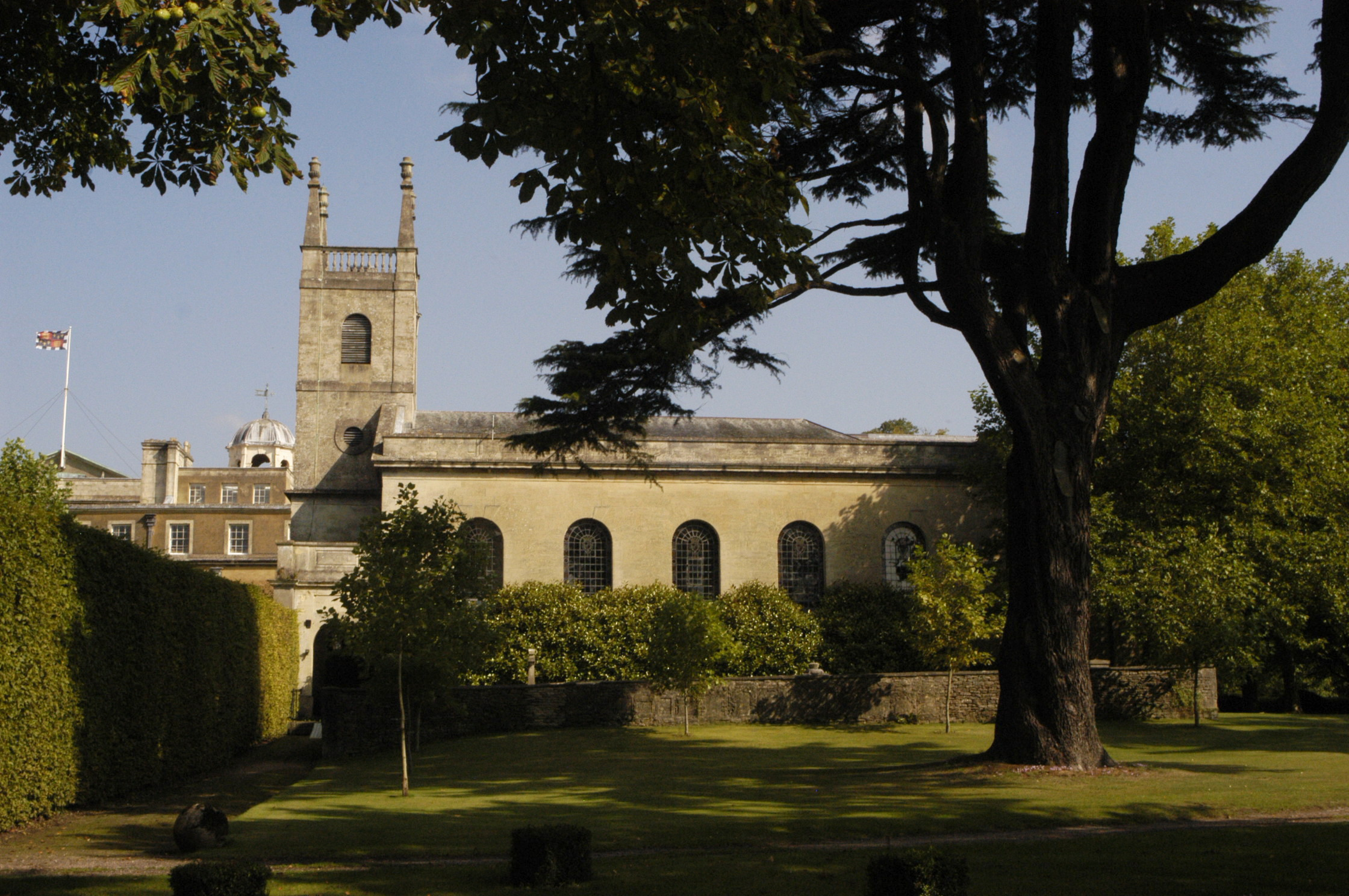
Church of St Michael and All Angels

The parish church of St Michael and All Angels is attached to the Duke of Beaufort's residence. The current church was built in 1785 and serves as the principal burial place of the Somerset family. Nearly all Dukes and Duchesses are interred here.

== Notable events ==
Field Marshal FitzRoy James Henry Somerset, 1st Baron Raglan, aide-de-camp to the Duke of Wellington in the Peninsular War and later commander of all the British forces in the Crimean War was born, raised and buried in Badminton. He was the youngest son of the 5th Duke of Beaufort.

During the Second World War, Queen Mary left Marlborough House in London to take up residence at Badminton House, staying for the duration of the war. She lived there with her niece Mary, Duchess of Beaufort, wife of the 10th Duke.
