= Mary Somerset, Duchess of Beaufort (gardener) =

English gardener, and botanist (1630–1715)

Her Grace The Duchess of Beaufort
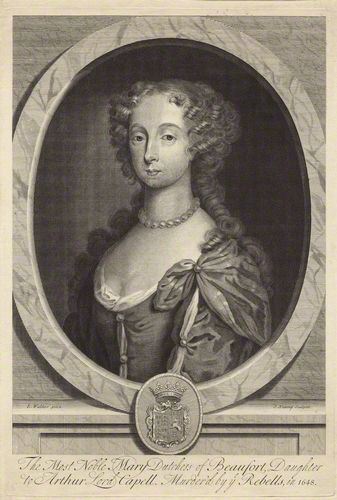
- Born: baptised 16 December 1630; Hadham Parva
- Died: 7 January 1715 (aged 84); Chelsea
- Resting place: St Michael and All Angels Church, Badminton
- Known for: herbarium and introduction of exotic species to English gardening
- Spouses: Henry Seymour, Lord Beauchamp; Henry Somerset
- Children: 9, including Charles, Mary, Henrietta, and Anne
- Scientific career
- Fields: Aristocrat and botanist

Mary Somerset, Duchess of Beaufort (baptised 16 December 1630 – 7 January 1715) also known by her other married name of Mary Seymour, Lady Beauchamp and her maiden name Mary Capell, was an English noblewoman, gardener and botanist. Among her introductions to British gardening are Pelargonium zonale, Ageratum species and Passiflora caerulea.

== Early life ==
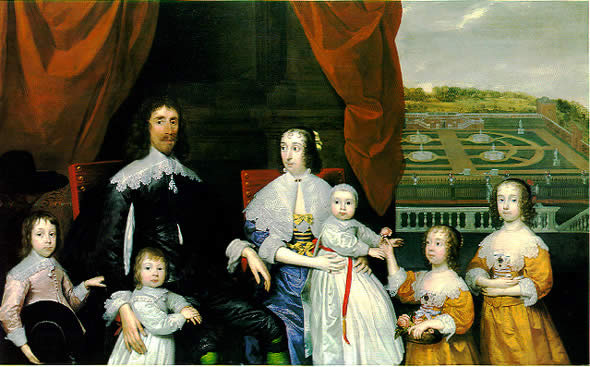
Mary Capell with a basket of flowers (second from right) and the Capell family by Cornelius Johnson c.1640, at the National Portrait Gallery, London.

Mary was born in Hadham Parva, Hertfordshire, sometime before 16 December 1630, on which date she was baptised. She was the daughter of Sir Arthur Capell, 1st Baron Capell of Hadham and Elizabeth Morrison.

== Life ==
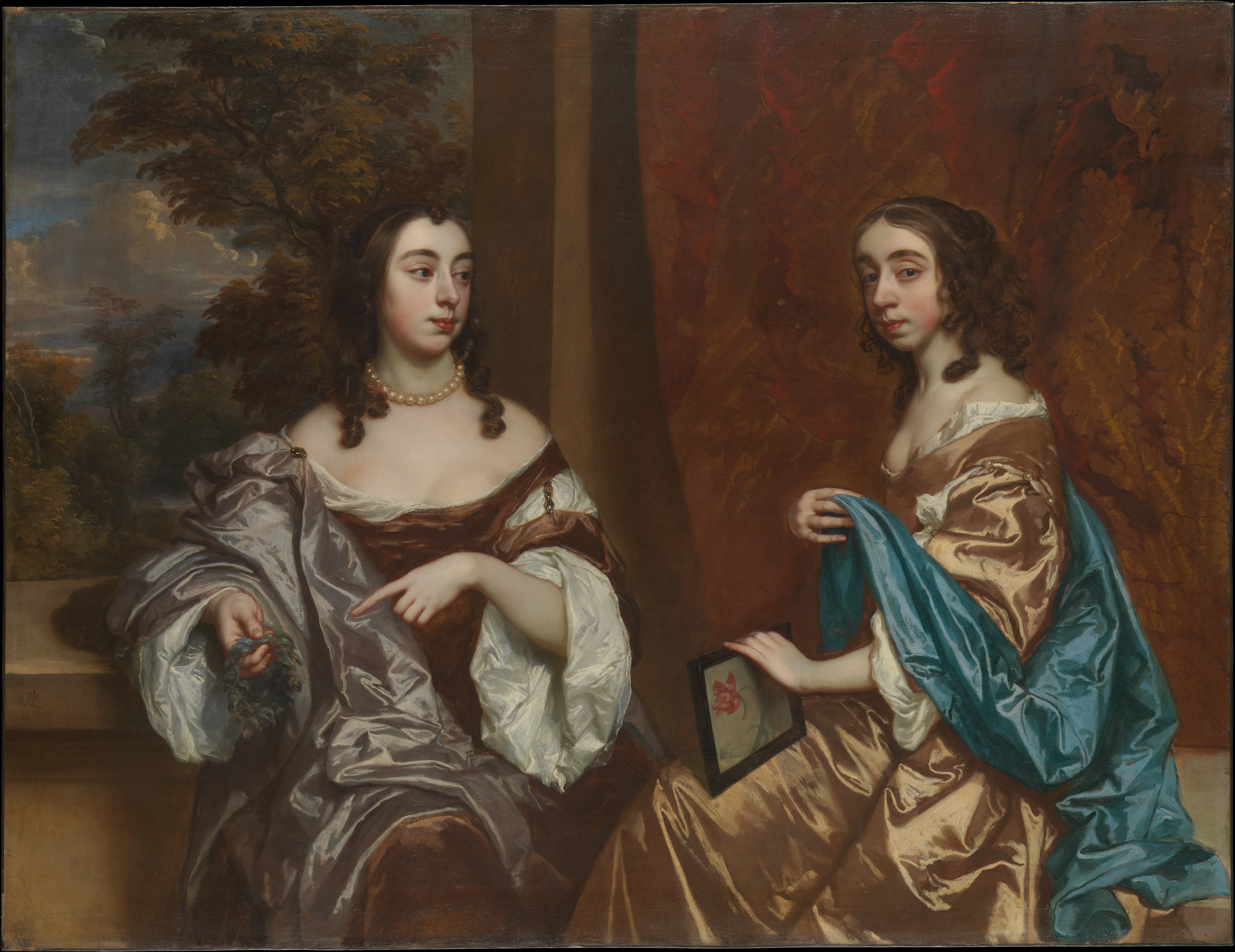
Mary Capell and Her Sister, Elizabeth Capell, Countess of Carnarvon by Sir Peter Lely, at the Metropolitan Museum of Art

On 28 June 1648, Mary married her first husband Henry Seymour, Lord Beauchamp, and they had one son and one daughter. Her husband was a Royalist, imprisoned during the English Civil War. Her second husband, whom she married on 17 August 1657 was Henry Somerset, who became 1st Duke of Beaufort, by whom she had six children.

During the Popish Plot, she was required in her husband's absence to call out the militia, to deal with a false alarm of a French invasion at the Isle of Purbeck, and did so "in a state of deadly fear". The supposed invasion, like much that happened (or did not happen) during the Plot, was simply the result of public hysteria. Despite this moment of panic, in general, she maintained a detached and rational attitude to the Plot, expressing her amazement that the informer William Bedloe, whom she knew to be "a villain whose word would not have been taken at sixpence", should now have "power to ruin any man". She attended the trial of the Catholic barrister Richard Langhorne, presumably in case Bedloe, a bitter enemy of her husband, made any charges against him, and took notes of the evidence. When Bedloe protested at her presence, the Lord Chief Justice, William Scroggs, pointed out that the trial was open to the public, and asked irritably what a woman's notes amounted to anyway: "no more than her tongue, truly".

She was a notoriously exacting employer "striking terror in the hearts of her servants": every day she would do a tour of the house and grounds, and any servant not found hard at work was instantly dismissed. Even neighbouring landowners held her in awe, and were anxious not to cross her.

=== Botanist and gardener ===
The Duchess of Beaufort was one of Britain's earliest distinguished lady gardeners, Alice Coats observes. She began seriously to collect plants in the 1690s, and her interest in gardening intensified in her widowhood. She had the assistance of such well-known gardeners and botanists as George London and Leonard Plukenet; seeds came to her from the West Indies, South Africa, India, Sri Lanka, China and Japan. In 1702, she engaged the services of William Sherard as tutor for her grandson, 'hee loving my diversion so well'. Sherard helped introduce more than 1500 plants, most of them greenhouse subjects, to her collection, at Badminton House or at Beaufort House, Chelsea. Sir Robert Southwell, Sir Hans Sloane and Jacob Bobart are all known to have sought her assistance in growing and identifying plants from unidentified seeds, some of which had come to them through the Royal Society of London.

Her London house was next to that of Sir Hans Sloane, making her a neighbour of the Chelsea Physic Garden. Her herbarium, in twelve volumes, 'gathered and dried by order of Mary Duchess of Beaufort', she bequeathed to Sir Hans Sloane, by whose bequest it came to the Natural History Museum. Her two-volume florilegium of drawings by Everard Kickius of her most choice exotics remains in the library at Badminton. Among her introductions to British gardening, most of which were greenhouse plants, are Pelargonium zonale one of the parents of the zonal pelargoniums of gardens, Ageratum species and Passiflora caerulea.

She is also notable for being one of the earliest women known to have her own collection of the Philosophical Transactions, the journal of the Royal Society of London.

== Personal life ==
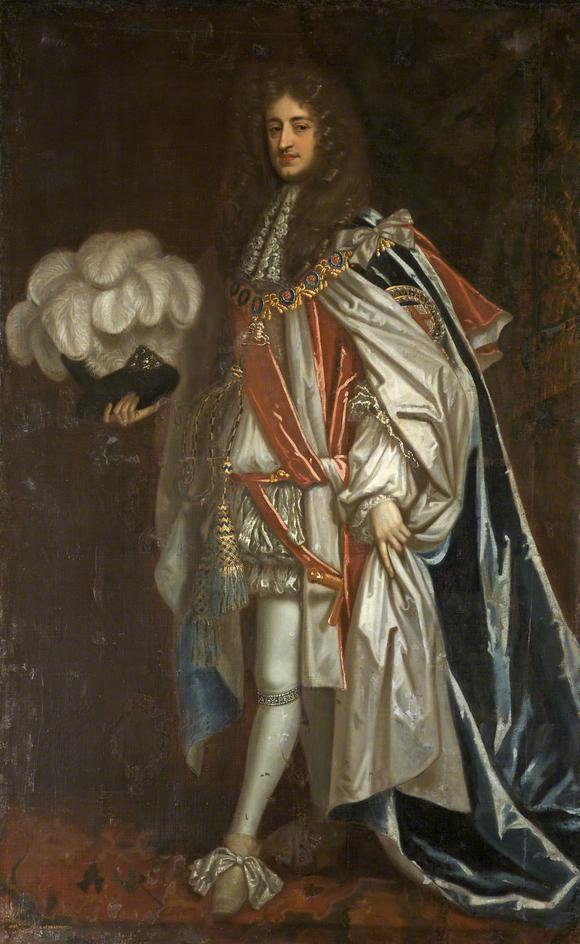
A portrait of her second husband, The Duke of Beaufort, at Gloucester City Museum & Art Gallery.

With her first husband, Henry Seymour, Lord Beauchamp (c. 1626–1654), she had two children:

- William Seymour, 3rd Duke of Somerset (died 1671, without issue)
- Lady Elizabeth Seymour (c. 1655–1697) married Thomas Bruce, 2nd Earl of Ailesbury. On the death of her brother, she became the senior heir in the line of Princess Mary Tudor (the younger sister of Henry VIII).

With her second husband, Henry Somerset, 1st Duke of Beaufort (1629–1700), she had:

- Henry Somerset, Lord Herbert (bef. 1660), who died as infant
- Charles Somerset, Marquess of Worcester (1660-1698), who had a military and political career.
- unknown daughter Somerset (b. bef. 1663)
- Lady Mary Somerset (1664-1733), who married James Butler, 2nd Duke of Ormonde
- Lady Henrietta Somerset (c.1670-1715), who married firstly, Lord Ilbracken, son of Henry O'Brien, 7th Earl of Thomond, and secondly, Henry Howard, 6th Earl of Suffolk
- Lord Arthur Somerset (1671-1743), who married Mary Russell in 1695, daughter of William Russell, 1st and last Bt., and Hesther Rouse, daughter of Sir Thomas Rouse, 1st Bt. (1608-1676). Their daughter, Mary Somerset, was the grandmother of Sir Charles William Rouse Boughton, 1st and 9th Bt.
- Lady Anne Somerset (1673–1763), who married Thomas Coventry, 2nd Earl of Coventry

Mary was widowed in 1700. She died on 7 January 1715 in Chelsea, London, England at the age of 84. She was buried at St Michael and All Angels Church in Badminton, Gloucestershire.

=== Legacy and descendants ===
The genus Beaufortia, erected in the 19th century by Robert Brown to describe some Myrtaceous plants of Southwest Australia, commemorates her.

Her portrait was painted by Sir Godfrey Kneller in 1708. Sir Peter Lely's portrait of the Duchess with the Countess of Carnarvon is at the Metropolitan Museum of Art.

Preceded by New title	Duchess of Beaufort; 2 December 1682 – 21 January 1700	Succeeded by Vacant until 7 July 1702; Mary Sackville Somerset
Preceded by New title	Dowager Duchess of Beaufort; 21 January 1700 – 7 January 1715	Succeeded by Mary Osborne Somerset, Duchess of Beaufort
