= Little Badminton =

Village in South Gloucestershire, England

Coordinates: 51.557°N 2.289°W

Little Badminton is a small village in Hawkesbury parish in South Gloucestershire, England.

The name of the settlement distinguishes it from the village and parish of Badminton, its neighbour to the south. It is within the Badminton House estate, and the deer park surrounding the house hugs the eastern edge of the hamlet.

The church of St Michael and All Angels was begun in the early 13th century, altered in the 14th and restored in the 19th. It is a Grade I listed building. Its parish has been merged with that of Badminton, and is now part of the Badminton Benefice grouping.

Little Badminton was designated as a Conservation Area in 1983. Little Badminton farmhouse, on Church Lane, is from the 18th and 19th centuries but is probably a remodelling of a 17th-century house. A late medieval dovecote on the village green is Grade II* listed and has been called "probably the best early dovecote in the country".

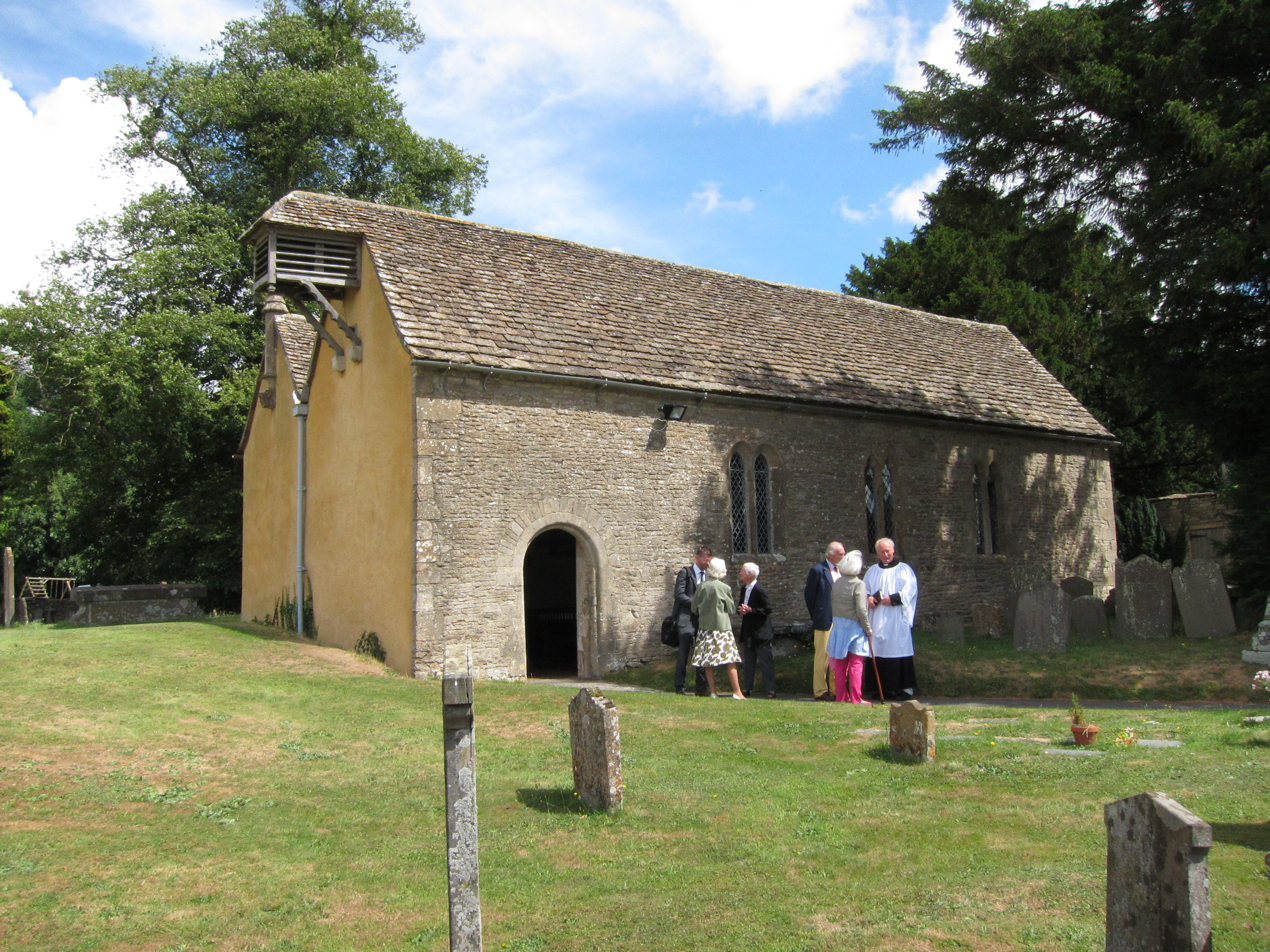
The village church

The 1965 romantic drama movie Sky West and Crooked (known in the United States as Gypsy Girl), directed by John Mills and featuring Hayley Mills, was filmed in and around Little Badminton.
