= Badminton cabinet =

Piece of furniture

Badminton Cabinet
- Designer: Grand Ducal workshops
- Date: 1726–1732
- Made in: Florence, Italy
- Sold by: Christie's Auction House, London, 9 December 2004 £19,045,250 ($36,662,106)
- Height: 386 cm (151.5 in)
- Width: 232.5 cm (91.25 in)
- Collection: Badminton House, Gloucestershire, England (1732–1990); Barbara Piasecka Johnson, Princeton, New Jersey (1990–2004); Liechtenstein Museum, Vienna, Austria (2004–present)

The Badminton Cabinet is a monumental piece of 18th-century furniture that twice set the record for most expensive piece of furniture ever sold.

The Badminton Cabinet, or Badminton Chest, was commissioned in 1726 by Henry Somerset, 3rd Duke of Beaufort, at the age of 19. It took thirty experts six years to make, and came to be named after the Duke's country seat, Badminton House in Gloucestershire, England, where it remained until it was auctioned by his descendants in the late 20th century.

The ebony cabinet is 386 cm (152 in) tall and 232.5 cm (91.5 in) wide and shows scenes rendered in pietra dura—inlaid finely cut, polished and coloured stones, including in this case a number of semi-precious stones. The clock face set at the top of the cabinet is marked with fleurs-de-lis, flanked by two gilded statues, and surmounted with a coat of arms. Below that is a parapet set with pietra dura lozenges. Three horizontal sections with inlaid drawers surround a central cupboard. The cabinet rests on eight inlaid pilasters.

The Badminton Cabinet became the highest-priced piece of furniture in the world when it was auctioned for £8.58 million in 1990. It again set the record when it was auctioned in December 2004, this time for £19 million, bought by Hans-Adam II of Liechtenstein.
