= Duke of Beaufort's Hunt =

Fox hunting pack

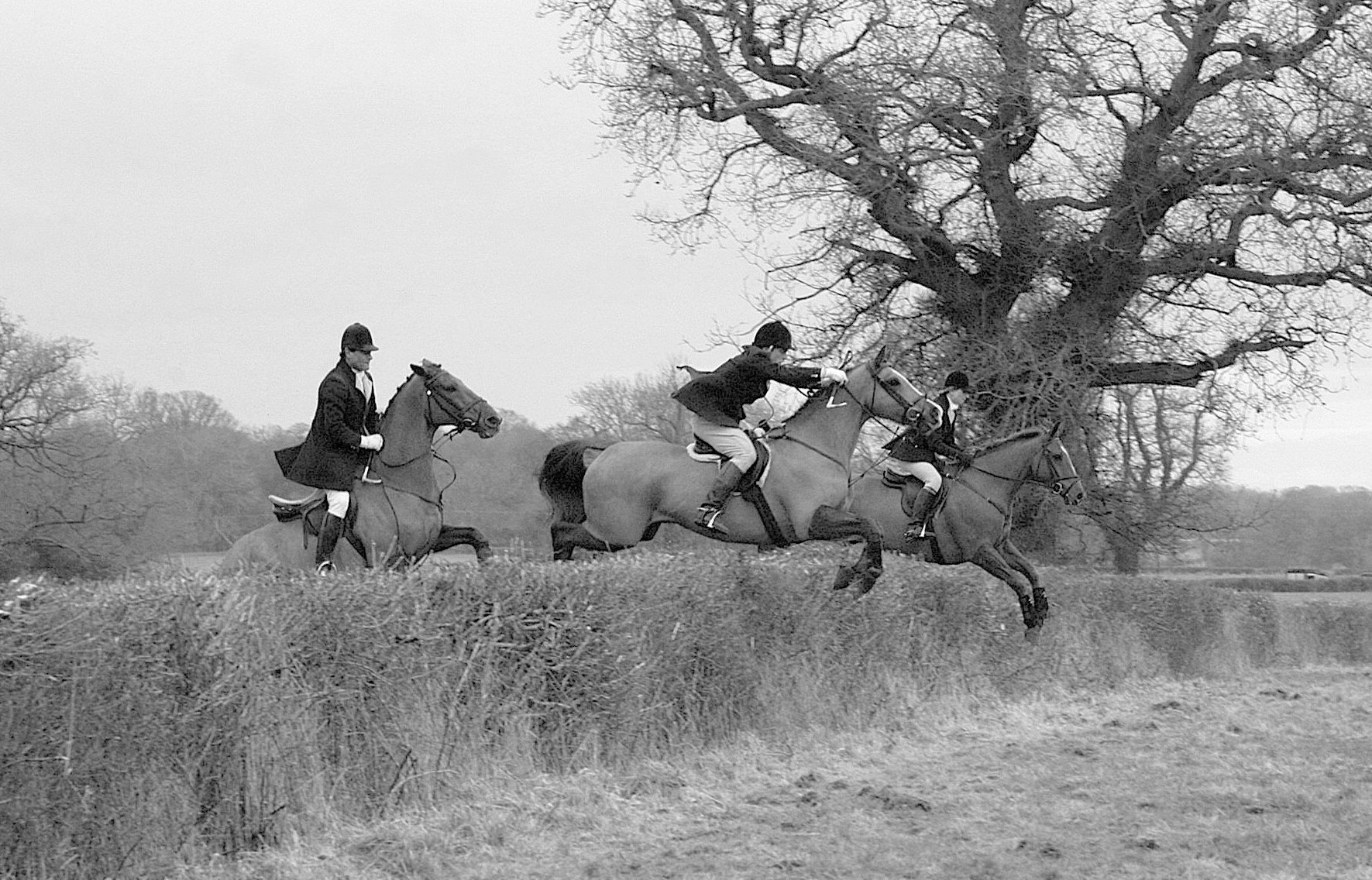
Beaufort Hunt pictured in 2010

The Duke of Beaufort's Hunt, also called the Beaufort and Beaufort Hunt, is one of the oldest and largest of the fox hunting packs in England.

== History ==
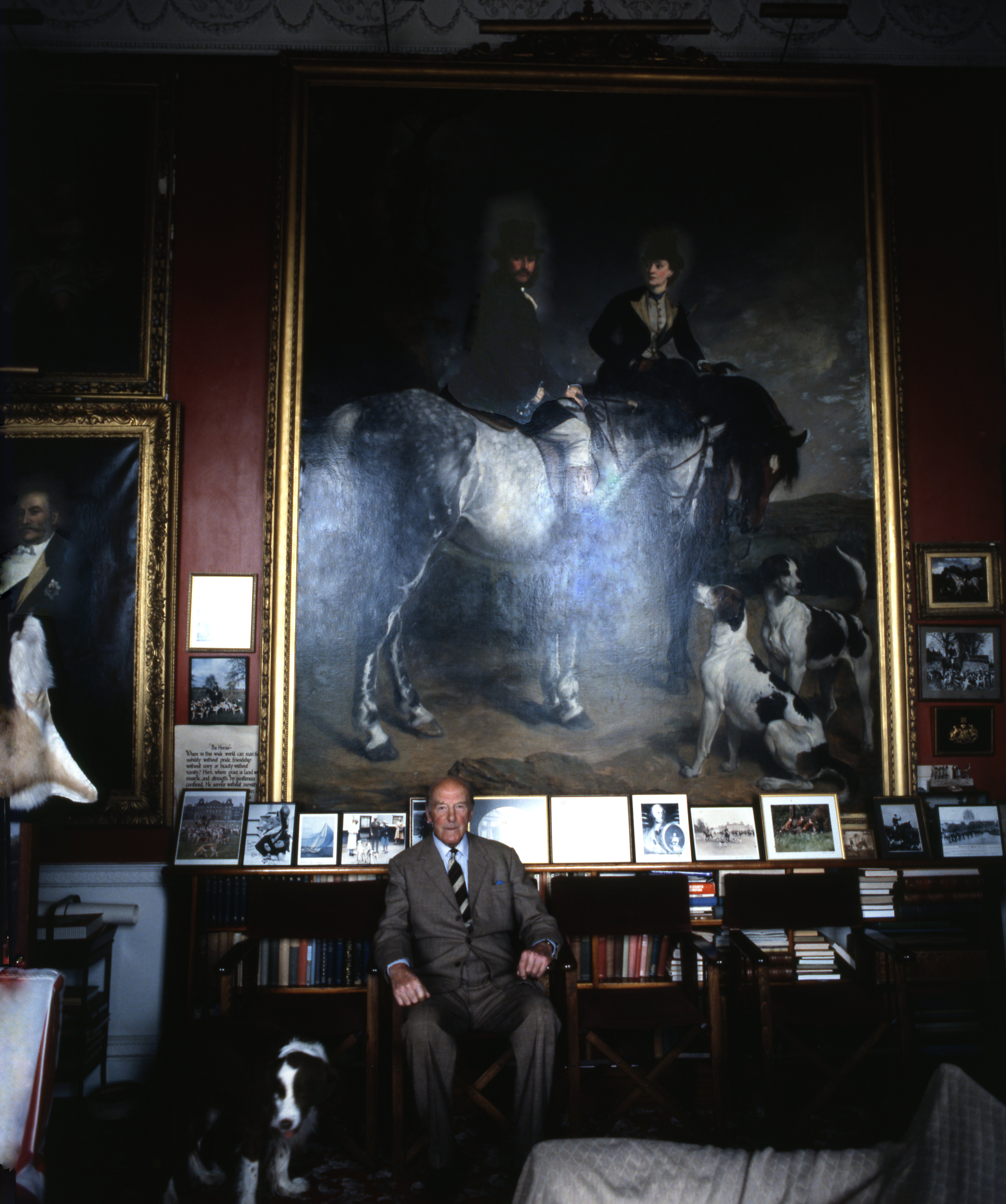
The tenth Duke of Beaufort, Master for sixty years

Hunting with hounds in the area dates back to 1640, primarily deer but also foxes, and was led by the Marquis of Worcester. In 1762, Henry Somerset, 5th Duke of Beaufort, decided to focus on foxhunting after an unsuccessful day hunting deer. From that point on, the Dukes of Beaufort have participated in the hunt, often acting as Master of the hunt. Henry Somerset, 10th Duke of Beaufort held the position for 60 years, gaining a reputation as "the greatest fox-hunter of the twentieth century", and was eventually known simply by the nickname, 'Master'.

The present master of the hunt is Henry Somerset, 12th Duke of Beaufort.

== Hunt ==
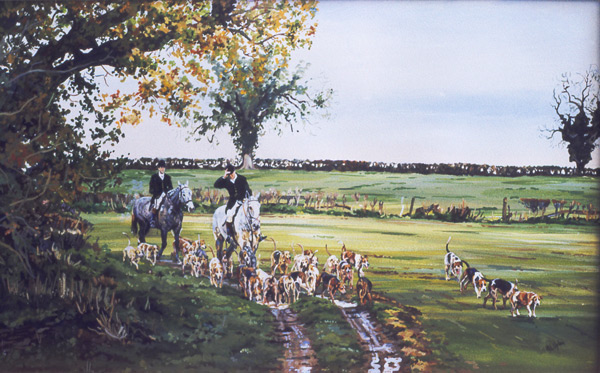
Moving On, scene by Mark Upton, 1996

The hunt country covers a 760 square miles (2,000 km^{2}) area of land between Cirencester and Bath to the north and south and between Malmesbury and Nailsworth to the east and west, although only 500 square miles (1,300 km^{2}) of land was usable by 2013. The hunt goes out on four days of the week during the hunting season, which continues for about 125 days of the year.

== Legal background and controversies ==
Although "hunting wild mammals with a dog" in its traditional form was made unlawful in England and Wales by the Hunting Act 2004, which came into effect in 2005, the Beaufort Hunt continues to hunt, taking advantage of exemptions stated in Schedule 1 of the Act, which allow some previously unusual forms of hunting wild mammals with dogs to continue, such as "hunting... for the purpose of enabling a bird of prey to hunt the wild mammal". Trail hunting and mounted exercising of hounds are both unaffected by the Act and consequently are favoured by many hunts in Great Britain. In 2005 the Beaufort changed its rules to ensure that it would hunt within the new law.

In October 2021, the Beaufort sparked widespread revulsion when footage shown on UK television depicted the hunt killing its own dogs by shooting them in the head. Tracey Crouch, a Conservative MP and co-chair of the all-party parliamentary group for animal welfare, said the footage was "absolutely heartbreaking" and "distressing", while Mike Jessop, a fellow of the Royal College of Veterinary Surgeons, said that from the footage, "There was no evidence of [the shooter] being veterinary trained or veterinary surgeons. The lack of use of any veterinary equipment that one would expect such as stethoscopes to ascertain the dogs were dead was just lacking."
