= Henry Seymour, Lord Beauchamp =

17th-century English nobleman

- Born: c. 1626
- Died: 14 March 1654 (aged 27–28)
- Spouse: Mary Capell (m. 1648)
- Children: 2, including William
- Father: William Seymour
- Relatives: Frances Darcy (sister); John Seymour (brother); Edward Seymour (grandfather); Robert Devereux (grandfather); Frances Walsingham (grandmother)

Henry Seymour, Lord Beauchamp (c. 1626 – 14 March 1654) was an English nobleman, third son of William Seymour, 2nd Duke of Somerset.

== Biography ==
Through his father's grandmother, he was a great-great-great-grandson of Mary Tudor, Queen of France and Charles Brandon, 1st Duke of Suffolk, thereby making him a direct descendant of Henry VII. He had two elder brothers, but they both died unmarried in their twenties, so that in 1646, when he was about twenty, Henry became heir to his father and took his courtesy title of Lord Beauchamp.

On 28 June 1648, he married Mary Capell at Hadham Parva in Hertfordshire; they had one son and one daughter. Like his father, he was a Cavalier, for which he was imprisoned in the Tower of London during the Commonwealth, 9 April to 9 September 1651, being released on £10,000 bond. He died 14 March 1654 and was buried at Bedwyn Magna 30 March, having died at "Tilsy" according to the burial record in the parish register.

His widow married in 1657 Lord Herbert, later created the 1st Duke of Beaufort.

His children were:

- William Seymour, 3rd Duke of Somerset (1654–1671)
- Lady Elizabeth Seymour (c. 1655 – 1697); she was granted the style and rank of daughter of a duke on 28 June 1672, and married Thomas Bruce, 2nd Earl of Ailesbury, on 31 August 1676. On her brother's death without issue, she became heiress of the estates of Tottenham and Savernake Forest, Wiltshire, and she also became representative as senior coheir (heir of line) of Princess Mary Tudor, through the families of Grey and Brandon. His descendants included Diana, Princess of Wales.

== Ancestry ==
Ancestors of Henry Seymour, Lord Beauchamp

Edward Seymour, 1st Duke of Somerset
Edward Seymour, 1st Earl of Hertford
Anne Stanhope
Edward Seymour, Lord Beauchamp of Hache
Henry Grey, 1st Duke of Suffolk
Katherine Grey
Frances Brandon
William Seymour, 2nd Duke of Somerset
Sir John Rogers
Sir Richard Rogers
Katherine Weston
Honora Rogers
Sir Andrew Luttrell
Cecilia Luttrell
Margaret Wyndham
Henry Seymour, Lord Beauchamp
Sir Richard Devereux
Walter Devereux, 1st Earl of Essex
Dorothy Hastings
Robert Devereux, 2nd Earl of Essex
Sir Francis Knollys
Lettice Knollys
Catherine Carey
Frances Devereux
William Walsingham
Sir Francis Walsingham
Joyce Denny
Frances Walsingham
Henry St Barbe
Ursula St Barbe
Eleanor Lewknor
