= Lady Mary Butler =

Lady Mary Butler (1689 – 2 January 1713) was the second daughter of the 2nd Duke of Ormonde by his second wife Mary, daughter of Henry Somerset, 1st Duke of Beaufort. She was born at Kilkenny Castle in Ireland.

She married John, 3rd Baron Ashburnham, on 21 October 1710. She died on 2 January 1713 in childbirth.

She was Jonathan Swift's "greatest favourite"; he wrote "I am in excessive concern for her death, I hardly knew a more valuable person on all accounts."
