= St Michael and All Angels Church, Badminton =

Church in Badminton, Gloucestershire, England

Coordinates: 51.5443°N 2.2800°W

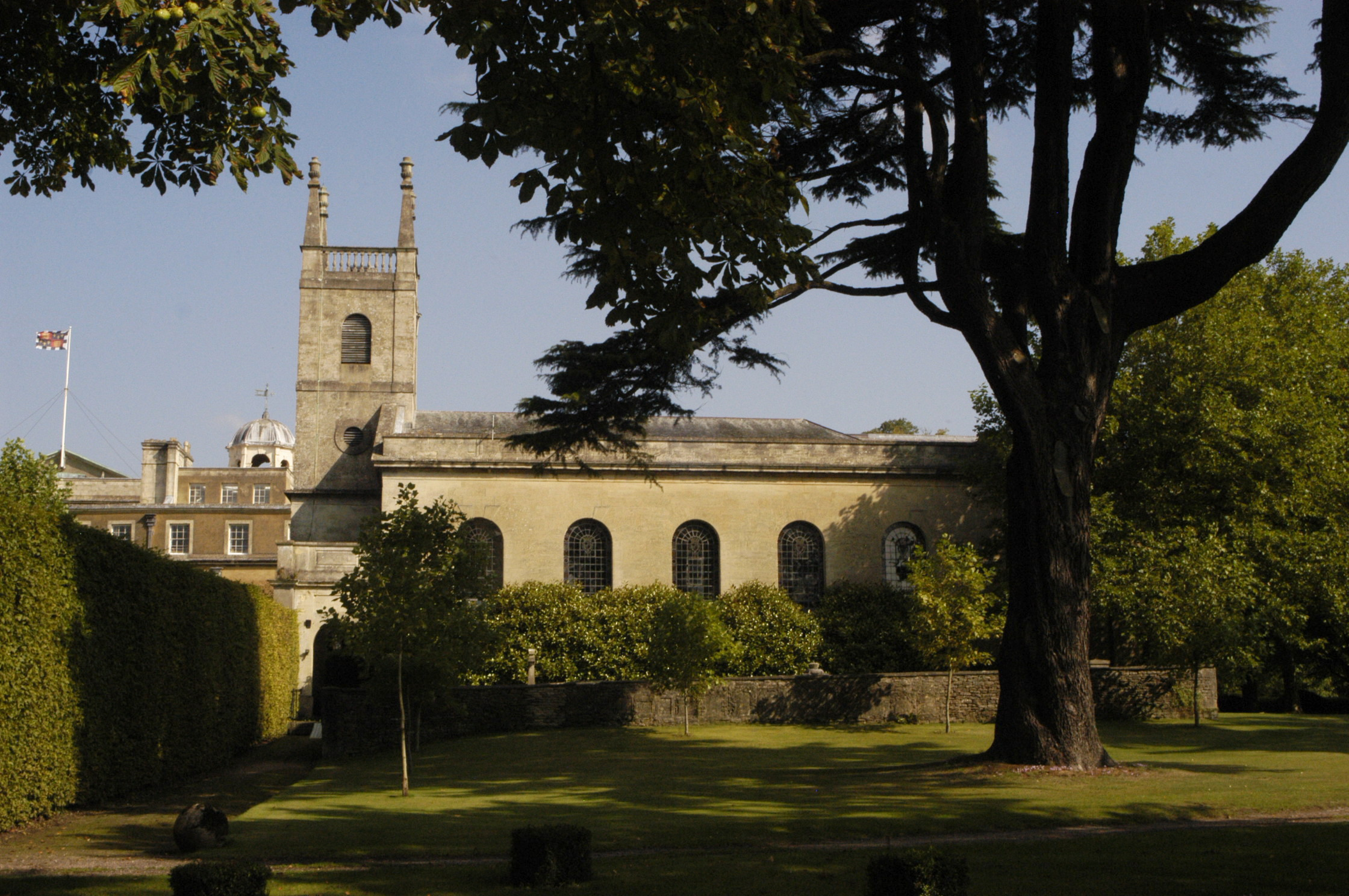
St Michael and All Angels

St Michael and All Angels is a Grade I listed church on the estate of the Duke of Beaufort in the village of Great Badminton, Gloucestershire, England. Attached to the Duke of Beaufort's residence, Badminton House, it is an active Anglican parish church in the diocese of Gloucester. Although within the grounds of the Badminton Estate, the church is owned, and its upkeep met, by the Badminton's Parochial Church Council, rather than the Ducal estate. There is a smaller church of the same name in the neighbouring hamlet of Little Badminton.

== Building ==
The current church was built in 1785 by Charles Evans in the style of St Martin-in-the-Fields, London, in miniature, but with a plain tower. The medieval predecessor church, which was then demolished, lay slightly further to the west.

The nave of the church has a tunnel-vault with ornamental panelled plasterwork and classical four-bay arcades and aisles with four small saucer domes. The chancel and apse were added in 1875 to accommodate the elaborate monument to Henry Somerset, 1st Duke of Beaufort by Grinling Gibbons. The 1st Duke was buried alongside his ancestors in the Beaufort Chapel in St George's Chapel, Windsor, but the monument was moved to Badminton in 1878.

Within the church, the pulpit and box pews date from 1785, while the organ case, choir stalls, reredos and communion rail were made by Temple Moore in 1908. The eight windows for the aisles, four on each side, have stained glass of 1846–1847 by Thomas Willement with heraldic designs, blue borders, and badges in the yellow of the Beaufort livery.

== Somerset family tombs ==
St Michael and All Angels serves as the principal burial place of the Somerset family of Badminton House. Until about 1910, the Dukes and Duchesses of Beaufort and distinguished relatives were buried in a vault under the church. The later Dukes and Duchesses were interred in the tiny churchyard.

Within the church, the monument to the 1st Duke of Beaufort (1629–1700) by Grinling Gibbons is now on the north side of the chancel, and consists of an effigy of the Duke in Garter robes, reclining on a sarcophagus and a plinth with relief of St George and the Dragon. There are twin Corinthian columns with embossed shafts, acanthus frieze, cornice with flaming urns, and the Duke's arms and supporters. At the top, 25 ft from the ground, is a tasselled cushion supporting a coronet; on the plinth are full-length female figures of Justice and Truth. Above the Duke's effigy, parted curtains show the heavenly host with palms and crowns. The Latin inscription displays the names of his family and the many offices he held. Two of his successors, the 2nd Duke (1684–1714) and the 3rd Duke (1707–1745), are commemorated in the East end of the north aisle by a splendid monument by John Michael Rysbrack, signed and dated 1754. The two dukes are depicted in Roman costume, one standing, the other seated on the sarcophagus and holding a medallion. Decorative, asymmetrical drapery hangs down over the sarcophagus.

Burials of members of the Somerset family in and near the church include:

- Lady Mary Sackville (1688–1705), daughter of the 6th Earl of Dorset, 1st wife of the 2nd Duke
- Lady Rachel Noel (d. 1709), daughter of the 2nd Earl of Gainsborough, 2nd wife of the 2nd Duke
- Henry Somerset, 2nd Duke of Beaufort (1684–1714)
- Mary Capell (1630–1715), daughter of the 1st Baron Capell, wife of the 1st Duke
- Henry Somerset-Scudamore, 3rd Duke of Beaufort (1707–1745)
- Charles Somerset, 4th Duke of Beaufort (1709–1756)
- Lady Anne Somerset (1673–1763), daughter of the 1st Duke, married the 2nd Earl of Coventry
- Henry Somerset, 5th Duke of Beaufort (1744–1803)
- Henry Somerset, 6th Duke of Beaufort (1766–1835)
- Henry Somerset, 7th Duke of Beaufort (1792–1853)
- FitzRoy Somerset, 1st Baron Raglan (1788–1855), youngest son of the 5th Duke, Field Marshal
- Emily Frances Smith (1800–1889), daughter of Charles Culling Smith, 2nd wife of the 7th Duke
- Henry Somerset, 8th Duke of Beaufort (1824–1899)
- Lady Georgiana Curzon (1825–1906), daughter of the 1st Earl Howe, wife of the 8th Duke
- Henry Somerset, 9th Duke of Beaufort (1847–1924)
- Henry Somerset, 10th Duke of Beaufort (1900–1984)
- Lady Mary Cambridge (1897–1987), daughter of the 1st Marquess of Cambridge, wife of the 10th Duke
