= Badminton House =

Country house in Gloucestershire, England

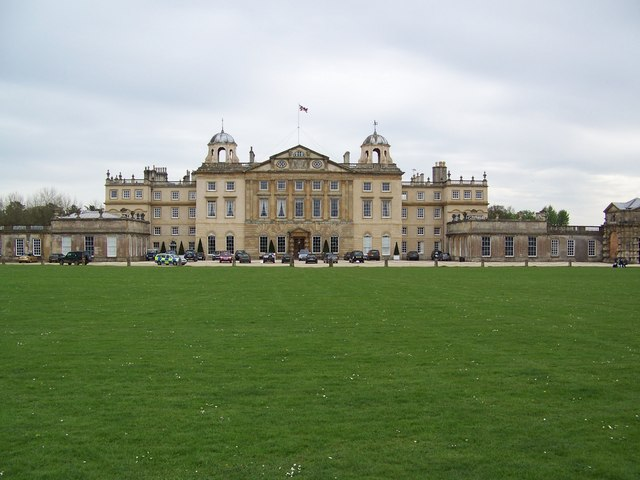

- Location within Gloucestershire
- 51.5449°N 2.2805°W
- Type: Country house
- Location: Badminton, Gloucestershire

History
- Built: c. 1660–1750 with earlier elements

Site notes
- Architect(s): Francis Smith of Warwick, James Gibbs, William Kent
- Architectural style: Palladian
- Governing body: Duke of Beaufort

Listed Building – Grade I
- Official name: Badminton House
- Designated: 17 September 1952
- Reference no.: 1320832

Listed Building – Grade I
- Official name: Worcester Lodge
- Designated: 5 September 1954
- Reference no.: 1349715

Listed Building – Grade II*
- Official name: Orangery, 50 yards southeast of Church of St Michael and All Angels
- Designated: 17 September 1952
- Reference no.: 1129313

Listed Building – Grade II*
- Official name: Castle barn, flanking dovecotes and screen walls
- Designated: 10 November 1983
- Reference no.: 1129344

Listed Building – Grade II*
- Official name: Laundry and dairy house 30 yards west of Badminton House
- Designated: 10 November 1983
- Reference no.: 1129315

Badminton House is a large country house and Grade I listed building in Badminton, Gloucestershire, England. It has been the principal seat of the Dukes of Beaufort since the late 17th century. The house, which has given its name to the sport of badminton, is set among 52,000 acres (21,000 ha) of land. The gardens and park surrounding the house are listed at Grade I on the Register of Historic Parks and Gardens.

== History ==
In 1612 Edward Somerset, 4th Earl of Worcester, bought from Nicholas Boteler his manors of Great and Little Badminton, called "Madmintune" in the Domesday Book of 1086, while one century earlier the name "Badimyncgtun" was recorded, held by that family since 1275. Edward Somerset's third son Sir Thomas Somerset modernised the old house in the late 1620s, and had a new T-shaped gabled range built. Evidence suggests he also had the present north and west fronts built up.

The Dukes of Beaufort acquired the property in the late 17th century, when the family moved from Raglan Castle in Monmouthshire; Raglan Castle had been ruined in the Civil War. The third duke adapted Sir Thomas Somerset's house by incorporating his several gabled ranges around the courtyard and extending the old house eastwards to provide a new set of domestic apartments. He had a grand Jonesian centrepiece raised on the north front. The two-bay flanking elevations were five storeys high, reduced to three storeys in 1713. Their domed crowning pavilions are by James Gibbs.

For the fourth duke, who succeeded his brother in 1745, the architect William Kent renovated and extended the house in the Palladian style, but many earlier elements remain. The Duke was instrumental in bringing the Venetian artist Canaletto to England: Canaletto's two views of Badminton remain in the house.

== Connections ==
Whether or not the sport of badminton was re-introduced from British India or was invented during the hard winter of 1863 by the children of the eighth duke in the Great Hall (where the featherweight shuttlecock would not mar the life-size portraits of horses by John Wootton, as the tradition of the house has it), it was popularised at the house, hence the sport's name.

Queen Mary stayed at Badminton House for much of the Second World War. Her staff occupied most of the building, to the inconvenience of the Duke and the Duchess of Beaufort. Afterward, when the Duchess, who was Mary's niece, was asked in which part of the great house the Queen had resided, she responded "She lived in all of it."

In the later 20th century, Badminton House became best known for the annual Badminton Horse Trials held there since 1949. Badminton House has also been strongly associated with fox hunting. Successive Dukes of Beaufort have been masters of the Beaufort Hunt, one of the two most famous hunts in the United Kingdom alongside the Quorn Hunt.

Weddings and parties can be booked at Badminton House. Occasionally, houses and cottage on the estate can be rented. The estate was the location for some scenes of the films The Remains of the Day, 28 Days Later and Pearl Harbor, and of the Netflix series Bridgerton, Queen Charlotte: A Bridgerton Story and The Gentlemen.

== Associated buildings ==
Except for the Grade I listed parish church and Worcester Lodge, all structures named below are Grade II* listed.

=== Parish church ===
Adjacent to Badminton House is the Grade I listed parish church of St Michael and All Angels, built in 1785. It serves as the principal burial place of the Somerset family; nearly all Dukes and Duchesses of Beaufort are interred here.

=== Domestic buildings ===
- The 11-bay orangery of 1711 by Thomas Bateman
- An early-18th-century laundry in Queen Anne style, now a house
- A similar brewery, also now a house
- The servants' wing southwest of the house, three ranges, late 17th century, altered and extended in the 19th
- Stables, barns and blacksmith's shop forming the four sides of the stable court, 1878, possibly by Thomas Henry Wyatt

=== Worcester Lodge ===
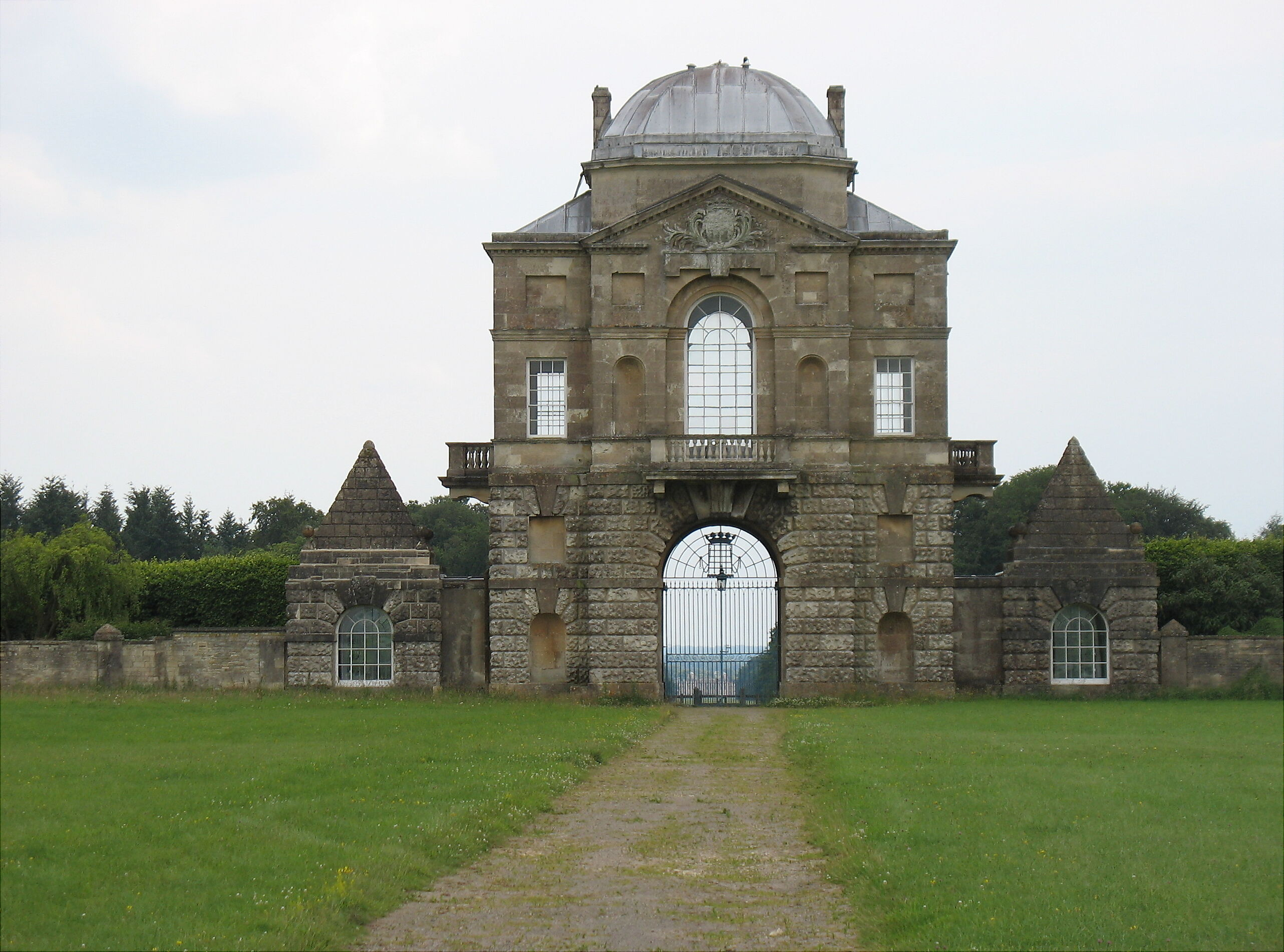
Worcester Lodge

At the north entrance to the park, near the Tetbury road and reached from the house by the Three Mile Ride, the Grade I listed Worcester Lodge was designed in 1746 by William Kent. The part-rusticated main block has four storeys. Over the high central archway is a dining room with generous windows and balustraded balconies; a pediment bears the Beaufort arms and the roof is partly domed. The room has a plaster ceiling by Kent, depicting fruit and flowers of the four seasons, described as very fine by Historic England. Kent also designed the convex mirror with a sunburst pattern. Outside, the ornamental flanking quadrant walls on both sides finish at small pavilions.

=== Other estate buildings ===
Several buildings and follies were designed by Thomas Wright of Durham, around 1750.

- West of the house, Castle Barn is a castellated range of buildings including a barn and two flanking dovecote towers
- In the deer park, the park-keeper's house is styled as a rustic cottage, one storey with attics
- Nearby, the Hermit's Cell or Root House is a small square wooden building with a thatched roof
- Lower Slait Lodge, at the northwest entrance, has two storeys in Gothic style with four hexagonal corner turrets
- Set on a motte at the end of a main drive from Badminton House is the folly known as Ragged Castle, now roofless and a building at risk

== Gallery ==
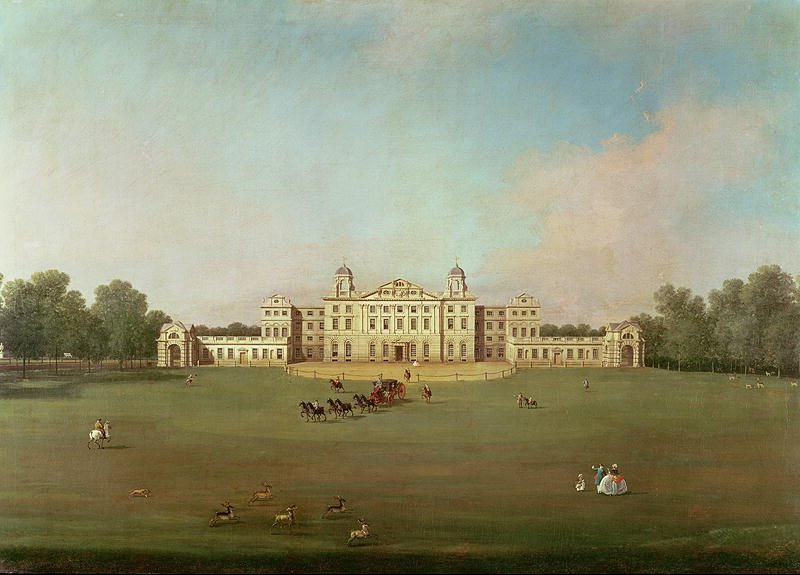
Badminton House in the 19th century

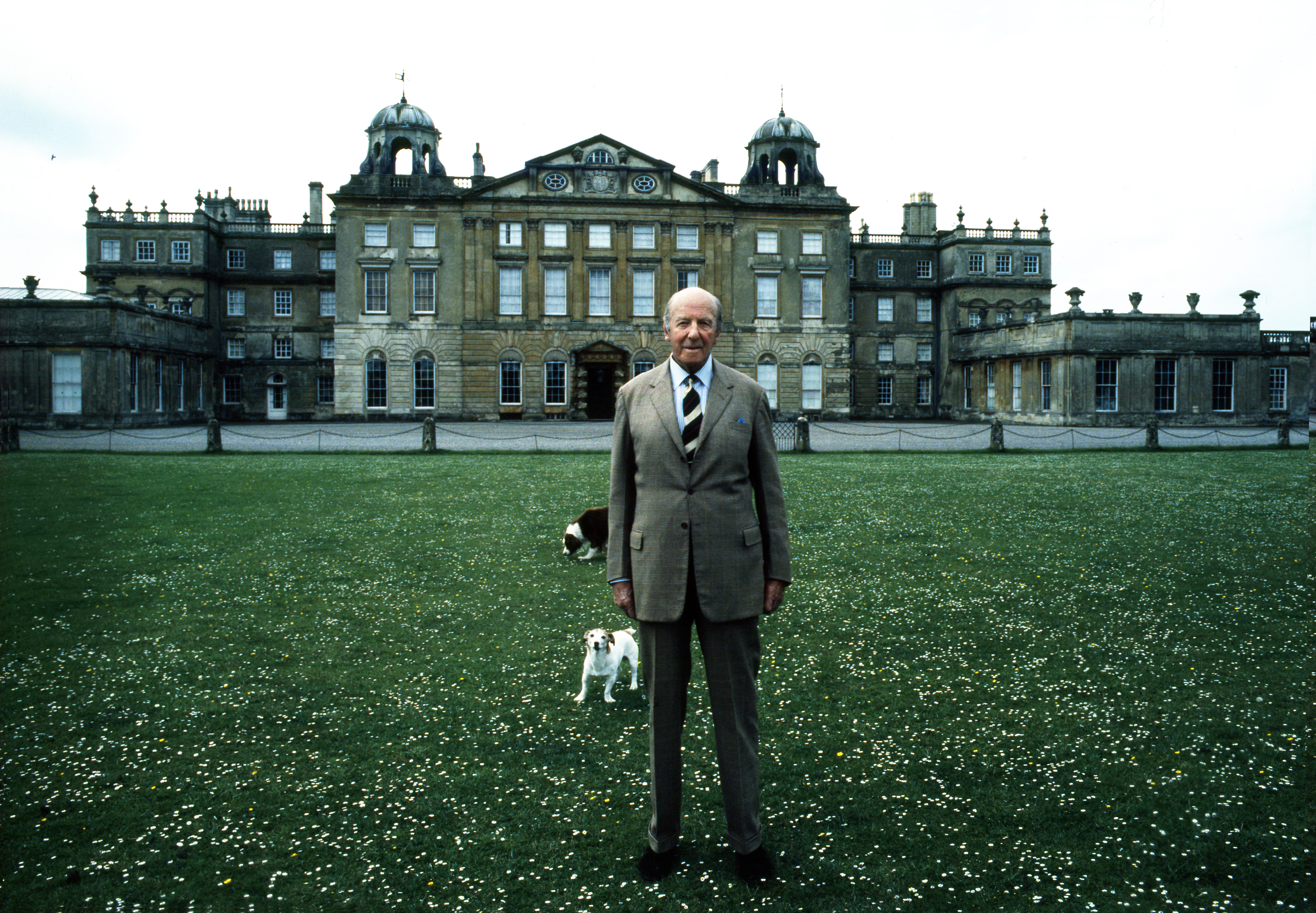
The 10th Duke (d. 1984) in front of the house

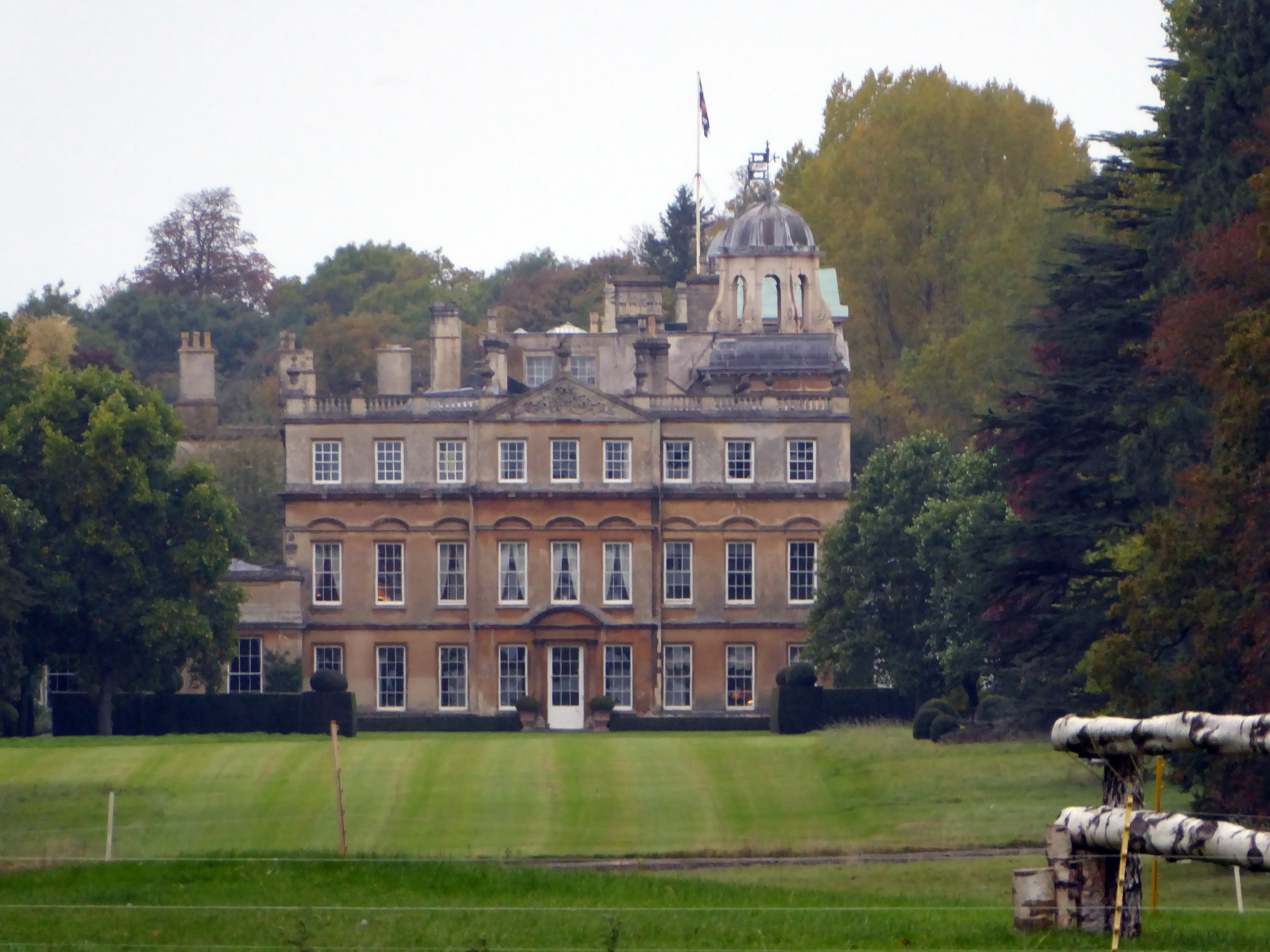
East façade

== See also ==
- Badminton Library
- Badminton cabinet
