= Mary Somerset, Duchess of Beaufort (sportswoman) =

British noblewoman (1897–1987)

Her Grace The Duchess of Beaufort CStJ
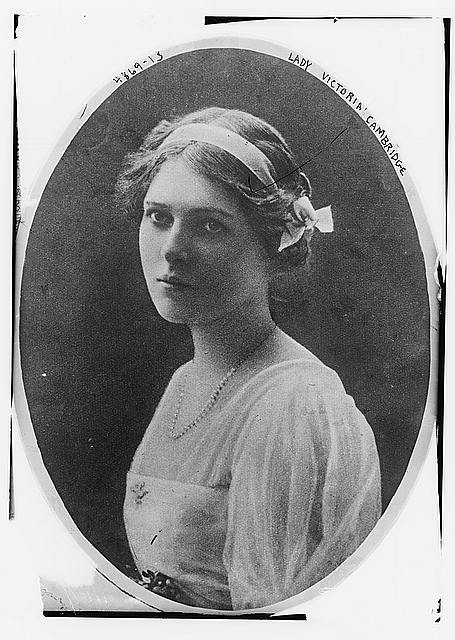
- Born: Princess Victoria Constance Mary of Teck; 12 June 1897; White Lodge, Richmond Park, Surrey, England
- Died: 23 June 1987 (aged 90); Badminton House, Gloucestershire, England
- Buried: St Michael and All Angels Church, Badminton, Gloucestershire
- Spouse: Henry Somerset, 10th Duke of Beaufort (m. 1923; died 1984)
- Parents: Adolphus Cambridge, 1st Marquess of Cambridge; Lady Margaret Grosvenor

Victoria Constance Mary Somerset, Duchess of Beaufort, CStJ (formerly Lady Mary Cambridge, née Princess Mary of Teck; 12 June 1897 – 23 June 1987) was a British peeress and sportswoman, who was born a member of the German nobility, settled in Britain. The elder daughter of the 1st Marquess of Cambridge and Lady Margaret Grosvenor, she was the niece of Queen Mary.

== Early life ==
Mary was born on 12 June 1897 at White Lodge, Richmond Park. She was the second child of the then Prince Adolphus of Teck and his wife, Lady Margaret Grosvenor. Her father's elder sister was Princess Victoria Mary, Duchess of York, later Queen Mary.

On her father's side, she was descended from the House of Teck, a morganatic branch of the German House of Württemberg, as well as from King George III; maternally, she was descended from the Grosvenor family.

In 1917, at the height of the First World War, when King George V's German relations living in the United Kingdom dropped their foreign titles, her father was created Marquess of Cambridge, Earl of Eltham and Viscount Northallerton. Princess Mary therefore became Lady Mary Cambridge.

Lady Mary was a bridesmaid at five royal weddings: the 1904 wedding of Prince Alexander of Teck and Princess Alice of Albany; the 1913 wedding of Prince Arthur of Connaught and Princess Alexandra, Duchess of Fife; the 1919 wedding of Princess Patricia of Connaught and The Hon. Alexander Ramsay; the 1922 wedding of Princess Mary and Viscount Lascelles; and the 1923 wedding of Prince Albert, Duke of York, and Lady Elizabeth Bowes-Lyon.

== Marriage ==
On 14 June 1923, she married Henry Somerset, Marquess of Worcester, later the 10th Duke of Beaufort, at St Margaret's Church, Westminster. Upon her marriage, she became Marchioness of Worcester and later Duchess of Beaufort when her father-in-law died in 1924. They had no children.

== Later life ==
During World War II, her aunt, Queen Mary, reluctantly decided to live with Mary and her husband at Badminton House, Gloucestershire. Queen Mary's staff occupied most of the house. After she left, Mary was asked which part of the house her aunt had lived in during her stay, to which she replied: "She lived in all of it."

The Duchess and her husband were both keen equestrians. In 1947, he began the Badminton Horse Trials at their home.

In 1968, Mary sat for a portrait by Cecil Beaton which is now in the photograph collection at the National Portrait Gallery, London. She was appointed a Commander of the Most Venerable Order of the Hospital of St. John of Jerusalem (CStJ).

Mary was widowed and became the dowager duchess in 1984. She continued to live at Badminton House, where she would occasionally sit in the staterooms to answer questions from tourists.

== Death ==
Mary died on 23 June 1987 at the age of 90, having lived with dementia in her later years. She is buried at St Michael and All Angels Church, Badminton.
