= English cricket team in the West Indies in 1910–11 =

International cricket tour

The sixth team of English cricketers toured the West Indies in the 1910–11 season. For the first time the MCC organised the tour. The team was captained by AWF Somerset and played a total of 12 matches, of which 11 are regarded as first-class, between February and April 1911.

== The team ==
A party of 11 was taken:

- AWF Somerset (captain)
- G Brown
- DCF Burton
- DSG Burton
- HL Gaussen
- JW Hearne
- BH Holloway
- SG Smith
- APFC Somerset
- TAL Whittington
- HI Young

APFC Somerset was the son of AWF Somerset, who had toured the West Indies with Lord Brackley's team six years earlier. DCF Burton and DSG Burton were cousins.

AC Johnston, LHW Troughton and GJ Thompson all withdrew from the published side and only 11 players were eventually taken on the tour. The team was thought to be quite weak but performed better than expected. The three professionals (Young, Brown and Hearne) were all good players although Brown and Hearne were inexperienced at this time. Sydney Smith, although a native of Trinidad, was playing county cricket and Tom Whittington was a regular for Glamorgan in the Minor Counties Championship. An inevitable constraint was that, with only 11 players touring, there were occasions when local players had to be used to complete the team.

== The tour ==
The team left England on the RMSP Clyde on 18 January 1911.

Matches played were:

- 8–9 February : v Barbados
- 10–11 February : v Barbados
- 15–17 February : v West Indies XI (in Barbados)
- 23–25 February : v British Guiana
- 27–28 February and 1 March : v West Indies (in British Guiana)
- 2–4 March : v West Indies XI (in British Guiana)
- 7–9 March : v Trinidad
- 10–12 March : v Trinidad
- 24–27 March : v Jamaica
- 28–29 March : v Jamaica
- 31 March and 1 April : v Port Antonio (in Jamaica) (not a first-class match)
- 3–5 April : v Jamaica

Of the 11 first-class matches, 3 were won, 4 lost, 3 drawn and 1 tied. The minor match was won. Unlike previous tours there were no matches in any of the smaller islands.

Starting in Barbados, the tourists lost the first two matches heavily but the match against a West Indies XI was won. The West Indies XI was without any Trinidad players because of quarantine restrictions.

In British Guiana the tourists won well with some good batting by Whittington and Holloway and they then beat the West Indian side. A second match against the West Indies was organised but when Archer was dropped the two other Barbados players refused to play.

The first match in Trinidad was played immediately after the tourists had got off the boat and they lost by an innings. The second match was closer although still won by Trinidad.

After the long trip to Jamaica the tourists played four matches there. Rain ruined the first two matches and after a win against Port Antonio the final match ended in a tie.

Sydney Smith was the leading player for the tourists being top of the bowling averages and second in the batting averages. Whittington and Holloway also batted well despite having only played one first class match between them before the tour started. Hearne was a success with the ball but Brown and Young were something of a disappointment. Despite being in his mid-50s the captain also turned out to be a useful bowler.

== Averages ==
The following averages are in the 11 first class matches:

- Batting
- Bowling

=== Batting ===
| Player | P | I | NO | R | HS | Ave | 100 | 50 | C/S |
|---|---|---|---|---|---|---|---|---|---|
| TAL Whittington | 11 | 20 | 2 | 678 | 154 | 37.66 | 2 | 2 | 8 |
| SG Smith | 11 | 21 | 3 | 547 | 81 | 30.38 | – | 5 | 7 |
| L Heath | 1 | 2 | 1 | 27 | 15 | 27.00 | – | – | 2 |
| BH Holloway | 10 | 17 | 0 | 416 | 100 | 24.47 | 1 | 2 | 9 |
| ELGN Grell | 1 | 2 | 0 | 42 | 25 | 21.00 | – | – | 1 |
| DCF Burton | 10 | 17 | 0 | 334 | 57 | 19.64 | – | 2 | 3 |
| JW Hearne | 11 | 21 | 2 | 344 | 56 | 18.10 | – | 2 | 13 |
| AWF Somerset | 11 | 17 | 5 | 214 | 60 | 17.83 | – | 1 | 10/2 |
| G Brown | 11 | 21 | 1 | 298 | 35 | 14.90 | – | – | 10/3 |
| HPL Gaussen | 10 | 18 | 0 | 260 | 77 | 14.44 | – | 1 | – |
| CO Simpson | 1 | 2 | 0 | 27 | 27 | 13.50 | – | – | 1 |
| HI Young | 11 | 19 | 2 | 225 | 73 | 13.23 | – | 1 | 5 |
| DSG Burton | 10 | 17 | 5 | 138 | 38* | 11.50 | – | – | 2 |
| GBM Liddlelow | 1 | 2 | 0 | 18 | 13 | 9.00 | – | – | – |
| APFC Somerset | 11 | 19 | 5 | 120 | 33 | 8.57 | – | – | 6 |

Grell, Heath, Liddlelow and Simpson were local players.

=== Bowling ===
| Player | O | M | R | W | BB | Ave | 5i | 10m |
|---|---|---|---|---|---|---|---|---|
| SG Smith | 300.2 | 57 | 845 | 47 | 6–42 | 17.97 | 3 | 1 |
| HI Young | 204 | 41 | 517 | 25 | 5–61 | 20.68 | 1 | – |
| JW Hearne | 398.4 | 62 | 1450 | 67 | 7–68 | 21.64 | 6 | 2 |
| APFC Somerset | 144.3 | 16 | 558 | 24 | 5–62 | 23.25 | 1 | – |
| G Brown | 106 | 15 | 409 | 9 | 3–26 | 45.44 | – | – |

== External sources ==
- CricketArchive

== Annual reviews ==
- Wisden Cricketers' Almanack 1912
