= Arthur Somerset Sr. =

English cricketer

Arthur Somerset
Personal information
- Full name: Arthur William FitzRoy Somerset
- Born: 20 September 1855; Brompton, Chatham, Kent, England
- Died: 8 January 1937 (aged 81); Castle Goring, Worthing, Sussex, England
- Batting: Right-handed
- Bowling: Right-arm fast-medium
- Relatives: Arthur Somerset junior (son)

Career statistics
| Competition | FC |
|---|---|
| Matches | 48 |
| Runs scored | 1221 |
| Batting average | 20.01 |
| 100s/50s | 0/7 |
| Top score | 68* |
| Balls bowled | 108 |
| Wickets | 2 |
| Bowling average | 26.50 |
| 5 wickets in innings | 0 |
| 10 wickets in match | 0 |
| Best bowling | 2/37 |
| Catches/stumpings | 41/7 |
- Source: CricInfo, 25 July 2010

Arthur William FitzRoy Somerset (20 September 1855 – 8 January 1937) was an English first-class cricketer.

Somerset was born in Chatham, Kent, and educated at Wellington College, Berkshire. After some years in Australia he returned to England in 1881, living in Castle Goring, a country house now in the town of Worthing in Sussex, and former home of Sir Bysshe Shelley, grandfather of the poet Percy Bysshe Shelley. He was well known for his hospitality at Castle Goring. He died there in January 1937, aged 81.

Somerset was a batsman who also bowled fast occasionally in his early years and kept wicket occasionally later. He played 48 games of first-class cricket between 1891 and 1913, some of them in England for Sussex and other teams. Most of his first-class cricket was played on three tours of the West Indies: with Lord Brackley's XI in 1904–05, and on two Marylebone Cricket Club tours which he also captained, in 1910–11 and 1912–13. His highest score was 68 not out against Jamaica on the 1904–05 tour.

== Family ==
Somerset was the son of Colonel FitzRoy Molyneux Henry Somerset and Jemima Drummond Nairne. He was the great-grandson of Henry Somerset, 5th Duke of Beaufort through his seventh son Lord William Somerset.

He married his second cousin Gwendolin Adelaide Katherine Georgiana Matilda Somerset, daughter of Sir Alfred Plantagenet Frederick Charles Somerset (only son of Lord John Somerset) and Adelaide Harriet Brooke-Pechell, on 25 July 1887. They had two children:

1. Adelaide Millicent Blanche Gwendolin Somerset (13 October 1888 – 20 January 1958)
2. Arthur Plantagenet Francis Cecil Somerset (28 September 1889 – 13 October 1957)
3. Lieutenant FitzRoy Aubrey Somerset (21 December 1892 – 7 July 1916), killed in action in the First World War

He held the offices of Deputy Lieutenant of Sussex and Justice of the Peace.
