= English cricket team in the West Indies in 1912–13 =

The seventh team of English cricketers toured the West Indies in the 1912–13 season. The tour was organised by MCC. As in 1910–11, the team was captained by AWF Somerset. The tour involved a total of 9 matches, all of which are regarded as first-class, between January and March 1913.

== The players ==
A party of 13 was taken:

- Arthur Somerset senior, Captain
- Cecil Burton
- Bernard Dobson
- George Docker
- Mordaunt Doll
- Sydney Fairbairn
- Punter Humphreys
- Arthur Jaques
- Albert Relf
- Sydney Smith
- Razor Smith
- Arthur Somerset junior
- Tom Whittington

Arthur Somerset senior, his son Arthur Somerset junior, Burton, Sydney Smith and Whittington had toured with the previous MCC team of 1910–11. Three good professionals were included, Humphreys, Relf and Razor Smith. Burton, Sydney Smith and Whittington had performed well on the previous tour and were arguably the best of the amateurs. As in the previous MCC tour the remaining players had little first-class experience. Despite being 57 years old the captain kept wicket in all the matches.

== The tour ==
The side arrived in Barbados on the RMS Magdalena on 27 January.

Matches played were:

- 30–31 January and 1 February : v Barbados
- 3–5 February : v Barbados
- 6–8 February : v West Indies XI (in Barbados)
- 14–16 February : v Trinidad
- 17–19 February : v Trinidad
- 20–22 February : v West Indies XI (in Trinidad)
- 1–4 March : v British Guiana
- 6–8 March : v West Indies XI (in British Guiana)
- 11–13 March : v British Guiana

Of the nine first class matches played in Barbados, Trinidad and British Guiana, five were won, three lost and one drawn.

The tourists lost the first two matches against Barbados by an innings but then defeated a West Indies XI with Humphreys taking 13 wickets.

Moving on to Trinidad, the tourists won the first match but were lucky to draw the second. In the second match against the West Indies XI, Ince made 167 for the home side and they won by an innings. Cumberbatch was bowled when he shouldered his bat because he had been distracted by leaves blowing across the pitch. Given out by the umpire, he appealed to Somerset and was allowed to continue his innings, a sporting gesture by the captain. Burton and the captain added 89 for the last wicket in the MCC second innings and were only separated with 20 minutes remaining.

In British Guiana, the two matches against the colony were won comfortably and the third match against the West Indies XI was also won by 10 wickets with Humphreys scoring a century adding 152 with Whittington. Jaques and the captain added 80 for the last wicket. Moulder carried his bat in the West Indies second innings.

The three professionals headed the batting averages and, with Sydney Smith, took most of the wickets. Burton, Whittington and Sydney Smith also performed well with the bat.

== Averages ==
The following averages are from the 9 first class matches (Batting Bowling).

=== Batting ===
Player	P	I	NO	R	HS	Ave	100	50	C/S
AE Relf	9	15	2	538	92	41.38	–	4	10
E Humphreys	9	15	1	561	106	40.07	2	1	8
WC Smith	4	6	2	132	126	33.00	1	–	7
DCF Burton	8	13	1	378	71	31.50	–	3	4
TAL Whittington	6	9	0	252	62	28.00	–	3	2
SG Smith	9	15	1	354	71	25.28	–	3	6
AWF Somerset	9	13	4	192	55*	21.33	–	1	9/2
SG Fairbairn	8	14	2	241	62*	20.08	–	1	3
MHC Doll	8	13	0	239	52	18.38	–	2	3
BP Dobson	7	13	2	159	55*	14.45	–	1	2
GAM Docker	7	11	2	129	36*	14.33	–	–	2
A Jaques	8	13	4	106	48	11.77	–	–	10
APFC Somerset	7	11	1	97	34	9.70	–	–	2

=== Bowling ===
Player	O	M	R	W	BB	Ave	5i	10m
E Humphreys	250.5	54	670	40	7–75	16.75	5	1
SG Smith	220	60	532	29	6–45	18.34	1	–
AE Relf	204.5	55	506	22	5–32	23.00	1	–
A Jaques	40	6	145	5	2–31	29.00	–	–
SG Fairbairn	100	14	373	12	3–55	31.08	–	–
MHC Doll	66.2	11	291	9	5–52	32.33	1	–
GAM Docker	35	0	169	5	2–66	33.80	–	–
WC Smith	96	25	268	5	2–116	53.60	–	–
APFC Somerset	67	7	254	4	2–45	63.50	–	–

== External sources ==
- CricketArchive

== Annual reviews ==
- Wisden Cricketers' Almanack 1914
