= Alfred Somerset =

English aristocrat and British Army officer

Sir Alfred Somerset
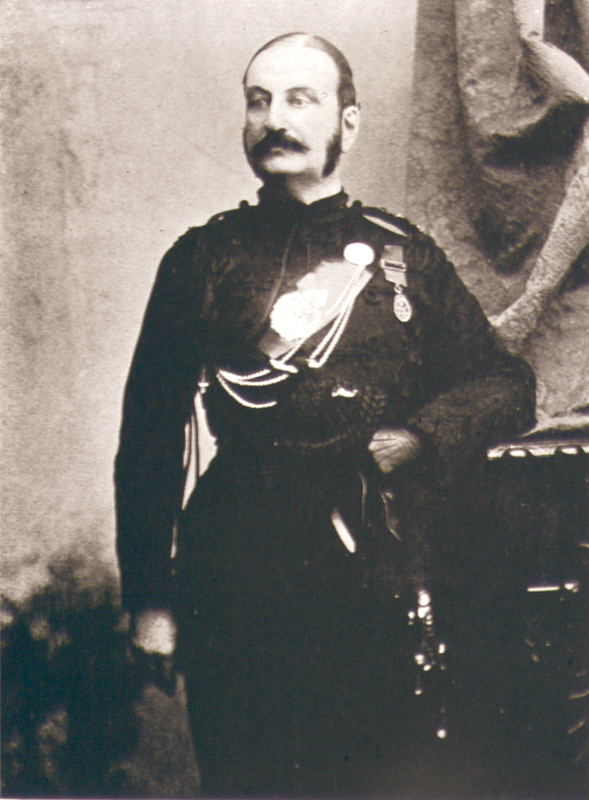
- Born: Alfred Plantagenet Frederick Charles Somerset; 5 September 1829; Hempsted Court, Gloucestershire
- Died: 26 March 1915 (aged 85); Enfield, London
- Spouse: Adelaide Brooke-Pechell (m. 1857–1915)
- Military career
- Allegiance: United Kingdom
- Branch: British Army
- Rank: Honorary Colonel
- Units: 52nd Oxfordshire Light Infantry; 13th (1st Somersetshire) Light Infantry
- Commands: King's Own Royal Tower Hamlets Militia; Central London Rifle Rangers

Col. Sir Alfred Plantagenet Frederick Charles Somerset KCB DL JP (5 September 1829 – 26 March 1915) was a British Army officer, coach driver, and aristocrat from the House of Beaufort. He was an influential resident in Enfield Town, and was a Justice of the Peace for Middlesex for 60 years.

== Family ==
Somerset was born at Hempsted Court in Gloucestershire, the only surviving son of Col. Lord John Somerset and Lady Catherine Annesley, daughter of Arthur Annesley, 1st Earl of Mountnorris. His father was the eighth son of Henry Somerset, 5th Duke of Beaufort by Elizabeth Boscawen; among his brothers was Field Marshal Lord Raglan, commander of the heavy cavalry at the Battle of Waterloo. Alfred's sister Frances was married to the banker James Whatman Bosanquet.

== Military career ==
Somerset was gazetted in January 1847, at age 17, to the 52nd Oxfordshire Light Infantry. Four months later, he was transferred to the 13th Light Infantry, with which he served in Ireland, Scotland, and on foreign service.

In 1859, amid growing fear that Napoleon III's Second French Empire would invade Britain, the Royal Commission on the Defence of the United Kingdom led to the introduction of Volunteer Forces. In 1860, Somerset raised the 35th Middlesex, a company of civilians in Enfield.

The following year, he took command the 40th, formed from legal professionals from eight companies at Gray's Inn, which absorbed the 35th. The new battalion was renamed the Central London Rifle Rangers; later known as The Rangers, it would operate for a century, sending battalions to both world wars.

In 1864, Somerset was promoted to major of the Central London Rifle Rangers. In 1866, he was promoted to Lieutenant-Colonel Commandant of the West Middlesex Rifle Volunteer Corps, and five years later to Honorary Colonel.

He also remained active outside the Volunteer Corps and was for many years commander of the King's Own Royal Tower Hamlets Militia (now the 7th Battalion Rifle Brigade).

== Enfield ==
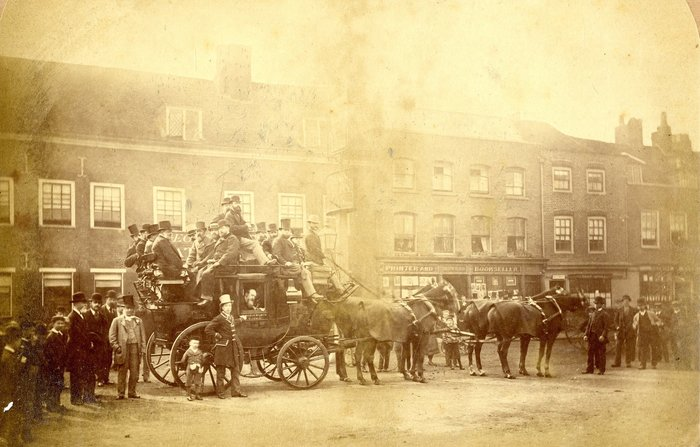
Sir Arthur Somerset driving his Hirondelle coach, Enfield Town, London, c.1875

For more than 60 years, Somerset made his home in Enfield Town, Middlesex (now North London), where he was greatly dedicated to improving the welfare of the citizens. He was a Justice of the Peace for six decades.

In 1852, he inherited Enfield Court, a two-storey brick building on Baker Street, parts of which dated to 1690. It has belonged to his godfather Sir James Wedderburn-Webster (who was also his uncle, married to his mother's sister Lady Frances Webster). Somerset made significant improvements to the house, which is now Grade II-listed. Since 1924, it has house the lower house of Enfield Grammar School.

Somerset was a coaching enthusiast, a popular pastime in Victorian and Edwardian England, and was a member of the Four-in-Hand Driving Club and the Coaching Club in Hyde Park.

Somerset was the owner of l'Hirondelle, a French-made four-in-hand coach with seating for more than 20 passengers. He set up a regular service for the Hirondelle, driving it from Enfield to Luton and Hitchin and back in the late 1870s with his chestnut horses. The coach left The George coaching inn in Enfield at 10:45 am and arrived at Hitchin's The Sun at 1:30 pm.

The Enfield Court Riding House on his estate, built as a riding school, was frequently opened to the public for free and it became a popular a dancing and musical venue in Enfield. Once a week, the Enfield Town Silver Prize Band entertained audiences. With capacity for nearly 700, it was the site of fancy dress ball during the Coronation of Edward VII and Alexandra.

== Honours ==
Somerset was appointed a Companion of the Order of the Bath (CB) by Queen Victoria in 1892. He was knighted in the same order at the 1902 Coronation Honours.

== Personal life ==
In 1857, Somerset married Adelaide Harriet, daughter of Vice-Admiral George Brooke-Pechell. Adelaide inherited Goring Castle from her father, who had bought it from Mary Shelley, and it remained in the Somerset family until the 21st century.

They had one daughter, Gwendolin Adelaide Katherine Georgiana Matilda, who married her second cousin Arthur William FitzRoy Somerset, son of Alfred's uncle Lord William Somerset.

He died in 1915 at Enfield Court.
