= Arthur Somerset =

Arthur Somerset may refer to:

- Lord Arthur Somerset (1671–1743), of Poston Court, Vowchurch, second son of Henry Somerset, 1st Duke of Beaufort
- Lord Arthur John Henry Somerset (1780–1816), politician
- Lord Henry Arthur George Somerset (1851–1926), British aristocrat
- Arthur Somerset Sr. (1855–1937), English cricketer
- Arthur Somerset Jr. (1889–1957), English cricketer, son of the above
