= David Burton =

David Burton may refer to:

- H. David Burton (born 1938), American leader in The Church of Jesus Christ of Latter-day Saints
- David Cecil Burton (1887–1971), cricketer and captain of Yorkshire CCC
- David Burton (cricketer, born 1985) (born 1985), English fast bowler
- David Burton (cricketer, born 1888) (1888–1948), first-class cricketer and cousin of Cecil (above)
- David Burton (botanist) (died 1792), botanist and surveyor in early colonial New South Wales
- David Burton (lawyer), professor at University of Maryland and partner of The Argus Group, see Americans For Fair Taxation
- David Burton (director) (1877–1963), American film director
- David H. Burton, American historian
- David Burton, a character in the video game Nemesis 3: The Eve of Destruction
- David "Pan The Gypsy" Burton, former rhythm guitarist and songwriter for the rock band Black Veil Brides

== See also ==
- David Bruton (disambiguation)
