= Lady Cathleen Hudson =

British noble

Lady Cathleen Blanche Lily Hudson (née Eliot; 29 July 1921 – 5 October 1994), also known as Lady Cathleen Seyfried, was a British noble. She was the younger daughter of John Granville Cornwallis Eliot, 6th Earl of St Germans and Lady Blanche Linnie Somerset, daughter of the 9th Duke of Beaufort. She was the mother of the present Baron Herbert.

Her father died from pneumonia on 22 March 1922, whilst recuperating in South Africa following a riding accident, leaving issue two daughters. His earldom and associated titles thus passed to his first cousin. Her mother, the widowed Countess, remarried George Francis Valentine Scott Douglas and had a son James Louis Fitzroy Scott Douglas (1930–1969), later Sir James Scott Douglas, Bt by her second husband; this half-brother died unmarried.

== Marriages ==
Lady Cathleen married twice:

- firstly, on 15 November 1946, Captain John Beeton Seyfried, Royal Horse Guards (1923–2008), and had issue, one daughter, and one son. The marriage was dissolved 1956.
1. Sarah Diana Seyfried, born 6 April 1949
2. David John Seyfried-Herbert, 19th Baron Herbert, born 3 March 1952 (see Barony of Herbert).
- secondly, on 7 January 1957, Sir Havelock Henry Trevor Hudson (1919–1996), and had a further daughter and son
1. Louise Deborah Hudson, born 2 December 1958,
2. Michael Guy Havelock Hudson, born 14 March 1962

== Claim and succession to the Barony Herbert ==
Her uncle, Henry Somerset, 10th Duke of Beaufort, died childless in 1984, and this made her the junior co-heiress, with the co-heiresses of her elder sister as senior co-heiresses, to the baronies Herbert and Botetourt. At her own death in 1994, this junior half-share in both baronies was inherited by her elder son David. The barony Herbert was eventually called out of abeyance in his favour in 2002; that of Botetourt still remains in abeyance.
