= Arthur Trollope =

English cricketer

Personal information
- Full name: Arthur Barnard Trollope
- Born: 31 July 1836; Eling, Hampshire, England
- Died: 22 April 1872 (aged 35); Cowlam, Yorkshire, England
- Relatives: Cecil Burton (Nephew), Claude Burton (Nephew)

Domestic team information
- Years: Team
- 1863: Hampshire
- 1861: Hampshire
- 1856–1857: Cambridge University

Career statistics
Competition	FC
Matches	3
Runs scored	62
Batting average	12.40
100s/50s	–/–
Top score	23
Balls bowled	–
Wickets	–
Bowling average	–
5 wickets in innings	–
10 wickets in match	–
Best bowling	–
Catches/stumpings	–/–
- Source: Cricinfo, 3 May 2010

Arthur Barnard Trollope (31 July 1836 – 22 April 1872) was an English cricketer.

Trollope was educated at Marlborough, Tonbridge and St John's College, Cambridge. He made his first-class debut for Cambridge University against the Cambridge Town and Country Club in 1856. Trollope made one further appearance for the university against the Cambridge Town Club in 1857. While playing for the university, he was severely injured by a catapult, an early bowling machine, and was unable to play in the Varsity match.

In 1861, he represented Hampshire in a single first-class match against the Marylebone Cricket Club. In 1863, he played a single non-first-class match for the newly formed Hampshire County Cricket Club against Surrey.

Trollope died at Cowlam, Yorkshire on 22 April 1872.

== Family ==
Trollope's nephews, Cecil Burton and Claude Burton both played first-class cricket.
