= George Docker =

English cricketer and British Army officer

Personal information
- Full name: George Arthur Murray Docker
- Born: 18 May 1876; Sydney, New South Wales, Australia
- Died: 17 November 1914 (aged 38); Touquet, Hainaut, Belgium
- Batting: Right-handed
- Bowling: Right-arm fast
- Relatives: Joseph Docker (grandfather); Arthur Docker (father); Ernest Docker (uncle); Cyril Docker (cousin); Keith Docker (cousin); Phillip Docker (cousin)

Domestic team information
- Years: Team
- 1911–1914: Marylebone Cricket Club

Career statistics
Competition	First-class
Matches	11
Runs scored	185
Batting average	11.56
100s/50s	–/–
Top score	36*
Balls bowled	210
Wickets	5
Bowling average	33.80
5 wickets in innings	–
10 wickets in match	–
Best bowling	2/66
Catches/stumpings	3/–
- Source: Cricinfo, 20 April 2021

George Arthur Murray Docker (18 November 1876 – 17 November 1914) was an Australian-born English first-class cricketer, British Army officer and barrister.

The son of Arthur and Florence Lucy Docker, he was born at Sydney in November 1876. Emigrating to England with his family, he was educated at Highgate School, before going up to Oriel College, Oxford to read law. However, he was unable to complete his studies as Docker volunteered for military service in the Second Boer War with the King's Own Royal Regiment, being commissioned as a second lieutenant in January 1900. He commanded a section of mounted infantry at The Battle of Zand River in June 1900, in addition to taking part in the actions at Ladybrand in September 1900 and the pursuit of Christiaan de Wet in the Orange Free State. Docker transferred to the King's Regiment (Liverpool) in August 1900, before being promoted to lieutenant in October 1901, the same year in which he transferred to the Royal Fusiliers. He received the Queen's South Africa Medal, with four clasps for his service in South Africa. He was invalided home in 1903, after suffering from rheumatic fever. He was appointed in April 1907 as an instructor of military law and administration to F Company at Sandhurst, a position he held until 1911. While instructing at the college, he was promoted to captain in September 1908.

A keen amateur cricketer, Docker was a member of the Free Foresters Cricket Club and the Marylebone Cricket Club (MCC) since 1898, playing first-class cricket for the latter. He made his first-class debut for the MCC in 1911 against Middlesex at Lord's, with Docker making a total of eleven appearances at first-class level for the MCC, including seven during the MCC tour of the West Indies in 1912–13. Docker scored 185 runs across his eleven matches, with a highest score of 36 not out. With his right-arm fast bowling he took 5 wickets. Docker also exceeded as a sportsman in polo and won prizes in both golf and athletics. Having returned to the Royal Fusiliers in September 1911, he was seconded to be an adjutant with the Middlesex Regiment in May 1912. He finally completed his legal studies as a member of the Inner Temple and was called to the bar in June 1914.

When the First World War began in July 1914, Docker was sent with the Middlesex Regiment to Sittingbourne, where he briefly commanded the 10th Battalion due to illness to the battalion colonel and his second-in-command. At the end of October 1914, the battalion were ordered to British India and were aboard their ship and ready to embark when at the last minute Docker was recalled by telegram to join the King's Own Royal Regiment on the Western Front. He left England on 8 November to take part in the First Battle of Ypres, reaching the 1st Battalion, King's Own Royal Regiment on 15 November. Docker entered the trenches the following evening near Touquet in Belgium and was killed in action on the morning of 17 November. He was survived by his wife and their four children.
