= International cricket in 1910–11 =

International cricket season

The 1910–11 international cricket season was from September 1910 to April 1911.

== Season overview ==
International tours
Start date	Home team	Away team	Results [Matches]			
Start date	Home team	Away team	Test	ODI	FC	LA
9 December 1910	Australia	South Africa	4–1 [5]	—	—	—
24 March 1911	West Indies	Marylebone	—	—	0–0 [3]	—

== December ==
=== South Africa in Australia ===
Test series
No.	Date	Home captain	Away captain	Venue	Result
Test 111	9–14 December	Clem Hill	Percy Sherwell	Sydney Cricket Ground, Sydney	Australia by an innings and 114 runs
Test 112	31 Dec–4 January	Clem Hill	Percy Sherwell	Melbourne Cricket Ground, Melbourne	Australia by 89 runs
Test 113	7–13 January	Clem Hill	Percy Sherwell	Adelaide Oval, Adelaide	South Africa by 38 runs
Test 114	17–21 February	Clem Hill	Percy Sherwell	Melbourne Cricket Ground, Melbourne	Australia by 530 runs
Test 115	3–7 March	Clem Hill	Percy Sherwell	Sydney Cricket Ground, Sydney	Australia by 7 wickets

== March ==
=== MCC in the West Indies ===
First-class Series
No.	Date	Home captain	Away captain	Venue	Result
Match 1	24–27 March	TB Nicholson	Arthur Somerset Sr	Sabina Park, Kingston	Match drawn
Match 2	28–29 March	TB Nicholson	Arthur Somerset Sr	Sabina Park, Kingston	Match drawn
Match 3	3–5 April	TB Nicholson	Arthur Somerset Sr	Sabina Park, Kingston	Match tied
