= Montpelier Bean Feast =

British food festival

Montpelier Bean Feast is an annual event taking place in Montpelier Park in Montpelier, Bristol, England. The emphasis is on celebrating community pride in the local harvest, heritage and creativity.

The original Montpelier Bean Feast was an 18th-century Bristol event. Local residents revived the event in 2009 as a family friendly community festival celebrating the local area. The event includes food, a produce exchange market, bean-themed games and competitions, arts and crafts workshops, live music performances and mock elections of King and Queen Bean. The event is supported by a small grant from Bristol City Council and the Quartet Community Foundation.

In the 18th century, Thomas Rennison a local entrepreneur styled himself Governor of the Colony of Newfoundland and, paradoxically, named his tavern the Old England. Pursuing this theme of independence, he held an annual beanfeast at which, in a parody of Bristol's civic ceremonies, a mock mayor, sheriffs and other dignitaries were elected and the ruled became the rulers. According to John Latimer, the author of "The annals of Bristol" in the 17th, 18th and 19th centuries, the none too abstemious revelers indulged in 'various high jinks'"
