= Bernard Dobson =

English cricketer

Personal information
- Full name: Bernard Patrick Dobson
- Born: 23 October 1873; Nottingham, Nottinghamshire, England
- Died: 17 May 1936 (aged 62); Crowborough, Sussex, England
- Batting: Unknown

Domestic team information
- Years: Team
- 1912/13: Marylebone Cricket Club

Career statistics
Competition	First-class
Matches	7
Runs scored	159
Batting average	14.45
100s/50s	–/1
Top score	55*
Catches/stumpings	2/–
- Source: Cricinfo, 28 August 2021

Bernard Patrick Dobson (23 October 1873 — 17 May 1936) was an English first-class cricketer.

Dobson was born at Nottingham in October 1873 and was educated at Stonyhurst College. A keen amateur cricketer, Dobson was a prolific batsman for the Free Foresters, Incogniti and Cryptics. He scored 1,500 runs for Incogniti in 1908 and the following year he was selected to tour Egypt with the Marylebone Cricket Club (MCC). He toured the West Indies with an MCC side captained by A. F. Somerset in early 1913, playing seven first-class cricket matches on the tour against Barbados, British Guiana, Trinidad, and the West Indies cricket team. He scored 159 runs on the tour, with a highest score of 55 not out against Trinidad. He was the assistant honorary secretary of Incogniti for over twenty years. Dobson died in May 1936 at Crowborough, following a short illness.
