= Baron Herbert of Raglan =

Baron Herbert of Raglan may refer to:

- Baron Herbert
- Duke of Beaufort
