= William Somerset =

William Somerset may refer to:

- William Somerset Maugham (1874–1965), English playwright, novelist and short story writer
- William Somerset, 3rd Earl of Worcester (1526–1589), English nobleman and courtier
- Lord William Somerset (1784–1851)
- Detective William Somerset, the main character in the 1995 film Seven, played by Morgan Freeman
