= Lord John Somerset =

English aristocrat and British Army officer

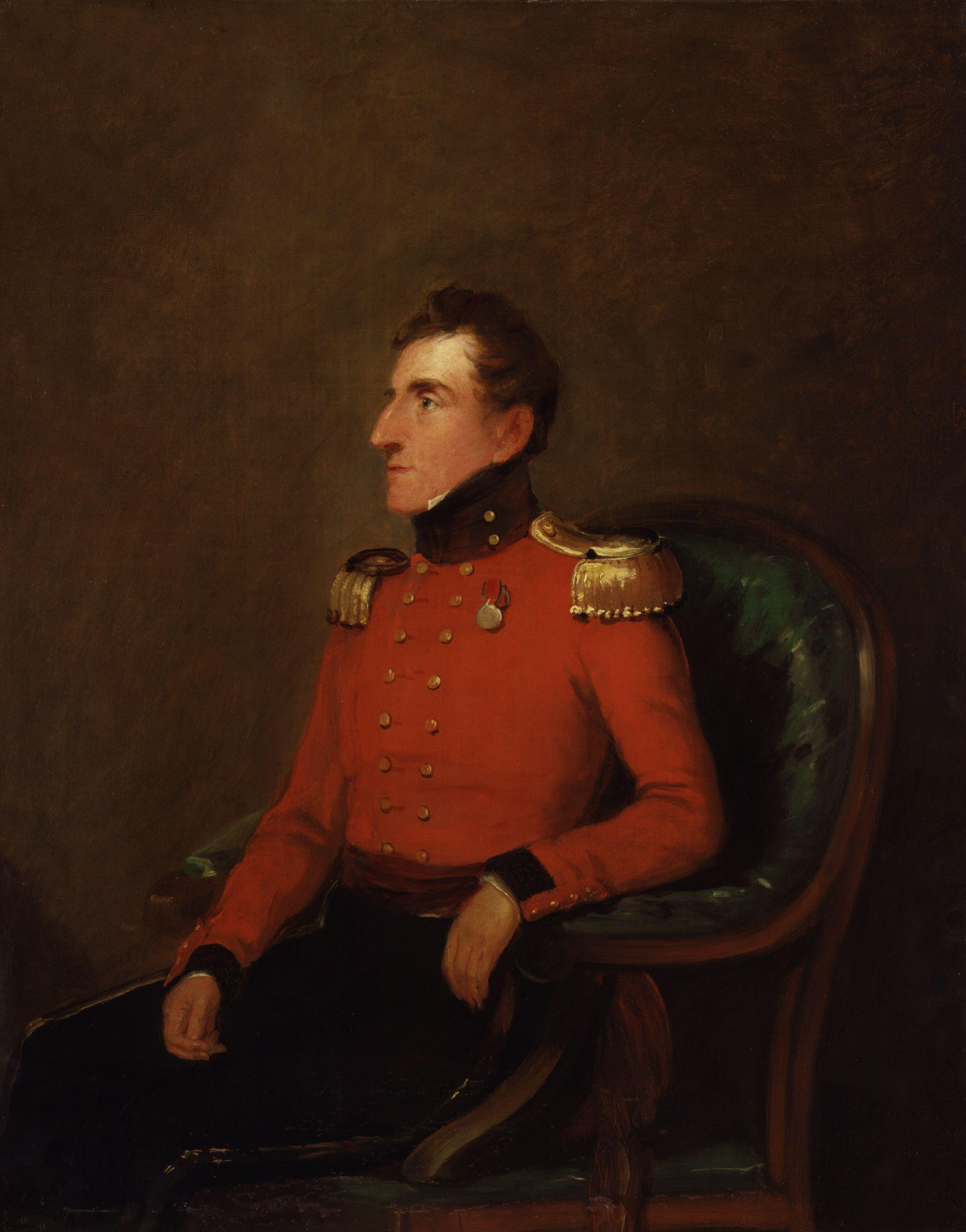
- Lord John Somerset by William Salter
- Born: Lord John Thomas Henry Somerset; 30 August 1787; Mayfair, London
- Died: 3 October 1846 (aged 59); Weston-super-Mare, Somerset
- Burial place: Bristol Cathedral
- Spouse: Lady Catherine Annesley (m. 1814–1846)
- Children: Sir Alfred Somerset
- Relatives: 5th Duke of Beaufort (father); 6th Duke of Beaufort (brother); Lord Charles Somerset (brother); Lord Edward Somerset (brother); Lord Arthur Somerset (brother); Rev. Lord William Somerset (brother); 1st Baron Raglan (brother)
- Military career
- Allegiance: United Kingdom
- Branch: British Army
- Rank: Colonel
- Wars: Napoleonic Wars; Peninsular War; Hundred Days; Crimean War
- Memorials: Bristol Cathedral

Col. Lord John Thomas Henry Somerset (30 August 1787 – 3 October 1846) was a British Army officer and aristocrat from the House of Beaufort. He fought in the Napoleonic Wars.

== Early life and education ==
Lord John was born at his father's house at 5 Grosvenor Square, Mayfair, the eighth son of Henry Somerset, 5th Duke of Beaufort by Elizabeth Boscawen, daughter of Admiral of the Blue Edward Boscawen.

His youngest brother was Field Marshal Lord Raglan.

He was educated at Westminster School from 1802–4 and was in Clapham's House.

== Military career ==
In August 1804, just shy of his 17th birthday, Somerset joined the 7th Light Dragoons as a cornet without purchase.

He was promoted to lieutenant in 1805 and captain in 1806. In 1808, he joined the 23rd Light Dragoons. He fought in the Peninsular War; he fought at the Battle of Talavera on the 22nd, 27th, and 28th of July 1809.

Somerset was transferred to the 23rd Regiment of Foot in 1813. He was promoted to brevet major in 1815, and served with De Watteville's Regiment. At the Battle of Waterloo, he was aide de camp to William, Prince of Orange. At Waterloo, his younger brother FitzRoy was military secretary to the Duke of Wellington.

He was promoted to brevet lieutenant-colonel in 1821, lieutenant-colonel in 1830, and colonel in 1837. In 1841, he was appointed inspecting field officer for the Bristol district.

== Marriage and issue ==
On 4 December 1814, while serving in Brussels as aide de camp to the Prince of Orange, Lord John married the Anglo-Irish aristocrat Lady Catherine Annesley, younger daughter of Arthur Annesley, 1st Earl of Mountnorris and Hon. Sarah Cavendish (a daughter of Sir Henry Cavendish, 2nd Baronet and Sarah Cavendish, 1st Baroness Waterpark).

The marriage was performed by The Ven. George Griffin Stonestreet, chaplain to the forces in the Netherlands. Lady Catherine was given away by the Prince of Orange. After the ceremony, they left for Ghent in a carriage drawn by four of the Prince's horses.

Lord and Lady John Somerset attended the famed Duchess of Richmond's ball on 15 June 1815, the night before the Battle of Quatre Bras.

They had seven children, four surviving:

- Wilhelmina Elizabeth Sarah (8 November 1815 – 25 August 1816), died in infancy at The Dower House, Stoke Park
- Frances Georgiana Elizabeth Somerset (7 November 1816 – 19 September 1862), married banker James Whatman Bosanquet
- Catherine Emily Harriet Somerset (16 July 1818 – 16 November 1841), died in Dordogne after a two-year illness
- John Henry Edward Somerset (22 September 1820 – 27 December 1822), died in infancy
- Norborne Fitzroy Somerset (3 September 1822 – 8 February 1823), died in infancy
- Juliana Lucy Sarah Somerset (13 July 1826 – 1 May 1853), married Henry Dalton Wittit Lyon
- Col. Sir Alfred Plantagenet Frederick Charles Somerset (1829–1915)

He resided for many years in Clifton, Bristol. After several months' illness, he died aged 59 at Weston-super-Mare, Somerset, where doctors had advised him to go for the sea air.
