= Lord High Steward of Bristol =

Civic office in Bristol, England (1542–1984)

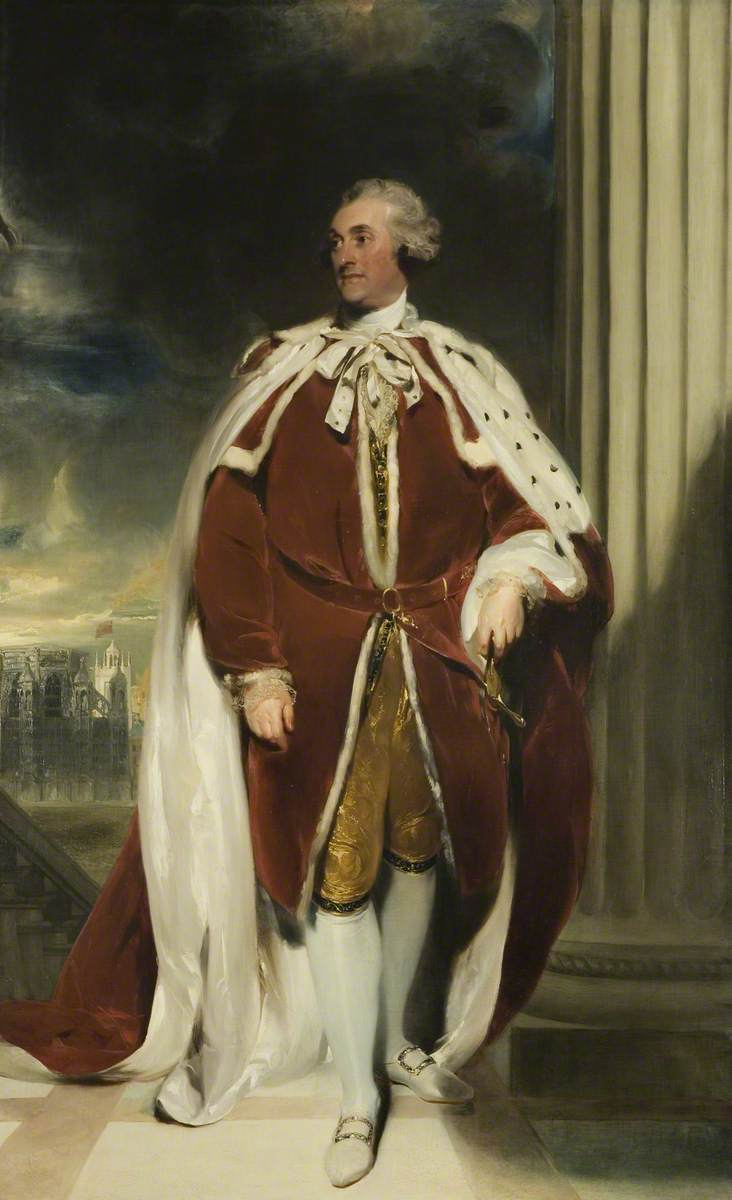
Portrait of the Duke of Portland as Lord Steward of Bristol by Bristol-born artist Thomas Lawrence. Commissioned by the Bristol Corporation in 1792.

Lord High Steward of Bristol was an office created and awarded by the Bristol Corporation, later known as Bristol City Council. The office was created following Bristol being conferred city status in 1542. The position has been in abeyance since 1984.

Prior to 1834 the post was typically awarded to a non-Bristolian but influential player at the Royal Court to help Bristol’s voice be heard in the corridors of power.

Post holders included British Prime Ministers the Duke of Portland and Lord Grenville, Elizabethan head of government Lord Burghley, Edward VI’s Lord Protector Edward Seymour, and Elizabethan favourites the Earl of Leicester and Earl of Essex. Oliver Cromwell was falsely reported by multiple sources to have held the title; he was nominated but withdrawn prior to a vote.

== History of the office ==
Sidney and Beatrice Webb said the role of High Steward was "of great dignity and some influence, but with practically no duties". It was a lifetime appointment, assuming good behaviour, and was initially paid £4 annually with two butts of sack, or a pipe of wine that the city councillors would taste test before dispatch. The office was elected by the Bristol corporation commonality, the assembled councillors. By the end of the seventeenth century the role of High Steward was considered to be "exclusively honorary".

=== Contradictory accounts of first office holder and year of creation ===
Nineteenth century Bristol annalists Latimer and Beavan both recorded that the first Lord High Steward of Bristol was Edward Seymour, in 1541, ahead of Bristol’s city status conferral in 1542. Bristol City Council’s renowned archivist Elizabeth Ralph noted this error in her translation of The Great White Book of Bristol that the first office holder was Sir Edward Baynton in 1542, after Bristol’s city status was granted.

Latham notes in his translation of Bristol’s royal charters from 1509-1899 that had the position of Lord High Stewarded existed in 1533 it would have been awarded to Thomas Cromwell, who instead was made Recorder of Bristol. Latham goes on to note that the position of Lord High Steward of Bristol was not created until the town became a city.

=== In the sixteenth century ===
Although not recorded in the Great White Book on the death of the first post-holder, Sir Edward Baynton, in 1544, Edward Seymour was appointed Lord High Steward. Seymour was Queen Jane Seymour’s brother and King Edward VI’s Lord Protector. Seymour headed up inquisitorial commissions to dispose of chantry estates and led the commission in Bristol to the corporation’s satisfaction.

Following the decapitation of Edward Seymour the Earl of Pembroke was elected his successor. Latham's Charters notes Letters Patent in 1550 from Edward VI appointing the Earl constable of the castle and keeper of the gate, as well as 'Steward of the city'. The Bristol corporation felt the Earl rarely represented them at court. They were, however, satisfied with Sir William after the outrage of Bristol soldiers being ordered to muster with the rest of the county of Gloucestershire, the Lord High Steward helped secure Bristol an independent commission.

In 1570 an ordnance was passed that the Lord High Steward of Bristol should be a Privy Councillor and should regularly attend court and Queen.

On the Earl’s death at least three potential successors emerged including Lord Chandos and the late Earl’s son. In 1570 the corporation picked Queen Elizabeth’s 'Robin', the Earl of Leicester. Latimer describes his "indifference" to Bristol concerns and the corporation’s limited success in using his influence.

=== In the seventeenth century ===
A succession of powerful couriers were made Bristol's "friend at court" for life around the turn of the century. This included head of government Lord Burghley, Elizabeth’s favourite the Earl of Essex and her most powerful minister Lord Buckhurst. After the accession of the house of Stuart to the English throne the need for an influential ally was seen as more urgent. In 1608 Robert Cecil was courted and along with a pipe of the wine for which Bristol was famed was sent £30 in hard cash. This was followed by the Lord Chamberlain in 1613 who appeared to advocate for the city in a trade dispute about London’s new monopoly on trade with Turkey. From 1630 Lord Treasurer was appointed as Bristol’s Lord High Steward and intervened to enable Bristol merchants to attempt, in 1631, to attempt to discover a north-west passage via Greenland.

=== Contradictory accounts of Oliver Cromwell's nomination ===
In 1789 Bristol annalist the Revered Barrett listed Oliver Cromwell as a Lord High Steward of Bristol. Oliver Cromwell also appeared in Reverend Beavan’s Bristol lists in 1899 and other sources in the period.

In 1900 annalist John Latimer castigated Barrett and noted that Cromwell had been nominated for the post, and withdrawn, and his rival Sir Henry Vane was elected. The latter lost influence shortly afterwards and was eventually replaced in 1650, ahead of his execution a year later. He was replaced by the Duke of Ormond then his grandson who between them served over 50 years. Latimer identifies just one highlight in this time: castigation of the Bristol corporation for supplying the Duke with a London sherry as part of his fee, rather than superior Bristol’s equivalent butt of sack.

=== Honorary era and abeyance ===
From 1684 Bristol’s new charter made Steward, along with Recorder and Town Clerk, subject to royal approval ahead of their election and subject to dismissal by the Privy Council. By the 1690s the role of Lord High Steward was seen as often more ambassadorial than political, such as the Duke of Ormond’s promoting Bristol’s trading interests when Viceroy of Ireland.

In 1715 the government ordered the Lord Lieutenant to quell a Somerset Jacobite plot at Bath. He was subsequently appointed Lord High Steward of Bristol before uncovering a Bristol Jacobite plot later that year. In 1737 the Lord Chancellor was appointed to the post until 1764, when it lay vacant until 1786, being conferred on past and future Prime Minister the Duke of Portland. In 1810 another former Prime Minister, William Wyndham, was appointed until his death in 1834. The Duke of Beaufort was appointed in 1834 from when the position was held by each duke until 1984 when it fell into abeyance.

== List of Lord High Stewards of Bristol (1542-1835) ==
From creation in 1542 to municipal reformation in 1835:

- 1542: Sir Edward Baynton: vice-chamberlain to Queen Anne Boleyn and brother-in-law of Queen Katherine Howard
- 1544: Edward Seymour, Earl of Hertford: Lord Protector of England in the reign of King Edward VI
- 1550: Sir William Herbert, Earl of Pembroke: brother-in-law of King Henry VIII and a guardian to King Edward VI
- 1570: Robert Dudley, Earl of Leicester: favourite of Queen Elizabeth I
- 1588: William Cecil, Lord Burghley: head of government, Lord High Treasurer;
- 1598: Robert Devereux, Earl of Essex: another favourite of Queen Elizabeth I
- 1600: Thomas Sackville, Lord Buckhurst: Lord High Treasurer
- 1608: Robert Cecil, Earl of Salisbury: spymaster and son and successor of William Cecil
- 1613: William Herbert, Earl of Pembroke: Lord Chamberlain
- 1630: Richard Weston, Earl of Portland: Chancellor of the Exchequer
- 1635: Philip Herbert, Earl of Pembroke and Montgomery: favourite of King James I
- 1650: Sir Henry Vane: a leading Parliamentarian during the English Civil War
- 1661: James Butler, Duke of Ormond: Lord Lieutenant of Ireland
- 1683: James Butler, Duke of Ormond (grandson): Lord Lieutenant of Ireland
- 1715: James Berkeley, Earl of Berkeley: First Lord of the Admiralty
- 1738: Philip Yorke, Earl of Hardwicke: Lord High Chancellor
- 1764: Vacant
- 1786: William Henry, Duke of Portland: Prime Minister
- 1810: William Wyndham, Lord Grenville: Prime Minister
- 1834: Henry Somerset, Duke of Beaufort
