= Arthur Docker =

Australian cricketer

Personal information
- Born: 3 June 1848; Thornwaite, New South Wales, Australia
- Died: 8 April 1929 (aged 80); Enfield, England
- Source: ESPNcricinfo, 26 December 2016

Arthur Docker (3 June 1848 – 8 April 1929) was an Australian cricketer. He played one first-class match for New South Wales in 1871/72. He was the fourth son of English-Australian pastoralist and politician Joseph Docker. His son, George, was also a first-class cricketer.

== See also ==
- List of New South Wales representative cricketers
