= David Burton (cricketer, born 1888) =

English cricketer

David Stuart Gaselee Burton (31 March 1888 – 24 January 1948) was an English first-class cricketer who played in ten matches for Marylebone Cricket Club (MCC) on the tour of the West Indies in 1910-11.

Born Stuart Gaselee Burton in Bath, Somerset, Burton batted mostly in the lower order, and did not make many runs. He did not bowl on the tour and never played first-class cricket again afterwards. His cousin Cecil Burton was also on the tour and later captained Yorkshire; Cecil's brother Claude played first-class cricket for Oxford University and Yorkshire.

Was awarded the Croix de Guerre for services during the First World War.

He died at Windsor, Berkshire, on 24 January 1948.
