= David Seyfried-Herbert, 19th Baron Herbert =

British peer (born 1952)

David John Seyfried-Herbert, 19th Baron Herbert (born 3 March 1952) is a British peer.

== Biography ==
He was born David John Seyfried, the son of Captain John Seyfried, Royal Horse Guards, and Lady Cathleen Eliot, daughter of the 6th Earl of St Germans. Lord St Germans's wife was Lady Blanche Somerset, daughter of the 9th Duke of Beaufort, descendant of William Herbert from whom the Barony of Herbert originated.

He was educated at Harrow School. He married, in 1975, Jane Bishop, daughter of Dr Ian Bishop. They have one son, Oliver Richard Seyfried Herbert, born 17 June 1976. Oliver was educated at Harrow School and St Bartholomew's Hospital. In 2003 he married Sarah (Sally) Victoria Fergusson, daughter of Ian Fergusson FRCS, and they have one son: Oscar James Seyfried Herbert, born 27 November 2004 and two daughters, Coco Florence Seyfried Herbert, born 23 July 2007 and Phoebe Sophia Seyfried Herbert, born 12 June 2008. They also have one daughter, Charlotte Sophia Caroline Seyfried Herbert, born 27 October 1977, educated at Wycombe Abbey School and Oriel College, Oxford. In 2007 she married Julian Collett and they have three sons; Rollo Huxley Herbert Collett born 14 July 2008, Caspian Huxley Herbert Collett born 2 November 2009 and Ludovic Huxley Herbert Collett born 29 September 2014.

In 2002 the Queen terminated the abeyance of the Barony of Herbert in his favour. He is also a co-heir, with one moiety, to the Barony of Botetourt.

== Notes ==
Peerage of England
In abeyance Title last held by Henry Somerset	Baron Herbert; 2002–present	Incumbent
