= David Bruton =

David Bruton may refer to:

- David Bruton (American football) (born 1987), American football safety and special teams player
- Dave Bruton (footballer) (born 1952), English former footballer

== See also ==
- David Burton (disambiguation)
