= Samuel Richard Bosanquet =

English barrister

Samuel Richard Bosanquet (1 April 1800 – 27 December 1882) was an English barrister, known as a writer on legal, social and theological topics.

== Life ==
He was born on 1 April 1800 into the Bosanquet family of Forest House, Essex, and Dingestow Court, Monmouthshire; the banker and biblical writer James Whatman Bosanquet was a younger brother. Educated at Eton College and Christ Church, Oxford, where he graduated with honours, a first class in mathematics and a second in classics, he took his B.A. degree in 1822, and proceeded M.A. in 1829. Called to the bar at the Inner Temple, he was one of the revising barristers appointed with the passing of the Reform Act 1832.

In 1843 Bosanquet succeeded to the family estates. He was for 35 years chairman of the Monmouthshire quarter sessions. A philanthropist, he promoted local institutions and enterprises.

Bosanaquet died at Dingestow Court, on 27 December 1882.

== Works ==
Bosanquet began by writing leading articles for The Times, besides contributing frequently to the British Critic.

=== Legal works ===
In 1837 he published an annotated edition of the Tithe Commutation Act 1836, and another in 1839 of the Poor Law Amendment Act 1834. The latter work had the object of showing that the prevalent dislike of the measure was due to a misapprehension of its provisions conceived and acted on by the agents of the poor-law commissioners.

=== Logic ===
In 1839 also appeared his New System of Logic and Development of the Principles of Truth and Reasoning applicable to moral subjects and the conduct of human life. In it he aimed at substituting for the Aristotelian logic one supplying a basis for a system of Christian ethics. To the second edition, 1870, he added two books, apply his logic to religion.

=== Poor laws debate ===
Bosanquet expanded two articles in the British Critic into The Rights of the Poor and Christian Almsgiving vindicated, or the State and Character of the Poor and the Conduct and Duties of the Rich exhibited and illustrated (1841). Destitution, he maintained, was in many cases not the fault of the poor. He illustrated this view by detailed statements, taken mainly from the reports of the Mendicity Society, to show the inadequacy of the incomes of numbers of the wage-earning classes for the maintenance of themselves and their families.

Following Thomas Chalmers, Bosanquet argued that individual charity, and not the state or a public legal provision, should supply whatever was deficient in the pecuniary circumstances of the poor.

=== Conservatism ===
In 1843 appeared his Principia, a series of essays on the principles manifesting themselves in these last times in Religion, Philosophv, and Politics. The work assailed modern liberalism and its results, intellectual and social, as interpreted by Bosanquet; who identified his age with those last times of national degeneracy and apostasy which were to precede the second advent. His Letter to Lord John Russell on the Safety of the Nation, 1848, showed the same spirit of hostility to modern liberalism, and a desire to substitute a paternal despotism for parliamentary government.

=== Theology ===
Theological works included:

- Vestiges of the Natural History of Creation, its arguments examined and exposed, denouncing Vestiges of the Natural History of Creation, second edition 1845;
- The First Seal: Short Homilies on the Gospel According to St. Matthew, 1854;
- The Fourth Seal: Being Short Homilies on the Gospel According to St. John, 1856;
- Eirenicon, Toleration, Intolerance, Christianity, the Church of England and Dissent, 1867, which pronounces an outward union of churches to be impracticable, and if practicable to be undesirable;
- The Successive Visions of the Cherubim distinguished and newly interpreted, showing the progressive revelation through them of the Incarnation and of the Gospel of Redemption and Sanctification, 1871 (typological exegesis);
- Hindoo Chronology and Antediluvian History, an attempt to synchronise the two, and to establish a connection between Indian mythology and the earliest figures of the Bible (a reprint, with notes by Bosanquet, of the first part of a Key to Hindoo Chronology, Cambridge, 1820, by Alexander Hamilton).

== Family ==
Bosanquet married Emily Courthope. They had ten children, including Frederick Albert Bosanquet.

== Notes ==
Attribution This article incorporates text from a publication now in the public domain: "Bosanquet, Samuel Richard". Dictionary of National Biography. London: Smith, Elder & Co. 1885–1900.
