= Portrait of the Duke of Portland =

1792 painting by Thomas Lawrence

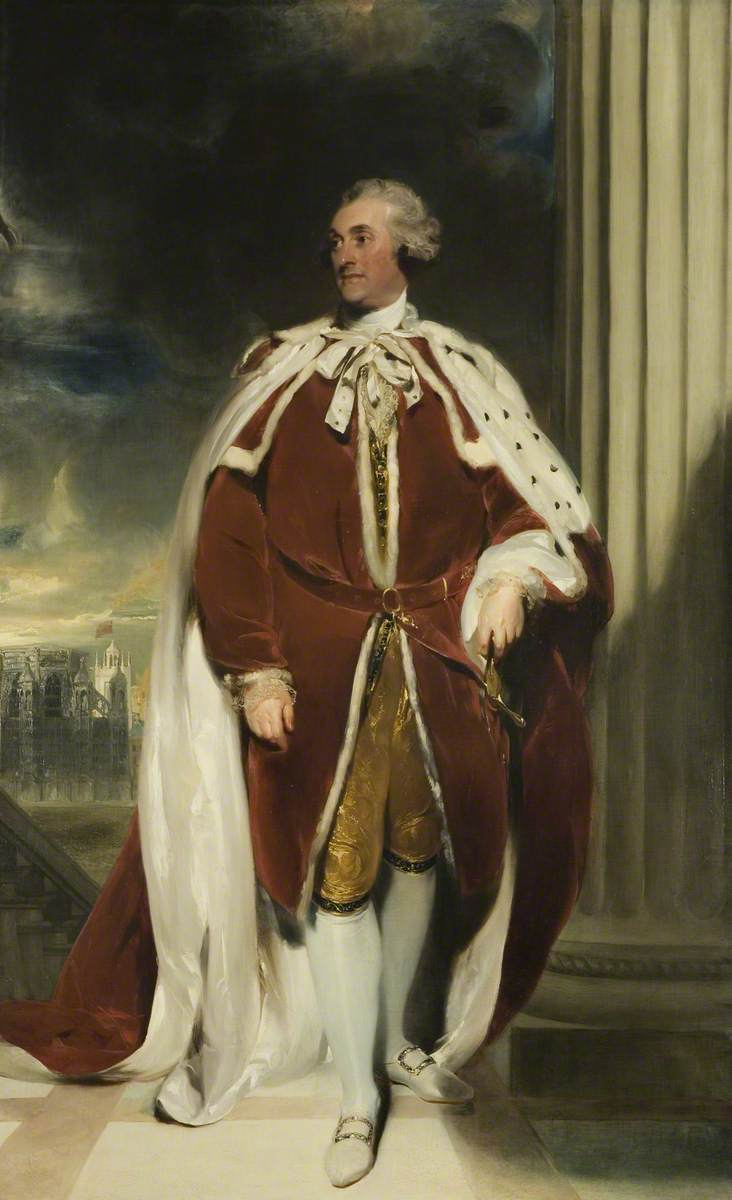
- Artist: Thomas Lawrence
- Year: 1792
- Type: Oil on canvas, portrait
- Dimensions: 238.8 cm × 139.8 cm (94.0 in × 55.0 in)
- Location: Bristol City Museum and Art Gallery, Bristol

Portrait of the Duke of Portland is an oil on canvas portrait painting by the English artist Thomas Lawrence, from 1792. It depicts the British politician William Cavendish-Bentinck, 3rd Duke of Portland, who served twice as Prime Minister of the United Kingdom.

== History and description ==
Titular head of the Fox-North Coalition for eight months from April to December 1783. The leader of the Portland Whigs he crossed to join the government of William Pitt the Younger (who had succeeded him as Prime Minister) in the wake of the French Revolution. In 1807 he returned to the premiership and held the position to 1809, shortly before his death.

The Bristol-born Lawrence had lived and worked in nearby Bath before moving to London where he rapidly established himself as a rising portraitist of high society. He was around twenty three years old when he depicted Portland in this full-length portrait wearing the robes of a peer of the realm. The painting was commissioned by the City of Bristol for a hundred guineas. Portland had served as Lord High Steward of Bristol and the work was displayed in the Mansion House in Queen Square to celebrate this connection.

The painting was narrowly saved from destruction during the 1831 Bristol riots, following the defeat of the second Reform Bill. The Mansion House was attacked by a mob and burned down although some of the contents were rescued in time. Today it is on display in the Bristol Museum in Clifton.

== Bibliography ==
- Holmes, Richard. Thomas Lawrence Portraits. National Portrait Gallery, 2010.
- Levey, Michael. Sir Thomas Lawrence. ISBN 0300109989. Yale University Press, 2005.
- Stockley, Andrew. Britain and France at the Birth of America: The European Powers and the Peace Negotiations of 1782–1783. ISBN 0859896153. University of Exeter Press, 2001.
- Wilkinson, David. The Duke of Portland: Politics and Party in the Age of George III. ISBN 0333963857. Springer, 2002.
