= Henry Somerset, 10th Duke of Beaufort =

British peer (1900–1984)

His Grace The Duke of Beaufort KG GCVO PC
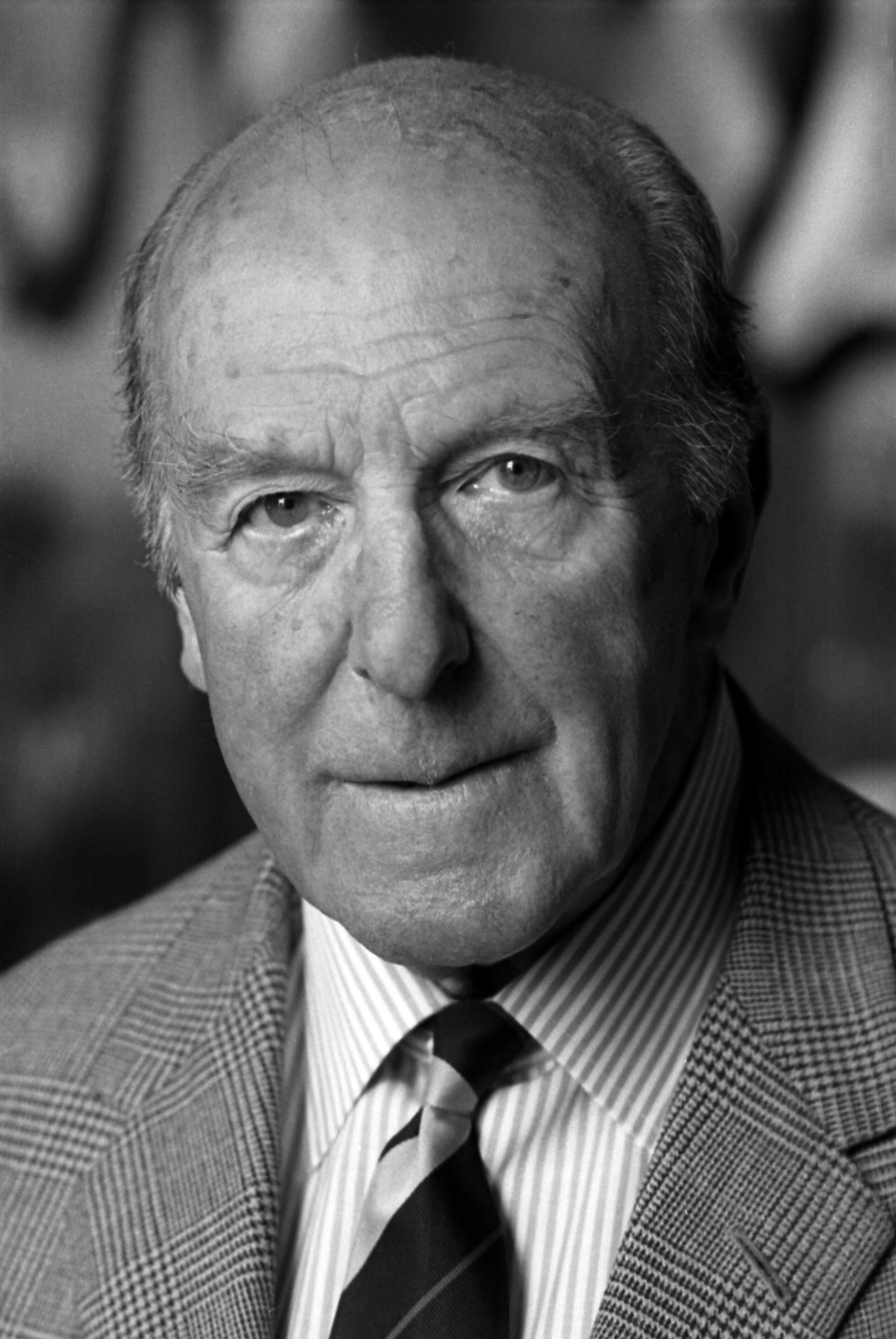
- The Duke of Beaufort by Allan Warren

Master of the Horse
- In office February 1936 – 1978
- Monarchs: Edward VIII; George VI; Elizabeth II
- Preceded by: Bernard Forbes, 8th Earl of Granard
- Succeeded by: David Fane, 15th Earl of Westmorland

4th Chancellor of the University of Bristol
- In office 1965–1970
- President: J. E. Harris; Arthur Roderick Collar; Sir Alec Merrison
- Preceded by: Sir Winston Churchill
- Succeeded by: Dorothy Hodgkin

Personal details
- Born: 4 April 1900
- Died: 5 February 1984 (aged 83) Badminton House, Gloucestershire, England
- Spouse: Lady Mary Cambridge (m. 1923)
- Parent(s): Henry Somerset, 9th Duke of Beaufort; Louise Harford

Henry Hugh Arthur FitzRoy Somerset, 10th Duke of Beaufort (4 April 1900 – 5 February 1984), styled Marquess of Worcester until 1924, was a peer, landowner, society figure and a great authority in the fields of horse racing and fox-hunting. He held the office of Master of the Horse for more than forty years (1936–1978), the longest to hold the position. He founded the Badminton Horse Trials and was deemed "the greatest fox-hunter of the twentieth century"; his long tenure as Master of the Beaufort Hunt led to his being universally nicknamed Master and his car bore the private numberplate MFH1. In 1980, he published the authoritative book Fox-Hunting.

== Origins ==
He was the youngest child and only son and heir of Henry Somerset, 9th Duke of Beaufort (1847–1924) by his wife Louise Emily Harford (1864–1945), a daughter of William Henry Harford, JP, DL, of Oldtown, Tockington, Gloucestershire, and widow of Charles Frederic van Tuyll van Serooskerken (1859–1893), a Dutch baron, by whom she had two sons.

=== Early origins ===
He was descended in the male line from Charles Somerset, 1st Earl of Worcester, 1st Baron Herbert (c.1460–1526), KG, an illegitimate son of Henry Beaufort, 3rd Duke of Somerset (1436–1464), 3rd in descent from John of Gaunt, 1st Duke of Lancaster (3rd surviving son of King Edward III) by his mistress (and later wife) Katherine Swynford. Charles was given the surname "Somerset" and was created Baron Herbert in 1506 and Earl of Worcester in 1513. The present Dukes of Beaufort are thus the last-known surviving male-line descendants of King Henry II (1154–1189) of England, Count of Anjou, founder of the Plantagenet dynasty, of which King Richard III (1483–1485) was the last ruling member in the male line. The present king is descended from Henry II only through various female lines, all of them, however, legitimate. The surname Beaufort (properly de Beaufort, "from Beaufort") reflects the fact that Katherine Swynford gave birth to her illegitimate children by John of Gaunt at his French castle and manor of Beaufort ("beautiful stronghold") (from 1688 Montmorency-Beaufort) in Champagne, situated 100 miles east of Paris.

== Education ==
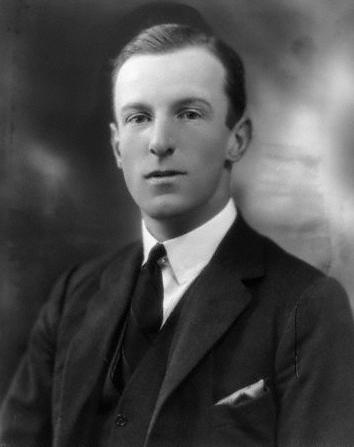
Somerset in 1923, aged 23, when before his father's death he was known by the courtesy title Marquess of Worcester

He was blooded at the age of 10. He was educated at Eton College and the Royal Military College, Sandhurst, from which he was commissioned into the Royal Horse Guards.

== Military service ==
Beaufort left the Army after a few years with the rank of lieutenant. He was Honorary Colonel of the 21st (Royal Gloucestershire Hussars) Armoured Car Company, Territorial Army between 1969 and 1971 and Honorary Colonel of the Royal Wessex Yeomanry between 1971 and 1984, and the Warwickshire Yeomanry between 1971 and 1972.

== Public appointments ==
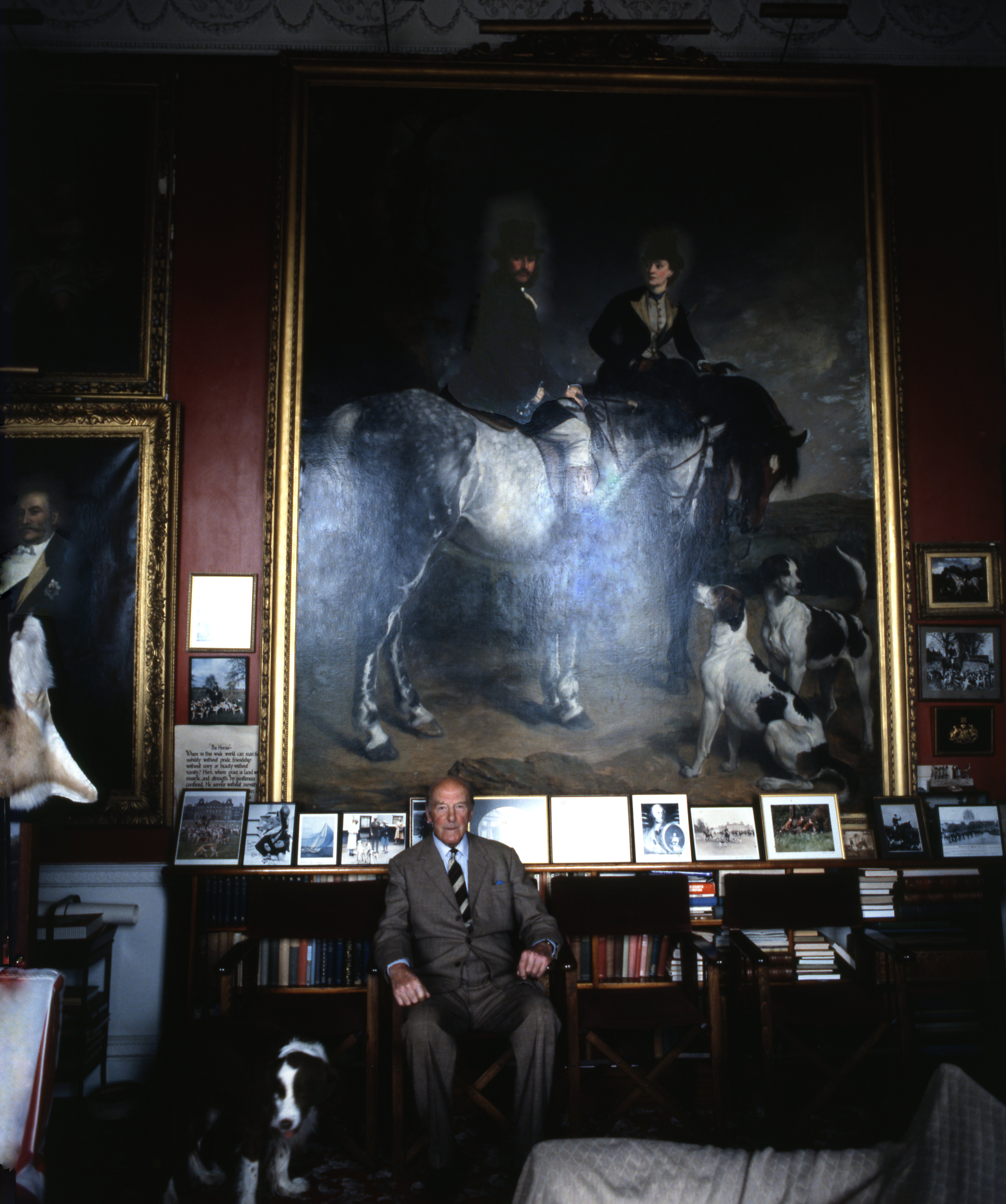
The 10th Duke at Badminton House, by Allan Warren

After the International Horse Show of 1933 was abandoned, a new committee headed by the young Beaufort succeeded in re-establishing the event at Olympia in 1934.

Beaufort was Master of the Horse (1936–1978) to three British sovereigns, Edward VIII, George VI and Elizabeth II. As such, he took part in royal functions, such as the 1947 wedding of Princess Elizabeth and Philip, Duke of Edinburgh.

He was appointed a Knight Grand Cross of the Royal Victorian Order (GCVO) in 1930, a Privy Counsellor in 1936, and a Knight Companion of the Order of the Garter in 1937; he was further awarded the decoration of the Royal Victorian Chain in 1953. In 1955, Francisco Craveiro Lopes, President of the Portuguese Republic, awarded him the Grand Cross of the Order of Christ.

He was Steward of Tewkesbury between 1948 and 1984, Hereditary Keeper of Raglan Castle (an office created by his ancestor William ap Thomas, the Blue Knight of Gwent), Lord Lieutenant of Bristol from 1931 to 1974 and Lord High Steward of Bristol, Tewkesbury and Gloucestershire. He also held the office of Lord Lieutenant of Gloucestershire between 1931 and 1984 and was Chancellor of the University of Bristol from 1965 to 1970.

Other offices held included President of the MCC, Bristol Rovers F.C., the British Olympic Association, the Battersea Dogs Home, and the Anchor Society in Bristol in 1969.

== Published works ==
He authored the following works:

- Fox-Hunting, published in 1980, an authoritative and comprehensive work on that subject with chapters titled: How my fox-hunting life began; The fox; The foxhound; Kennels; Hound management; Hound shows; The running of a pack of hounds; The general organisation of the hunt; The huntsman; The whipper-in; In the field; Riding to hounds; Fox coverts and their care (with thoughts on wire); Earth stopping; Terriers; Digging; Horses and stables in general; A defence of fox-hunting; First-aid for horse and rider; Etiquette and clothes.
- Memoirs, which he wrote in 1981, discussing his family history, the story of Badminton House, his royal duties, and the development of fox-hunting. At one point he bluntly declares that "obviously, the hunting of the fox has been my chief concern".

== Marriage ==
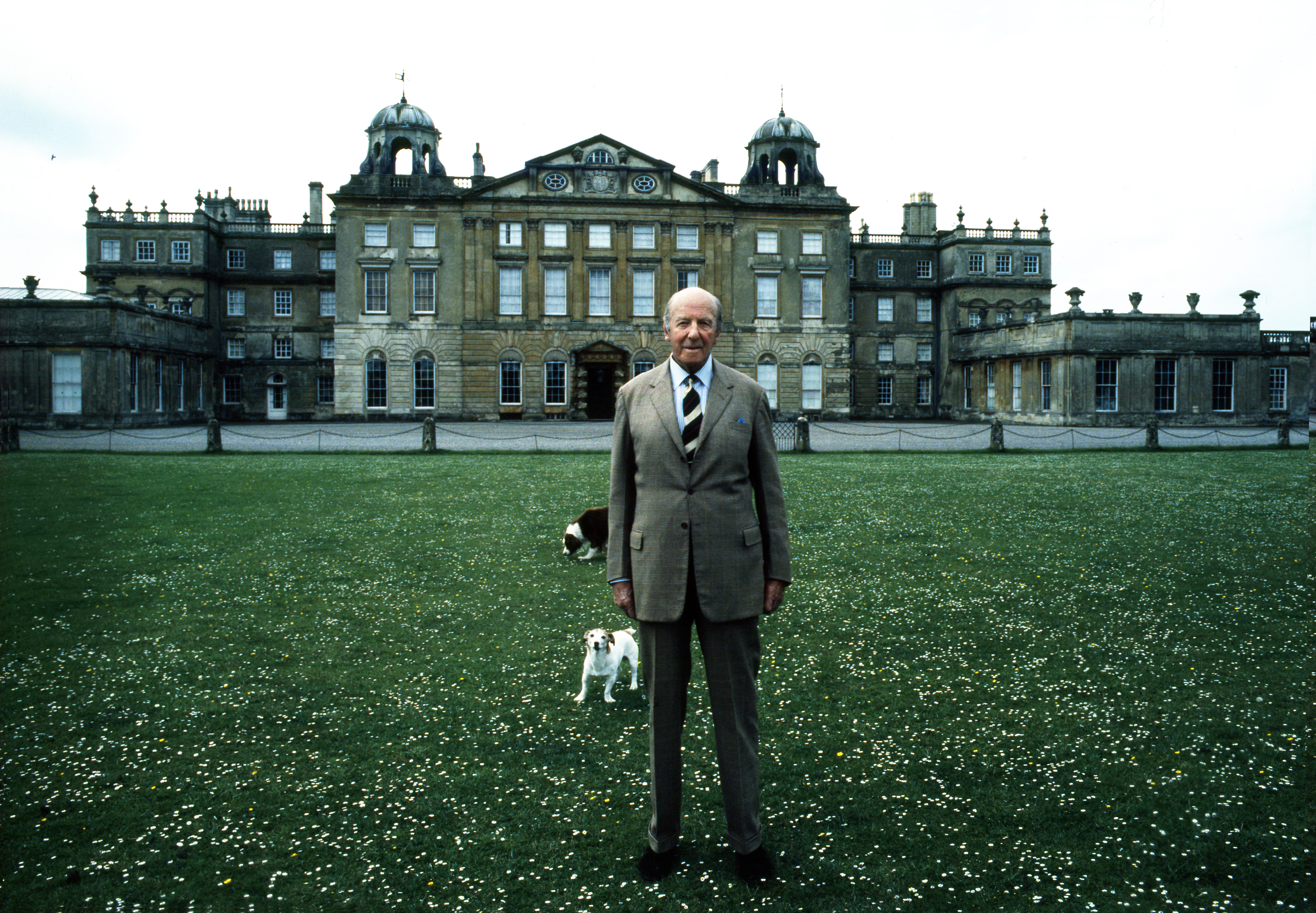
The 10th Duke of Beaufort at Badminton House

On 14 June 1923, Somerset, then styled Marquess of Worcester, married Lady Victoria Constance Mary Cambridge (1897–1987), a daughter of Adolphus Cambridge, 1st Marquess of Cambridge, a German prince whose mother was a granddaughter of King George III of the United Kingdom. The marriage was childless. Victoria had been born with the title Princess Mary of Teck; however, on 17 July 1917, following World War I, King George V decided to outwardly renounce his German heritage and issued a royal proclamation that changed the name of the British royal house from the German-sounding House of Saxe-Coburg and Gotha to the House of Windsor. All the king's British-domiciled German relatives likewise relinquished their German titles and styles, and were granted new British titles. Mary's father was created Marquess of Cambridge, and she became known as Lady Mary Cambridge until her marriage.

Mary's paternal aunt was Queen Mary, wife of George V, so that among her first cousins were King Edward VIII and King George VI. The Dukes of Beaufort were among the closest friends of the royal family. Queen Mary lived at Badminton during World War II and the royals stayed there several times a year, particularly for the Badminton Horse Trials, which usually took place at the time of Queen Mary's birthday.

== Character ==
A biographer described the Duke as:

"Tough as nails. His routine involved getting up at seven o'clock and riding round the estate before breakfast to see what was going on. He knew the 120 men who worked on his estate far better than any factory boss knows his staff. No decision concerning the estate was taken without the Duke's active authority. He answered all his own letters...until he retired to the rear of the pack in 1966, the sight of the Duke of Beaufort at the head of the hunt was one of the greatest spectacles to be seen in England".

Among the Duke's myriad personal friends was David Niven; during World War II he hosted Eleanor Roosevelt and Haile Selassie at Badminton. James Lees-Milne, the conservationist, rented a house next door and records their poor relationship in his celebrated diaries—he thought the Duke was "feudal". He was "a legendary womaniser" who conducted affairs with, among others, Lavinia, Duchess of Norfolk and Sally, Duchess of Westminster, a cousin of his wife.

== Death and burial ==
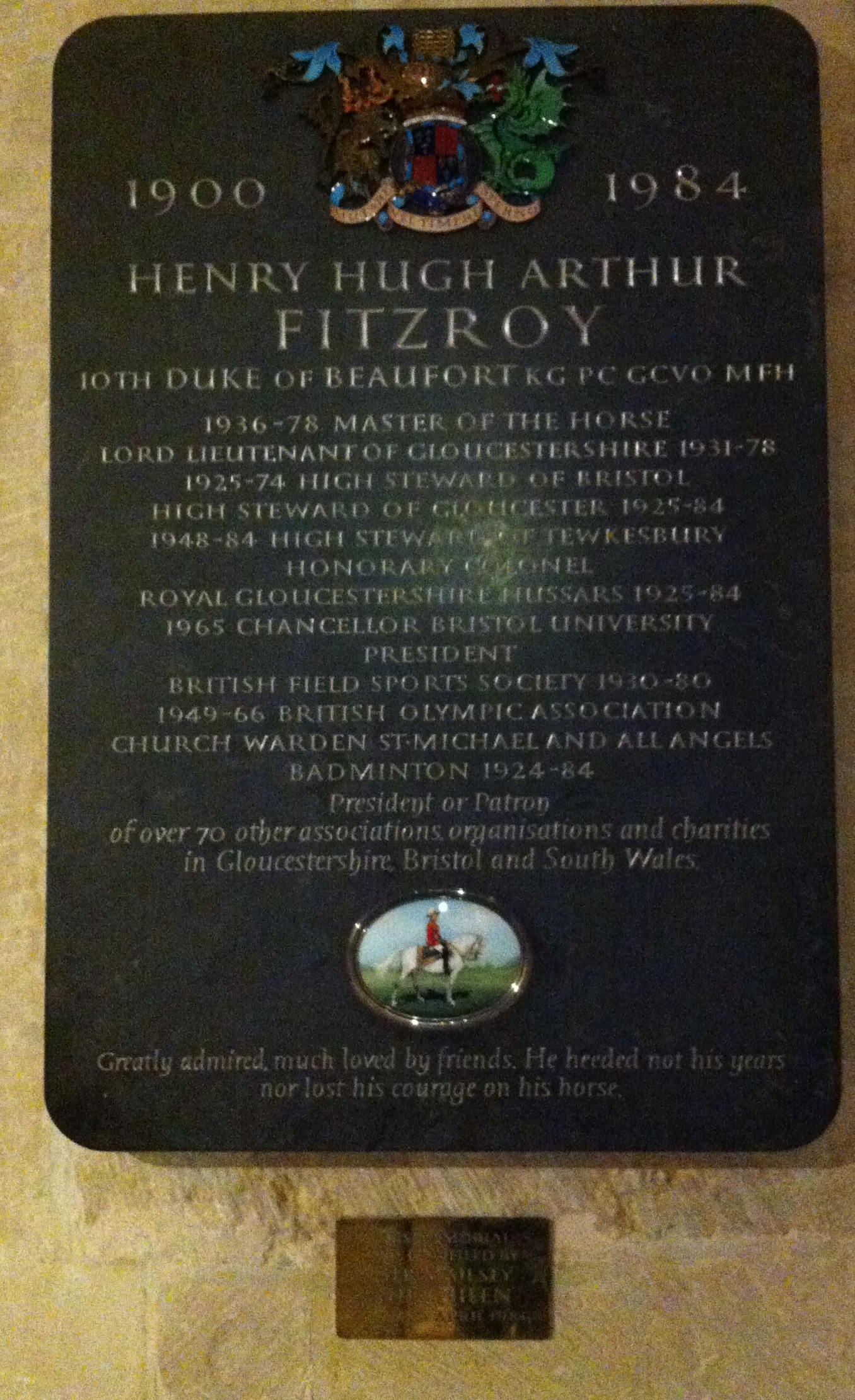
Monument to Henry Somerset, 10th Duke of Beaufort, Gloucester Cathedral

Beaufort died in 1984, aged 83, at his seat of Badminton House, and was buried in the churchyard of his parish Church of St Michael and All Angels, Badminton. Unusually, the Queen, who usually attends funerals of close family only, went to his, as did most other members of the royal family. On Boxing Day 1984 animal-rights activists vandalised his grave but stopped short of their plan to disinter his remains and send his head to Princess Anne.

== Succession ==
=== Dukedom of Beaufort ===
The Dukedom of Beaufort, created in 1682 by letters patent not by writ, cannot pass via a female line. As he died childless, the dukedom, the titles Earl of Worcester (cr. 1513), Marquess of Worcester (cr. 1642) and his estates passed to his first cousin twice removed, David Somerset, 11th Duke of Beaufort (1928–2017) (the grandson of his first cousin Henry Charles Somers Augustus Somerset, son of Lord Henry Somerset, second son of the 8th Duke), to whom he was close and who had lived for many years on the Badminton estate which he had helped to manage.

=== Baronies ===
The ancient titles of Baron de Botetourt (cr. 1305) and Baron Herbert (cr. 1461), created by writ, are able to pass via a female line and thus on the Duke's death they fell into abeyance between various descendants of his elder sister Lady Blanche Somerset (1897–1968), the wife, firstly, of John Eliot, 6th Earl of St Germans. Lady Blanche's two daughters were:

- Lady Rosemary Eliot (1919–1963), who married, firstly, Capt. Edward Nutting, Royal Horseguards, 2nd son of Sir Harold Stansmore Nutting, 2nd Baronet, by whom she had a daughter. She married, thirdly, Col. Ralph Rubens (d.1995), Sherwood Foresters, by whom she had a further daughter.
  - Davina Nutting (1940–1976), who married John Martin Brentnall Cope and had issue:
    - Jonathan Edric Cope (1961–1976)
    - Frederica Samantha Mary Cope (born 1963), 1/4 share of Barony of Bottetourt (in 2015), wife of David Thomas
      - Davinia Mary Mauritius Thomas (born 1999)
  - Alexandra Rubens (born 1951) 1/4 share of Barony of Bottetourt (in 2015), wife of Danny Peyronel.
    - Jesse Alexander Peyronel (born 1977)
- Lady Cathleen Eliot (1921–1994) (2nd daughter of Lady Blanche Somerset), who married, firstly, Capt. John Seyfried, Royal Horseguards, by whom she had a son:
  - David Seyfried-Herbert, 19th Baron Herbert (born 1952), 1/2 share of Barony of Bottetourt (in 2015), who in 2002 succeeded as 19th Baron Herbert on the termination of the abeyance.

Political offices
Preceded by The Earl of Granard	Master of the Horse; 1936–1978	Succeeded by The Earl of Westmorland
Academic offices
Preceded by Winston Churchill	Chancellor of the University of Bristol; 1965–1970	Succeeded by Dorothy Hodgkin
Court offices
Preceded by The Earl Beauchamp	Lord Lieutenant of Gloucestershire; 1931–1984	Succeeded by Martin Gibbs
Honorary titles
Preceded by Malcolm MacDonald	Senior Privy Counsellor; 1981–1984	Succeeded by The Lord Balfour of Inchrye
Peerage of England
Preceded by Henry Somerset	Duke of Beaufort; 1924–1984	Succeeded by David Somerset
Preceded by Henry Somerset	Marquess of Worcester; 1924–1984	Succeeded by David Somerset
Preceded by Henry Somerset	Earl of Worcester; 1924–1984	Succeeded by David Somerset
Preceded by Henry Somerset	Baron Botetourt; 1924–1984	In abeyance
Preceded by Henry Somerset	Baron Herbert; 1924–1984	In abeyance Title next held by David Seyfried-Herbert as baron from 2002
