= James Whatman Bosanquet =

English banker and writer on biblical chronology (1804–1877)

James Whatman Bosanquet (1804–1877) was an English banker and writer on biblical chronology.

== Life ==
He was son of the banker Samuel Bosanquet III of Forest House, Essex, and Dingestow Court, Monmouthshire, (1768–1843) and his wife Laetitia Philippa Whatman, daughter of James Whatman of Kent, and was born 10 January 1804; Samuel Richard Bosanquet was his elder brother. He was educated at Westminster School, and at the age of 18 entered Bosanquet, Salt, & Co., the family bank. In due course he became a partner. He lived at Claysmore in Middlesex.

A contributor to the Transactions of the Society of Biblical Archæology, Bosanquet subsidised its publication; and he also supported other works on Assyriology. He died 22 December 1877.

== Works ==
Bosanquet was known as a writer on biblical and Assyrian chronology:

- Chronology of the Times of Daniel, Ezra, and Nehemiah (1848);
- Fall of Nineveh and the Siege of Sennacherib, chronologically considered (1853);
- Messiah the Prince, or the Inspiration of the Prophecies of Daniel (1856, 2nd edition 1869);
- Hebrew Chronology from Solomon to Christ (1867);
- Chronological Remarks on Assurbanipal (1871); and
- On the Date of Lachish (1878).

His earliest publications, related to finance, were Metallic, Paper, and Credit Currency, 1842, and a Letter to the Right Hon. G. Cornewall Lewis on the Bank Charter Act of 1844, 1857.

== Family ==
Bosanquet married three times:

1. To Merelina, daughter of Sir Nicholas Conyngham Tindal (five sons, three daughters);
2. To Frances Georgiana Elizabeth (c.1817–1862), daughter of Lord John Thomas Henry Somerset (no children); and
3. To Emily Dorothy Best (three daughters).

Bernard Bosanquet the cricketer was a grandson.

== Notes ==
Attribution

This article incorporates text from a publication now in the public domain: Stephen, Leslie, ed. (1886). "Bosanquet, James Whatman". Dictionary of National Biography. Vol. 5. London: Smith, Elder & Co.
