= Bernard Holloway =

English cricketer

Bernard Henry Holloway (13 January 1888 – 27 September 1915) was an English cricketer active from 1910 to 1914 who played for Sussex. He was born in Wandsworth Common and died in Loos-en-Gohelle, France, during the First World War. He appeared in 19 first-class matches as a righthanded batsman who scored 701 runs with a highest score of 100.
