= Phillip Docker =

Australian cricketer

Personal information
- Born: 8 April 1886; Sydney, New South Wales, Australia
- Died: 29 October 1978 (aged 92); Sydney, New South Wales, Australia
- Source: ESPNcricinfo, 26 December 2016

Phillip Docker (8 April 1886 – 29 October 1978) was an Australian cricketer. He played two first-class matches for New South Wales in 1910/11.

== See also ==
- List of New South Wales representative cricketers
