= Claude Burton =

English cricketer

Robert Claude Burton (11 April 1891 – 30 April 1971) was an English first-class cricketer, who played for Oxford University and Yorkshire.

Burton was born in Bridlington, East Riding of Yorkshire, England, the younger brother of Cecil Burton, who captained Yorkshire at cricket after World War I. Burton was educated at Malvern College and Brasenose College, Oxford, and appeared in several matches for Oxford University from 1911 to 1914, without ever becoming a regular player. In the 1914 season, he made two appearances for Yorkshire, scoring 47 in his first match against Somerset, and taking useful wickets in the second against Gloucestershire. After the war, Burton played only two more first-class matches: once for the Demobilised Officers' side against a combined Army and Navy team at Lord's in 1919, and then, in 1928, for the amateur Harlequins team that played the 1928 West Indies tourists at Eastbourne.

Burton was a right-handed batsman who usually batted in the lower middle order, though in his final game he opened the innings. He also bowled right-arm medium-fast.

He became a house master, and was in charge of the cricket, at Eastbourne College, and died nearby at Stone Cross, near Pevensey, East Sussex, in April 1971, aged 80.
