= John Latimer =

British journalist and historian of Bristol (1824–1904)

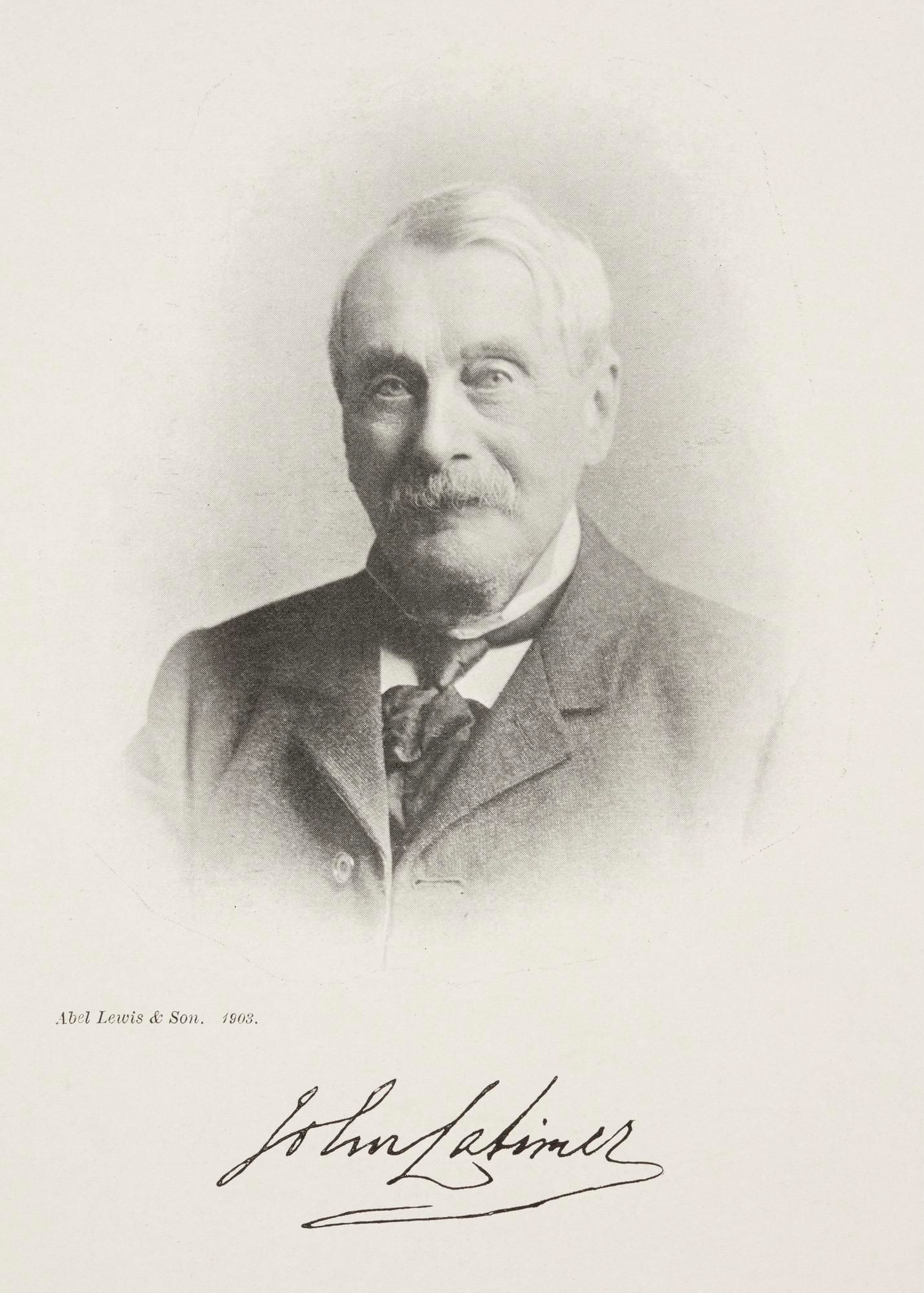
- John Latimer in a 1903 portrait by Abel Lewis & Son
- Born: 7 May 1824; Newcastle upon Tyne, England
- Died: 4 January 1904 (aged 79); Cotham, Bristol, England
- Occupations: Journalist, antiquarian, historian
- Employer: Bristol Mercury
- Known for: The Annals of Bristol

John Latimer (7 May 1824 – 4 January 1904) was a British journalist, antiquarian, and historian. Born in Newcastle upon Tyne, he spent the latter half of his life in Bristol, where he served as the editor of the Bristol Mercury for twenty-five years. He is known for his multi-volume Annals of Bristol, which chronicle the city's history from the seventeenth through the nineteenth centuries, and for his organisation of the city's ancient archives.

== Early life ==
Latimer was born on 7 May 1824 in Newcastle upon Tyne. He was interested in English and history during his schooling and, starting at the age of twelve, maintained a diary of current events, a habit that preceded his later career as an annalist.

He began his professional life as a freelance journalist in Newcastle. His earliest contribution to historical literature was a continuation of John Sykes's Local Records, a register of events in Newcastle and the surrounding district.

== Career ==
=== Journalism ===
In 1858, William Somerton appointed Latimer as the editor of the Bristol Mercury, a Liberal daily newspaper in the West of England. Upon moving to Bristol, he took an interest in the city's maritime character, particularly the ships sailing into the city centre near Queen Square.

Latimer served as editor until his retirement in 1883. During his tenure, the paper published a series of articles in 1883 by chief reporter James Crosby that investigated the extent of poverty in Victorian Bristol; this series has been described as the city's first instance of investigative reporting.

=== Historical work ===
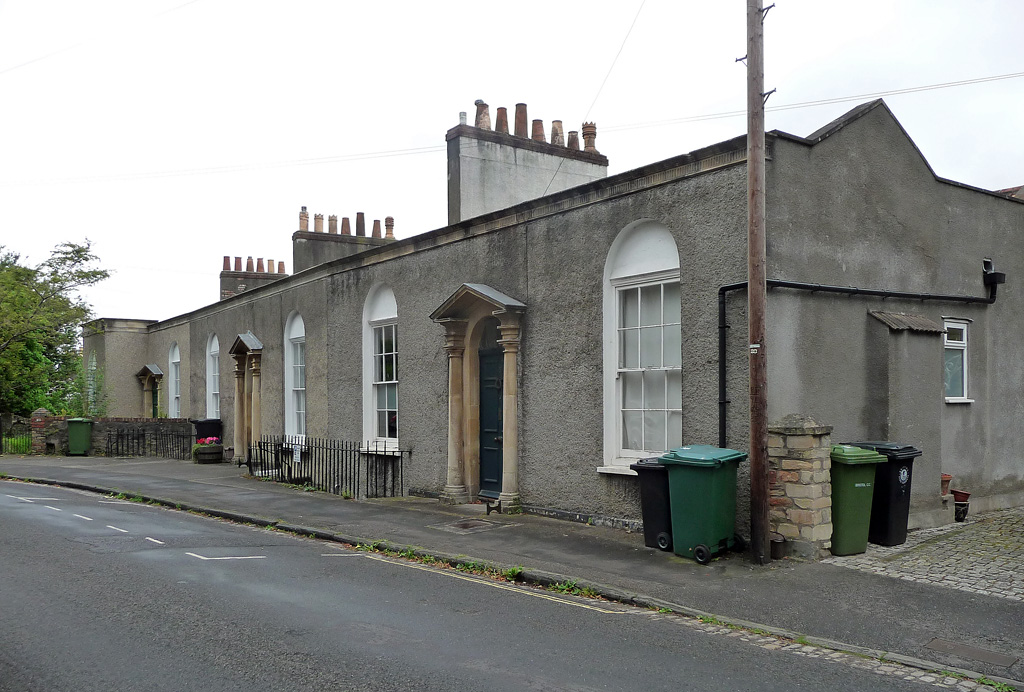
The houses at Trelawney Place, Cotham, where Latimer wrote the Annals

While Latimer wrote ephemeral historical sketches during his journalistic career, his major works were produced after he retired. Working from the library of his home at Trelawney Place in Cotham, and later Redland, he dedicated his retirement to compiling the history of his adopted city.

His primary work was the Annals of Bristol, published in three volumes. Latimer wrote these in reverse chronological order:

- The Annals of Bristol in the Nineteenth Century (1887): Written first as Latimer had witnessed many of the events personally. This volume took four years to complete.
- The Annals of Bristol in the Eighteenth Century (1893): This volume took six years to research and write.
- The Annals of Bristol in the Seventeenth Century (1900): This volume required seven years of research due to the scarcity of periodical sources from the era. Latimer relied on State Papers, Corporation archives, the British Museum, and Privy Council minutes.

A 1998 review noted that Latimer's writing style blended dry records with a "sardonic sense of humour," often delivering critical verdicts on city councillors and influential figures such as Isambard Kingdom Brunel. Latimer was also active in the local antiquarian community. He served as a vice president of the Clifton Antiquarian Club, joined the Bristol and Gloucestershire Archaeological Society on its foundation, and acted on its council. From 1894 to 1900 he was the Society's honorary secretary for Bristol.

=== Archival contributions ===
Beyond his writing, Latimer contributed to the organisation of Bristol's historical archives. In 1896, the Museum and Library committee reported that Latimer had arranged and cataloged a collection of ancient deeds presented by the Rev. Samuel Seyer. He also organized manuscripts relating to the poems of Thomas Chatterton, including original letters from the Rowley controversy, and arranged the Rev. H. J. Ellacombe’s collections on campanology.

In 1900, a committee of citizens, including the Lord Mayor of Bristol, presented Latimer with a testimonial and a purse of over 100 guineas at the Council House in recognition of his services. In his acceptance speech, Latimer described himself as "one of the finest specimens of the human species called 'dry-as-dust'."

== Personal life ==
Latimer remained a bachelor throughout his life. Contemporaries described him as an eligible partner, though he declined opportunities for marriage to focus on his work. Despite his position as a newspaper editor, he maintained a retiring disposition and avoided public notoriety.

He was known within his personal circle for his scholarship and for mentoring younger writers. He maintained close relationships with his sister, known as Miss Latimer, and Robert Welch, a fellow journalist and friend who predeceased him.

== Death ==
Latimer died on 4 January 1904 at his residence, 3 Trelawney Place, Cotham, at the age of 79. He had continued working until shortly before his death; he had recently completed the manuscript for the History of the Society of Merchant Venturers of the City of Bristol and was engaged in arranging the city's ancient charters at the request of the corporation.

His funeral was held on 6 January 1904. He was buried in the Unitarian burial ground at Brunswick Square, in a grave shared with his mother (who died in 1872) and Robert Welch.

== Legacy ==
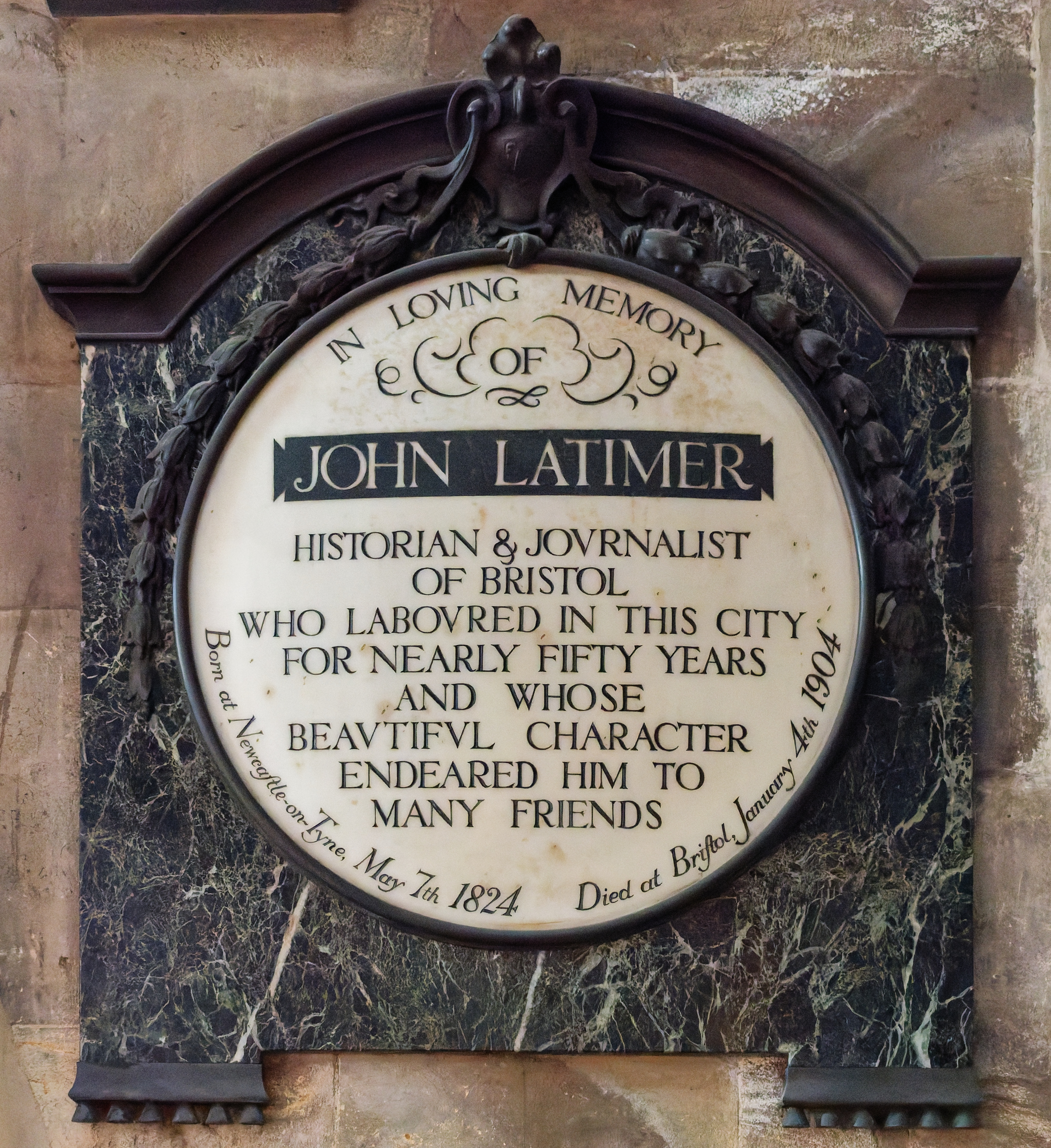
Latimer's memorial is located in the north transept of Bristol Cathedral.

Following his death, a committee of citizens commissioned a memorial tablet. On 14 January 1905, the tablet was unveiled in the north transept of Bristol Cathedral. Designed by H. Dare Bryan, the memorial consists of a slab of Vert des Alpes marble with a white statuary marble inscription panel, surrounded by bronze mountings in an eighteenth-century classic style.

By the mid-20th century, Latimer's grave in Brunswick Square had fallen into disrepair, with the headstone leaning significantly. It was subsequently restored and straightened by the Bristol and Gloucestershire Archaeological Society. In 1964, on the 60th anniversary of his death, a quill pen was placed in the inkpot of the cathedral memorial as a tribute, and an essay competition was launched to encourage local history study among students.

Obituaries described Latimer as Bristol's "chiefest historian" of the modern era, and he was later referred to as "the Bristol Froissart". His Annals became sought after by collectors; by 1920, a set was sold at auction for £10, a record price for modern Bristol books at the time. His works were reprinted in the 1970s and remain standard references for the history of Bristol.

== Selected works ==
- Latimer, John (1887). The Annals of Bristol in the Nineteenth Century. W. & F. Morgan. OCLC 558028236.
- Latimer, John (1893). The Annals of Bristol in the Eighteenth Century. Printed for the author (Butler & Tanner). OCLC 2996647.
- Latimer, John (1900). The Annals of Bristol in the Seventeenth Century. William George's Sons. OCLC 2996673.
- Latimer, John (1903). The History of the Society of Merchant Venturers of the City of Bristol: With Some Account of the Anterior Merchants' Guilds. J. W. Arrowsmith. OCLC 468838865.
- Latimer, John (1908). Sixteenth-Century Bristol (originally published as The Corporation of Bristol in the Olden Time). J. W. Arrowsmith (Bristol); Simpkin, Marshall, Hamilton, Kent & Co. (London).
