= Henry Somerset, 5th Duke of Beaufort =

English courtier and politician (1744–1803)

His Grace The Duke of Beaufort KG
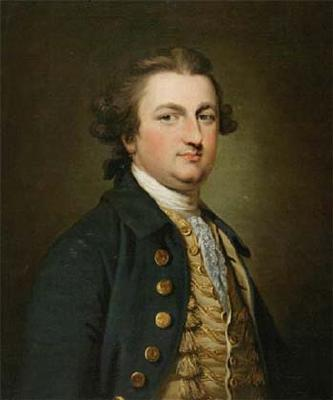
- Portrait of Beaufort by Francis Cotes

Master of the Horse to Queen Charlotte
- In office 1768–1770
- Preceded by: The Earl De La Warr
- Succeeded by: The Earl Waldegrave

Personal details
- Born: 16 October 1744 Hanover Square, Westminster
- Died: 11 October 1803 Badminton House, Gloucestershire
- Spouse: Elizabeth Boscawen (m. 1766)
- Children: 13, including: Henry Somerset, 6th Duke of Beaufort; Lord Charles Somerset; Lord Robert Somerset; Lord Arthur Somerset; FitzRoy Somerset, 1st Baron Raglan
- Parent(s): Charles Somerset, 4th Duke of Beaufort; Elizabeth Berkeley
- Education: Oriel College, Oxford

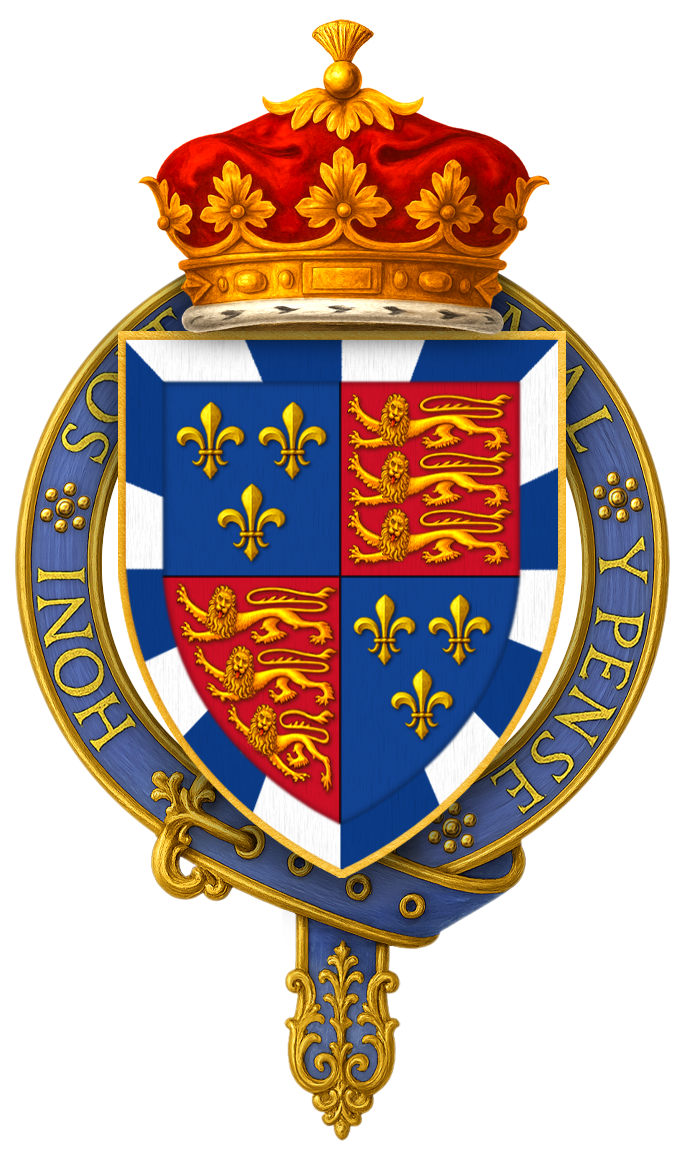
Coat of arms of Henry Somerset, 5th Duke of Beaufort, KG

Henry Somerset, 5th Duke of Beaufort (16 October 1744 – 11 October 1803) was an English courtier and politician. He was styled the Marquess of Worcester from 1745 until 1756, when he succeeded his father as 5th Duke of Beaufort, 7th Marquess of Worcester, 11th Earl of Worcester, and 13th Baron Herbert.

== Early life ==
Somerset was born on 16 October 1744 at Brook Street, Hanover Square, London. He was the only son of Lord Charles Somerset (second son of the 2nd Duke of Beaufort) and Elizabeth Beaufort, daughter of John Symes Berkeley.

At the time of Somerset's birth, his father sat in the House of Commons. He was five months old when his father succeeded his elder brother 3rd Duke of Beaufort in the dukedom, at which point Somerset was styled by his father's subsidiary title, the Marquess of Worcester. The 3rd Duke left only an illegitimate daughter, Margaret Burr, who married the artist Thomas Gainsborough.

In October 1765, shortly after his 21st birthday, he succeeded his father as the 5th Duke of Beaufort. On 18 October 1760, Beaufort began his studies at Oriel College, Oxford, graduating on 7 July 1763 with a Doctor of Civil Laws (DCL) degree.

== Career ==
Beaufort held the office of Grand Master of the Premier Grand Lodge of England between 1767 and 1772. This would put him in the middle of the conflict that arose in England between the Premier Grand Lodge of England and the Antient Grand Lodge of England.

From 1768 to 1770, he was Master of the Horse to Queen Charlotte. He was appointed Lord-Lieutenant of Monmouthshire in 1771 and Lord-Lieutenant of Brecknockshire in 1787, holding both offices until his death in 1803, as well as that of Lord-Lieutenant of Leicestershire from 1787 to 1799. He was appointed Colonel of the Monmouthshire Militia on 23 December 1771 and assumed command of the Monmouth and Brecon Militia when the combined regiment was embodied on 1 February 1793. He remained in command until his death. He was invested as a Knight of the Order of the Garter (KG) on 2 June 1786. On 4 June 1803, shortly before his death, he succeeded to the title of 5th Baron Botetourt.

== Personal life ==
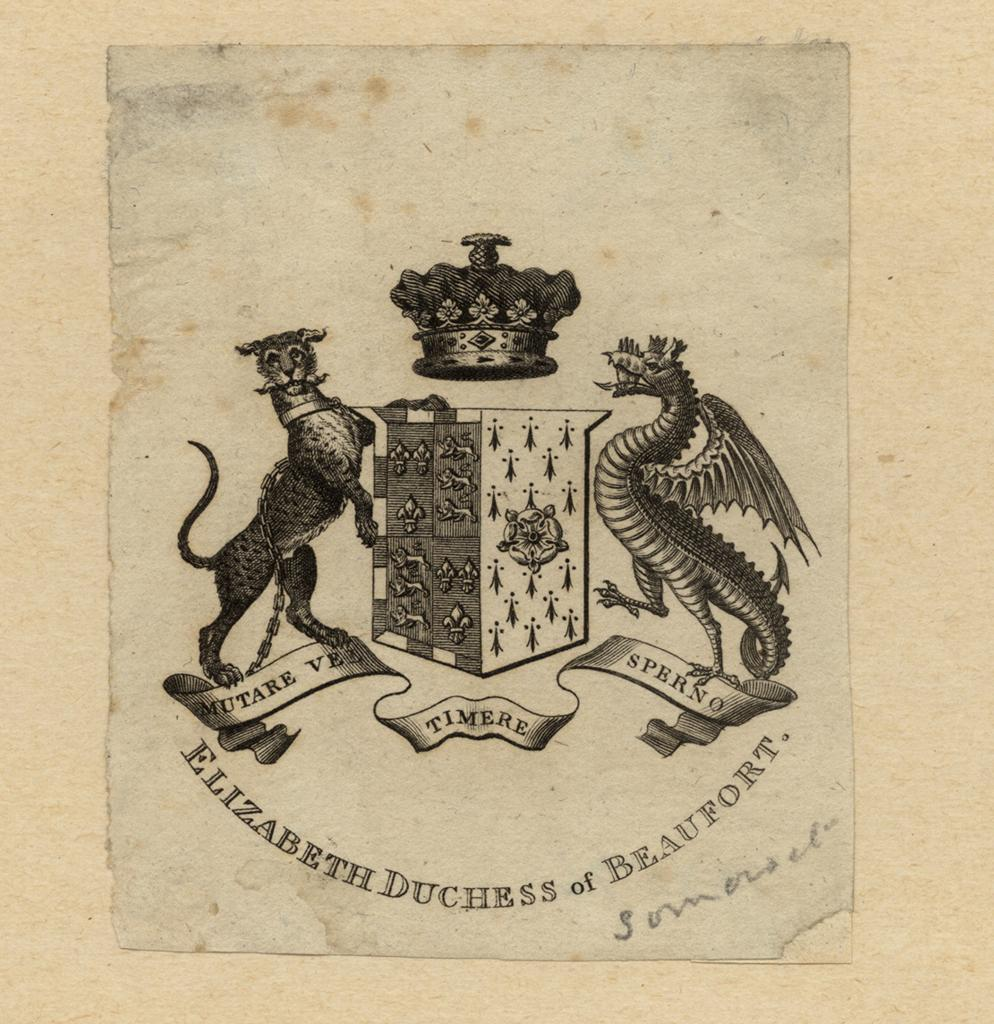
Bookplate of the Duchess of Beaufort

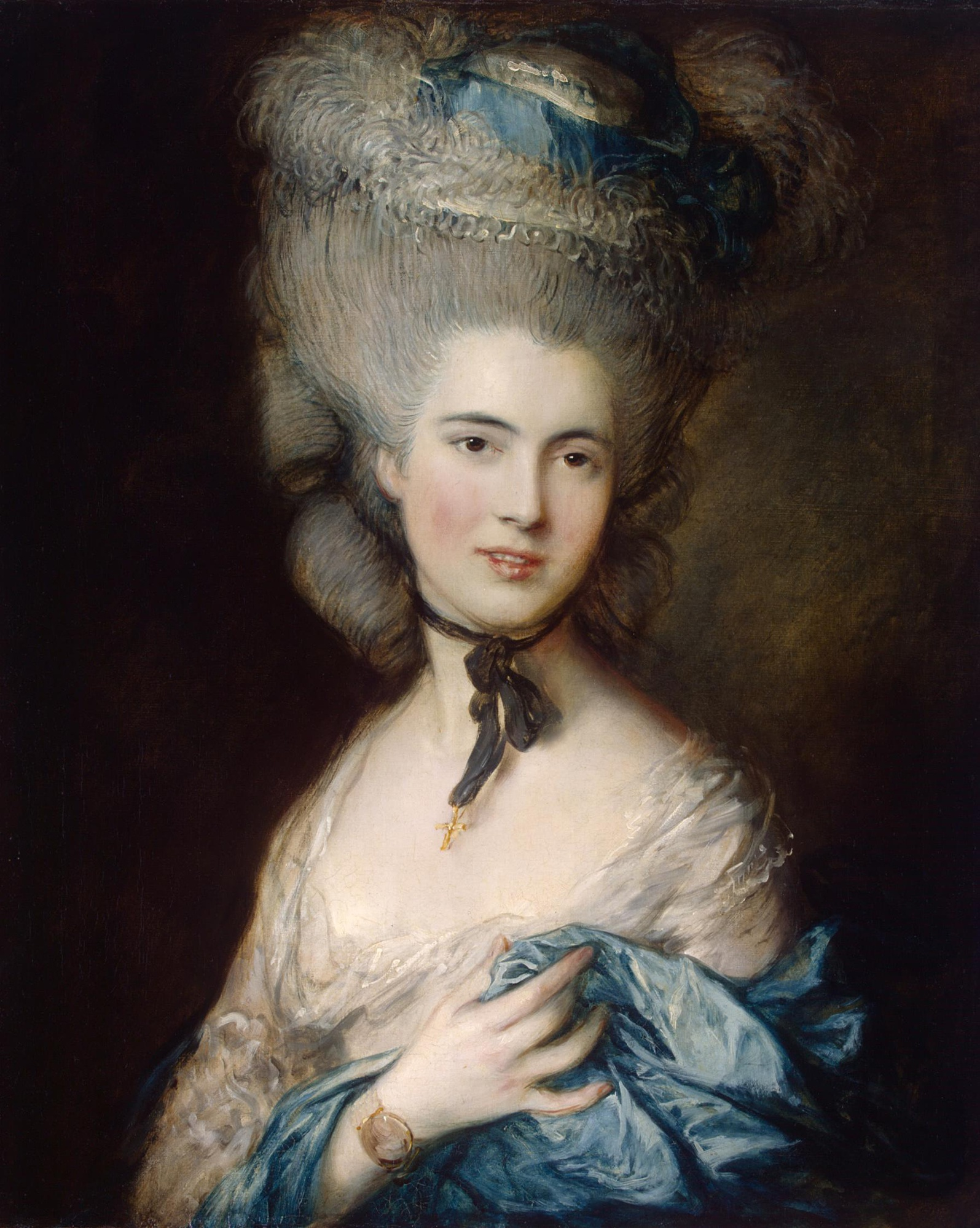
Elizabeth, Duchess of Beaufort by Gainsborough. c. 1770s - early 1780s

On 2 January 1766, he married Elizabeth Boscawen, daughter of Hon. Edward Boscawen, Admiral of the Blue, and sister to George Boscawen, 3rd Viscount Falmouth. Elizabeth died 15 June 1828. Together they had four daughters and nine sons:

1. Henry Charles Somerset, 6th Duke of Beaufort (1766–1835), who married Lady Charlotte Leveson-Gower, a daughter of Granville Leveson-Gower, 1st Marquess of Stafford and Lady Susanna Stewart (a daughter of the 6th Earl of Galloway), in 1791.
2. Lord Charles Henry Somerset (1767–1831), who married Hon. Elizabeth Courtenay, daughter of William Courtenay, 2nd Viscount Courtenay, in 1788. After her death in 1815, he married Lady Mary Poulett, daughter of John Poulett, 4th Earl Poulett, in 1821.
3. Lord Edward Somerset (1768–1769), who died young.
4. Lord Norborne Berkeley Henry Somerset (Note: Lord Norborne was likely physically or/and intellectually disabled, as there is no public record of his life except birth and (delayed) death announcements. He died at age 67 at Wick House, near Sherston, Wiltshire, close to the family seat of Badminton.) (4 May 1771 – 19 October 1838)
5. Lady Elizabeth Somerset (1773–1836), who married Very Rev Charles Talbot, Dean of Salisbury, son of Rev. Hon. George Talbot (a son of the 1st Baron Talbot) and Hon. Anne Bouverie (a daughter of the 1st Viscount Folkestone), in 1796.
6. Lady Frances Elizabeth Somerset (1774–1841)
7. Lady Harriet Isabella Elizabeth Somerset (1775–1855), who married Col. Hugh Henry Mitchell, a son of Hugh Henry Mitchell, MP for Ballyshannon and Enniskillen, in 1804.
8. Gen. Lord Robert Edward Henry Somerset (1776–1842), who married Hon. Louisa Augusta Courtenay, daughter of William Courtenay, 2nd Viscount Courtenay, in 1805.
9. Lord Arthur John Henry Somerset (1780–1816), who married Hon. Elizabeth Boscawen, daughter of George Boscawen, 3rd Viscount Falmouth, in 1808.
10. Rev. Lord William Somerset (1784–1861), who married Elizabeth Molyneux, daughter of Lt.-Gen. Sir Thomas Molyneux, 5th Baronet, in 1813. After her death in 1843, the following year he married Frances Westby Brady, daughter of Henry Brady of Raheen Manor, County Clare, and widow of Cornelius O'Callaghan of Ballynahinch (died 1829).
11. Lady Anne Elizabeth Somerset (1786–1803), who died unmarried.
12. Col. Lord John Thomas Henry Somerset (1787–1846), who married Lady Catherine Annesley, daughter of Arthur Annesley, 1st Earl of Mountnorris and Hon. Sarah Cavendish (a daughter of Sir Henry Cavendish, 2nd Baronet and the 1st Baroness Waterpark), in 1814.
13. FitzRoy James Henry Somerset, 1st Baron Raglan (1788–1855), who married Lady Emily Wellesley-Pole, daughter of William Wellesley-Pole, 3rd Earl of Mornington, in 1814.

Lord Beaufort died on 11 October 1803 and was buried at St Michael and All Angels Church, Badminton. His last will was dated from 21 June 1789 to 11 September 1800. He was succeeded in his titles by his eldest son, Henry

=== Relation to Richard III ===
Beaufort and Richard III were both male-line descendants of the Plantagenet King Edward III: Beaufort through Edward's fourth son, John of Gaunt, and Richard through Edward's fifth son, Edmund of Langley. After the exhumation of Richard III in 2012, intensive research was conducted using the DNA of descendants of the immediate relatives of Richard, who died without issue. The body exhumed was positively identified by matching his mitochondrial DNA with two living descendants of his eldest sister, Anne of York).

All five known living male-line relatives of Richard are descended from the 5th Duke of Beaufort; however, a Y chromosome type of Richard failed to match any of the five, indicating that at least one non-paternity event had occurred somewhere in the 19 generations between Richard and the 5th Duke. Four of the five, however, had DNA indicating they held Plantagenet ancestry through different ancestors. The fifth was not related at all, indicating an additional non-paternity event had occurred in the 5th Duke's male line in recent generations.

== Notes ==
Honorary titles
Preceded by Thomas Morgan	Lord Lieutenant of Monmouthshire; 1771–1799	Succeeded by The Duke of Beaufort
Preceded by Charles Morgan	Lord Lieutenant of Brecknockshire; 1787–1803	Succeeded by The Duke of Beaufort
Preceded by The Duke of Rutland	Lord Lieutenant of Leicestershire; 1787–1799	Succeeded by The Duke of Rutland
Court offices
Preceded by The Earl De La Warr	Master of the Horse to Queen Charlotte; 1768–1770	Succeeded by The Earl Waldegrave
Masonic offices
Preceded by The Lord Blayney	Grand Master of the Premier Grand Lodge of England; 1767–1772	Succeeded by The Lord Petre
Peerage of England
Preceded by Charles Noel Somerset	Duke of Beaufort; 1756–1803	Succeeded by Henry Charles Somerset
In abeyance Title last held by Norborne Berkeley	Baron Botetourt; 1803	Succeeded by Henry Charles Somerset
