= Cecil Burton =

English cricketer

David Cecil Fowler Burton, better known as Cecil Burton, (13 September 1887 – 24 September 1971) was a first-class cricketer, who played for Cambridge University (1907–1908), Marylebone Cricket Club (MCC) (1910–1922) and Yorkshire (1907–1921). He captained Yorkshire from 1919 to 1921.

He was born in Bridlington, East Riding of Yorkshire, England. A right-handed batsman, Burton scored 3,057 runs in his 130 first-class matches, with a highest score of 142* against Hampshire. His other century, 110, came against Leicestershire. He averaged 20.24 with the bat, and took 54 catches in the field. His brother Claude Burton, cousin David S.G. Burton and uncle Arthur Trollope, all played first-class cricket.

Burton died at the age of 84 in September 1971, in Chertsey, Surrey.

== Sources ==
- Cricinfo profile
- Cricket Archive statistics
