= Lord William Somerset =

Rev. Lord William George Henry Somerset (2 September 1784 – 14 January 1851) was an Anglican cleric and aristocrat who was rector of the Woolaston Parish in the 1800s. He lived in an adjacent manor house now called The Old Rectory.

Lord William was the seventh of nine sons of Henry Somerset, 5th Duke of Beaufort and Elizabeth Boscawen, daughter of the Hon. Edward Boscawen. He also had four sisters.

He is buried in the St Andrews Church cemetery.

== Family ==
He married Elizabeth Molyneux (d. 1843), daughter of Sir Thomas Molyneux, 5th Baronet on 29 June 1813. They had five children:

- Col. Henry Charles Capel (20 Jun 1816-17 Jan 1905), married Alice Elizabeth O'Connell, daughter of Sir Maurice Charles O'Connell and granddaughter of Vice Adm. William Bligh. They had seven children.
- Rev. William (3 Oct 1822-29 May 1902), who married Georgiana Amelia Darling and together had four sons.
- FitzRoy Molyneux Henry (29 Dec 1823-22 Feb 1901), married firstly Jemima Drummond Nairne, and secondly Emily Biedermann. With the former they had at least two sons.
- John Plantagenet Edward Henry (1826-1838)
- Rev. Boscawen Thomas George Henry (2 Jun 1833-13 Jun 1893), who married Sophia Vernon Powys, daughter of Horatio Powys, Bishop of Sodor and Man. They had two sons.
