= Arthur Somerset Jr. =

English cricketer

Arthur Plantagenet Francis Cecil Somerset (28 September 1889 – 13 October 1957) was an English cricketer active from 1911 to 1919 who played for Sussex. He was born and died in Worthing. He appeared in 29 first-class matches as a righthanded batsman who bowled right-arm medium pace. He scored 438 runs with a highest score of 39 not out and took 33 wickets with a best performance of five for 62.
