= Somerset (surname) =

Somerset is a surname, and may refer to:

- Alfred Somerset (1829–1915), British Army officer and coach driver
- Anne Somerset (historian) (born 1955), English historian and writer
- Anne Somerset, Countess of Northumberland (1538–1596), English noblewoman
- Anne Seymour, Duchess of Somerset (1497–1587), wife of Lord Protector Somerset
- Lord Arthur John Henry Somerset (1780–1816), British politician
- Lord Arthur Somerset (1851–1926), British nobleman
- Arthur Somerset Sr. (1855–1937), English cricketer
- Arthur Somerset Jr. (1889–1957), English cricketer
- Lord Charles Somerset (1767–1831), British general and governor of Cape Colony
- Charles Somerset, 1st Earl of Worcester (1460–1526), English peer
- Charles Somerset, Marquess of Worcester (1660–1698), eldest son of Henry Somerset, 1st Duke of Beaufort
- Charles Somerset, 4th Duke of Beaufort (1709–1756), British peer and politician, younger son of Henry Somerset, 2nd Duke of Beaufort
- Charles Somerset, 8th Duke of Beaufort (1824–1899), British peer, soldier and politician
- Charlotte Sophia Somerset, Duchess of Beaufort (1771–1854), British noblewoman, wife of Henry Somerset, 6th Duke of Beaufort
- Crawford Somerset (1895–1968), New Zealand educator, academic and writer
- David Somerset (banker) (1930–2014), Chief Cashier of the Bank of England
- David Somerset, 11th Duke of Beaufort (1928–2017), English peer and landowner
- Lord Edward Somerset (1776–1842), British soldier, son of the 5th Duke of Beaufort
- Edward Arthur Somerset (1817–1886), British soldier and politician
- Edward Somerset, 2nd Marquess of Worcester (1602/3–1667), English peer, Royalist and inventor, son of Henry Somerset, 1st Marquess of Worcester
- Edward Somerset, 4th Earl of Worcester (c.1550–1628), English peer and courtier
- Elizabeth Somerset, Baroness Herbert (c.1476–1507), English noblewoman, daughter of William Herbert, 2nd Earl of Pembroke
- Elizabeth Somerset, Countess of Worcester (1502–1565), English courtier
- Elizabeth Somerset, Countess of Worcester (1546–1621), Scottish-born noblewoman
- Elizabeth Somerset, Duchess of Beaufort (c. 1713–1799), English noblewoman
- Emily Somerset, Lady Raglan (1792–1881), British noblewoman and political hostess
- FitzRoy Somerset, 1st Baron Raglan (1788–1855), British peer and army officer
- FitzRoy Somerset, 4th Baron Raglan (1885–1964), British soldier and author
- FitzRoy Somerset, 5th Baron Raglan (1927–2010), British peer
- Frances Somerset, Duchess of Beaufort (1711–1750), British noblewoman and heiress
- George Somerset, 3rd Baron Raglan (1857–1921), British soldier and politician
- Georgiana Somerset, Marchioness of Worcester (1792–1821), first wife of Henry Somerset, 7th Duke of Beaufort
- Georgie Somerset (born 1967), Australian farmer and grazier
- Georgina Somerset (1923–2013), British Royal Navy officer, dentist and author
- Geoffrey Somerset, 6th Baron Raglan (1932–2025), British peer and politician
- Lord Granville Somerset (1792–1848), British politician
- Gwen Somerset (1894–1988), New Zealand educator and writer
- Henry de Somerset (died 1307), English cleric, Dean of Exeter
- Lady Henry Somerset (1851–1921), British philanthropist, temperance leader and campaigner for women's rights
- Lord Henry Somerset (1849–1932), British politician and popular music composer
- Henry Somerset (British Army officer) (1794–1862), British soldier
- Henry Plantagenet Somerset (1852–1936), pastoralist and politician in Queensland, Australia
- Henry Somerset, 1st Duke of Beaufort (1629–1700), English peer and politician
- Henry Somerset, 2nd Duke of Beaufort (1684–1714), English peer and politician
- Henry Somerset, 6th Duke of Beaufort (1766–1835), British peer and politician
- Henry Somerset, 7th Duke of Beaufort (1792–1853), British peer, soldier and politician
- Henry Somerset, 9th Duke of Beaufort (1847–1924), British peer
- Henry Somerset, 10th Duke of Beaufort (1900–1984), British peer, landowner and fox-hunter
- Henry Somerset, 12th Duke of Beaufort (born 1952), British peer and landowner
- Henry Somerset, 2nd Earl of Worcester (c. 1496–1549), English peer
- Henry Somerset, 1st Marquess of Worcester (1577–1646), English peer and Royalist
- James Somerset (c. 1741 – after 1772), African slave who was party to the legal case Somerset v. Stewart
- John Somerset (died 1454), English physician and academic administrator
- Lord John Somerset (1787–1846), British soldier, son of the 5th Duke of Beaufort
- Lenore Somerset (1931–2006), Australian folk singer
- Leveson Somerset (1829–1900), British Royal Navy officer
- Lucy Somerset (c.1524–1583), English noblewoman, daughter of Henry Somerset, 2nd Earl of Worcester
- Lady Mary Isabella Somerset (1756–1831), British society hostess
- Mary Somerset, Duchess of Beaufort (gardener) (bapt.1630–1715), English noblewoman, gardener and botanist
- Mary Somerset, Duchess of Beaufort (sportswoman) (1897–1987), British princess and sportswoman
- Pat Somerset (1897–1974), English actor
- Poulett Somerset (1822–1875), British soldier and politician
- Ralph Somerset (c.1835–1891), English cleric
- Richard Gay Somerset (1848–1928), British painter
- Richard Somerset, 2nd Baron Raglan (1817–1884), British peer
- Sebastian Somerset (born 2001), British swimmer
- Thomas Somerset (by 1529 – 1586), English Catholic Member of Parliament
- Thomas Somerset (MP for Oxford) (fl. 1379–1393), English draper and Member of Parliament
- Thomas Somerset (Northern Ireland politician) (1870–1947), British industrialist and Member of Parliament
- Thomas Somerset, 1st Viscount Somerset (1579–1651), English courtier and politician
- Lord William Somerset (1784–1851), English Anglican cleric
- William Somerset, 3rd Earl of Worcester (c.1527–1589), English peer, courtier and politician
- Willie Somerset (born 1942), American basketball player

== See also ==
- Somers (surname)
