= Elizabeth Danvers =

English noblewoman

Elizabeth Neville
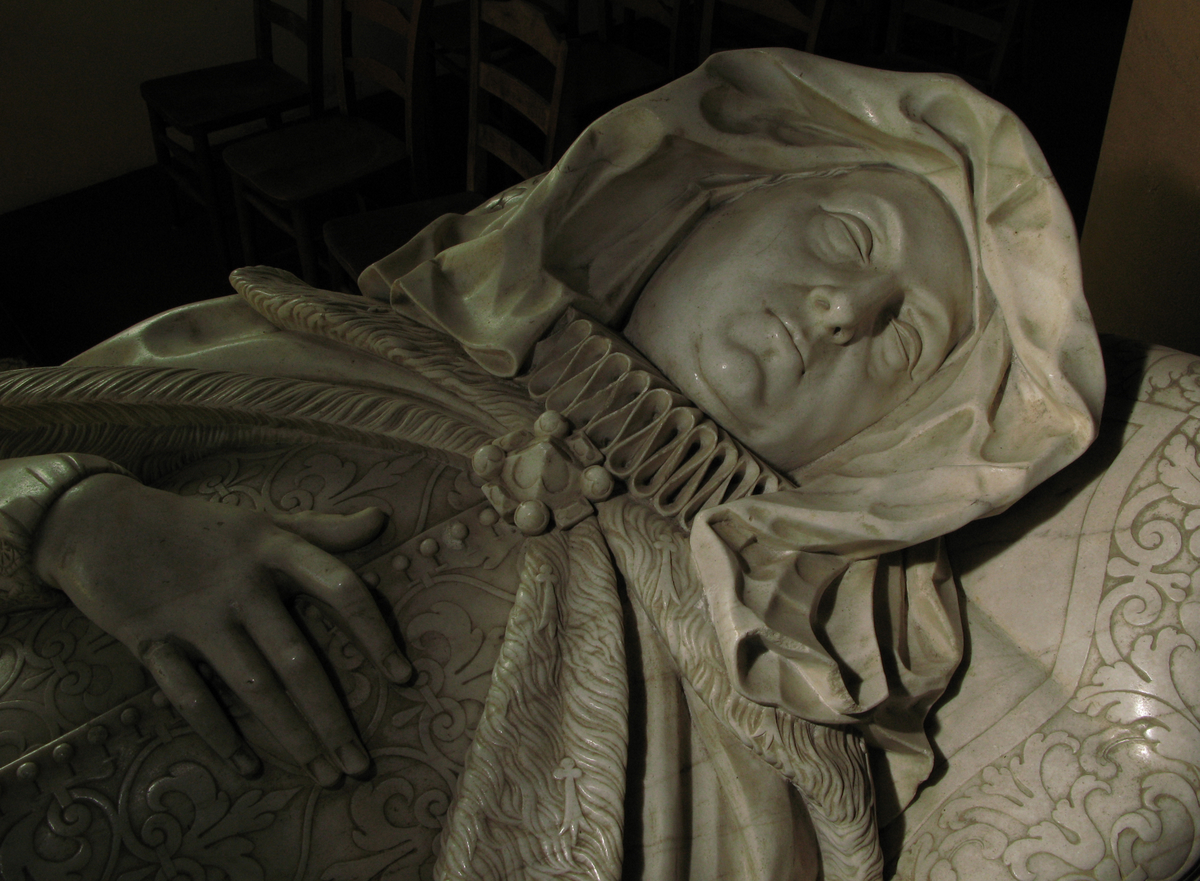
- Monument to Elizabeth Neville in St Michael's Church, Stowe, Northamptonshire
- Born: c.1545
- Died: 1630
- Noble family: House of Neville
- Spouse: Sir John Danvers
- Issue: Sir Charles Danvers; Henry Danvers, 1st Earl of Danby; Sir John Danvers; Lucy Danvers; Elizabeth Danvers; Eleanor Danvers; Anne Danvers; Catherine Danvers; Mary Danvers; Dorothy Danvers
- Father: John Neville, 4th Baron Latimer
- Mother: Lucy Somerset

Lady Elizabeth Danvers née Neville, later Lady Elizabeth Carey by remarriage (1545/50–1630) was an English noblewoman. She was the mother of Sir Charles Danvers, executed in 1601 for his part in the rebellion of Robert Devereux, 2nd Earl of Essex, and of Sir John Danvers, one of the commissioners who tried King Charles I and signed the King's death warrant.

== Family ==
Elizabeth Neville, born between 1545 and 1550, was the youngest daughter of John Neville, 4th Baron Latimer, and Lucy Somerset, the daughter of Henry Somerset, 2nd Earl of Worcester, by his second wife, Elizabeth Browne, the daughter of Sir Anthony Browne, Lieutenant of Calais, by his second wife, Lucy Neville, daughter of John Neville, 1st Marquess of Montagu. She had three elder sisters:

- Katherine Neville (1545/6 – 28 October 1596), who married firstly, Henry Percy, 8th Earl of Northumberland, and secondly, Francis Fitton of Binfield, Berkshire.
- Dorothy Neville (1548–1609), who married Thomas Cecil, 1st Earl of Exeter, eldest son of Lord Burghley.
- Lucy Neville (c.1549 – April 1608), who married Sir William Cornwallis (c.1551–1611) of Brome, Suffolk.

== Life ==
The antiquarian and biographer, John Aubrey, whose ancestor she was, describes her in his Brief Lives (1693), stating that she had Chaucer at her fingers' ends:

Elizabeth Danvers, his mother, an Italian,[sic] prodigeous parts for a Woman. I have heard my father’s mother say that she had Chaucer at her fingers' ends. A great Politician; great Witt and spirit, but revengeful: knew how to manage her estate as well as any man; understood Jewels as well as any Jeweller. Very Beautiful, but only short-sighted. To obtain Pardons for her Sonnes she maryed Sir Edmund Carey, cosen-german to Queen Elizabeth, but kept him to hard meate.

Elizabeth married firstly, Sir John Danvers (1540 – 10 December 1594) of Dauntsey, Wiltshire, the son of Sylvester Danvers (1518–1549?) and his first wife, Elizabeth Mordaunt, second daughter of John Mordaunt, 1st Baron Mordaunt of Turvey in Bedfordshire, and the grandson of Thomas Danvers (d.1532) and Margaret Courtenay, the youngest daughter of Sir William Courtenay (1451–1512) of Powderham Castle, Devon, by Cecily Cheney, the daughter of Sir John Cheney of Pincourt.

Elizabeth Neville and Sir John Danvers had three sons and seven daughters:

- Sir Charles Danvers (c.1568–1601), who died without issue.
- Sir Henry Danvers (1573–1644), who died without issue.
- Sir John Danvers (28 June 1588 – 16 April 1655), who married firstly, about 1609, Magdalen Newport (d.1627), the daughter of Sir Richard Newport of High Ercall, Shropshire. At the time of the marriage, Magdalen Newport had been for twelve years the widow of Richard Herbert of Montgomery Castle, by whom she had ten children, including Edward Herbert, 1st Baron Herbert of Cherbury, and the poet, George Herbert. The year after Magdalen's death, Sir John Danvers married secondly, Elizabeth Dauntsey (d.1636), the daughter and coheir of Sir Ambrose Dauntsey, esquire, by whom he had several children. After remaining a widower for twelve years, he married thirdly, in 1648, Grace Hewes (d.1670), the daughter of Thomas Hewes of Kemerton, Worcestershire, by whom he had a son, John Danvers.
- Lucy Danvers (1572–1621), who married Sir Henry Baynton of Bromham, Wiltshire.
- Elizabeth Danvers, who married, as his second wife, Sir Edward Hoby of Bisham Abbey, Berkshire.
- Eleanor Danvers (d.1601), who married Sir Thomas Walmesley of Dunkenhalgh, Lancashire, from whom are descended the Dukes of Leeds.
- Anne Danvers, who married Sir Arthur Porter of Lanteney, Gloucestershire.
- Katherine Danvers, who married Sir Richard Gargrave of Nostel, Yorkshire.
- Mary Danvers, who predeceased her father.
- Dorothy Danvers (1590–1650), who married Sir Peter Osborne of Chicksands, Bedfordshire, by whom she was the mother of Dorothy Osborne.

On 4 October 1594 Lady Danvers' second son, Henry Danvers, killed Henry Long, the younger brother of Walter Long (died 1610), in the course of a local feud. Accounts of the murder conflict in some details. According to Lady Danvers' version of events, her husband, Sir John Danvers, in his capacity as a justice of the peace, had learned of two robberies and a murder committed by the servants of Sir Walter Long. Sir Walter, his brothers and his followers had then turned against Danvers, and members of the Long faction had murdered one of Sir John Danvers' men and committed a number of other outrages. Letters were exchanged between members of the Danvers and Long families, and in a letter to Sir Charles Danvers, Henry Long threatened to whip him, and called him 'Asse, Puppie, ffoole & Boy'. Sir Charles and others sought out Henry Long at an 'ordinary' or inn in Corsham, and cudgelled him, but found the door locked when they were ready to leave. Long drew his sword against Sir Charles, dangerously wounding him, and Sir Henry Danvers shot Long. The Danvers brothers fled to Whitley Lodge near Titchfield Abbey in Hampshire, where their friend, Henry Wriothesley, 3rd Earl of Southampton, sheltered them. They were outlawed, and eventually escaped to the continent where they took refuge at the court of King Henri IV.

The disaster which had befallen his sons may have hastened the death of Sir John Danvers, who died two months later, on 19 December 1594, and was buried in Dauntsey church. He is commemorated in verses composed by his relative by marriage, the poet George Herbert, after viewing his portrait:

Passe not by.

Search and you may
Find a treasure
Worth your stay.
What makes a Danvers
Would you find?
In a fayre bodie
A fayre mind.
Sir John Danvers' earthly part
Here is copied out by art;
But his heavenly and divine,

In his progenie doth shine....

In 1598 the widowed Lady Danvers married Sir Edmund Carey (c.1557 – 12 September 1637), son of Henry Carey, 1st Baron Hunsdon, a cousin of Queen Elizabeth. It was generally considered she did so in order to obtain a pardon for her sons. Other efforts were made on their behalf as well, and at the end of June 1598 Queen Elizabeth relented, and pardoned both the Danvers brothers on condition that they pay Sir Walter Long £1500 damages for the murder of his brother. On 30 August 1598 John Chamberlain noted that Sir Charles and Sir Henry Danvers had arrived in London.

In February 1601, Sir Charles Danvers took part in Essex' short-lived rebellion, and was convicted of treason. He offered to pay £10,000 for his life, but to no avail. He was beheaded on Tower Hill on 18 March 1601.

After Essex's execution, Sir Henry Danvers served with the English forces in Ireland under Charles Blount, 8th Baron Mountjoy, and on 21 July 1603, shortly after his accession, King James I created him Baron Danvers of Dauntsey 'for his valiant service at Kinsale in Ireland'. In 1604 the verdict of outlawry against the Danvers brothers was reversed.

Lady Carey's third son, Sir John Danvers, was a regicide after the First English Civil War.

Lady Carey died in 1630, aged 84, and was buried under an altar tomb in St. Michael’s Church at Church Stowe in Stowe Nine Churches, Northamptonshire. The monument by Nicholas Stone, master mason to King James I, was installed about 1620 during her lifetime, and is said to be 'one of the finest pieces of sculpture of the age'.
