= Thomas Somerset =

English Roman Catholic layman

Thomas Somerset (born by 1529, died 6 April 1586) was an English Roman Catholic layman, kept imprisoned for long periods by Elizabeth I of England.

== Life ==
He was the second son of Henry Somerset, 2nd Earl of Worcester.

He became a servant of Bishop Stephen Gardiner, and was MP for Monmouthshire in 1553 and 1554.

He was committed to the Fleet prison, 10 June 1562, "for translating an oratyon out of Frenche, made by the Cardinall of Lorraine", i.e. Charles, Cardinal of Lorraine, Archbishop of Reims, "and putting the same without authority in prynte". On 27 June 1562, he was summoned before the Lords of the Council at Greenwich, who expected "an humble submission, for wante whereof, and for that he seamed to go about to justifye his cause, he was returned to the Flete, there to remaine until he" should "have better considered of himself".

After an imprisonment of close on twenty years he was released on bail, 28 February 1581-82, to attend to legal business in Monmouthshire. On 2 May 1582, he was too ill to travel, and was permitted to remain at liberty till he should recover. By 22 October 1585, suspected of complicity with Mary Queen of Scots, he was in the Tower on a charge of high treason. Being possessed of properties in Gloucestershire and Monmouthshire, he paid the costs of his imprisonment, and his name therefore is not to be found in the Tower Bills. He died 6 April 1586 in the Tower, and his will was proved on 27 May of the same year.

== Ancestry ==
Ancestors of Thomas Somerset

16. Edmund Beaufort, 2nd Duke of Somerset
8. Henry Beaufort, 3rd Duke of Somerset
17. Lady Eleanor Beauchamp
4. Charles Somerset, 1st Earl of Worcester
9. Joan Hill
2. Henry Somerset, 2nd Earl of Worcester
20. William Herbert, 1st Earl of Pembroke
10. William Herbert, 2nd Earl of Pembroke
21. Anne Devereux
5. Lady Elizabeth Herbert, 3rd Baroness Herbert
22. Richard Woodville, 1st Earl Rivers
11. Lady Mary Woodville
23. Jacquetta of Luxembourg
1. Thomas Somerset
24. Sir Richard Browne
12. Sir Thomas Browne
6. Sir Anthony Browne
26. Sir Thomas FitzAlan
13. Eleanor FitzAlan
27. Joan Moyne
3. Elizabeth Browne
28. Richard Neville, 5th Earl of Salisbury
14. John Neville, 1st Marquess of Montagu
29. Alice Montacute, 5th Countess of Salisbury
7. Lady Lucy Neville
30. Sir Edmund Ingoldsthorpe
15. Isabel Ingoldesthorpe
31. Joan Tiptoft
