= Elizabeth Somerset =

Elizabeth Somerset may refer to:

- Elizabeth Herbert, Marchioness of Powis (c. 1634–1691), née Lady Elizabeth Somerset
- Elizabeth Somerset, Baroness Herbert (c. 1476–1507), wife of Charles Somerset, Baron Herbert
- Elizabeth Somerset, Countess of Worcester (1502–1565), wife of Henry Somerset, 2nd Earl of Worcester
- Elizabeth Somerset, Countess of Worcester (1546–1621), wife of Edward Somerset, 4th Earl of Worcester
- Elizabeth Somerset, Duchess of Beaufort (née Berkeley; c. 1713–1799)
