= James Ormiston (conspirator) =

16th-century Scottish landowner and convicted conspirator

James Ormiston, Laird of Ormiston (died 14 December 1573) was a Scottish landowner. As an ally and cousin of James Hepburn, 4th Earl of Bothwell, he was suspected of involvement in the 1567 murder of Lord Darnley and executed.

== Career ==
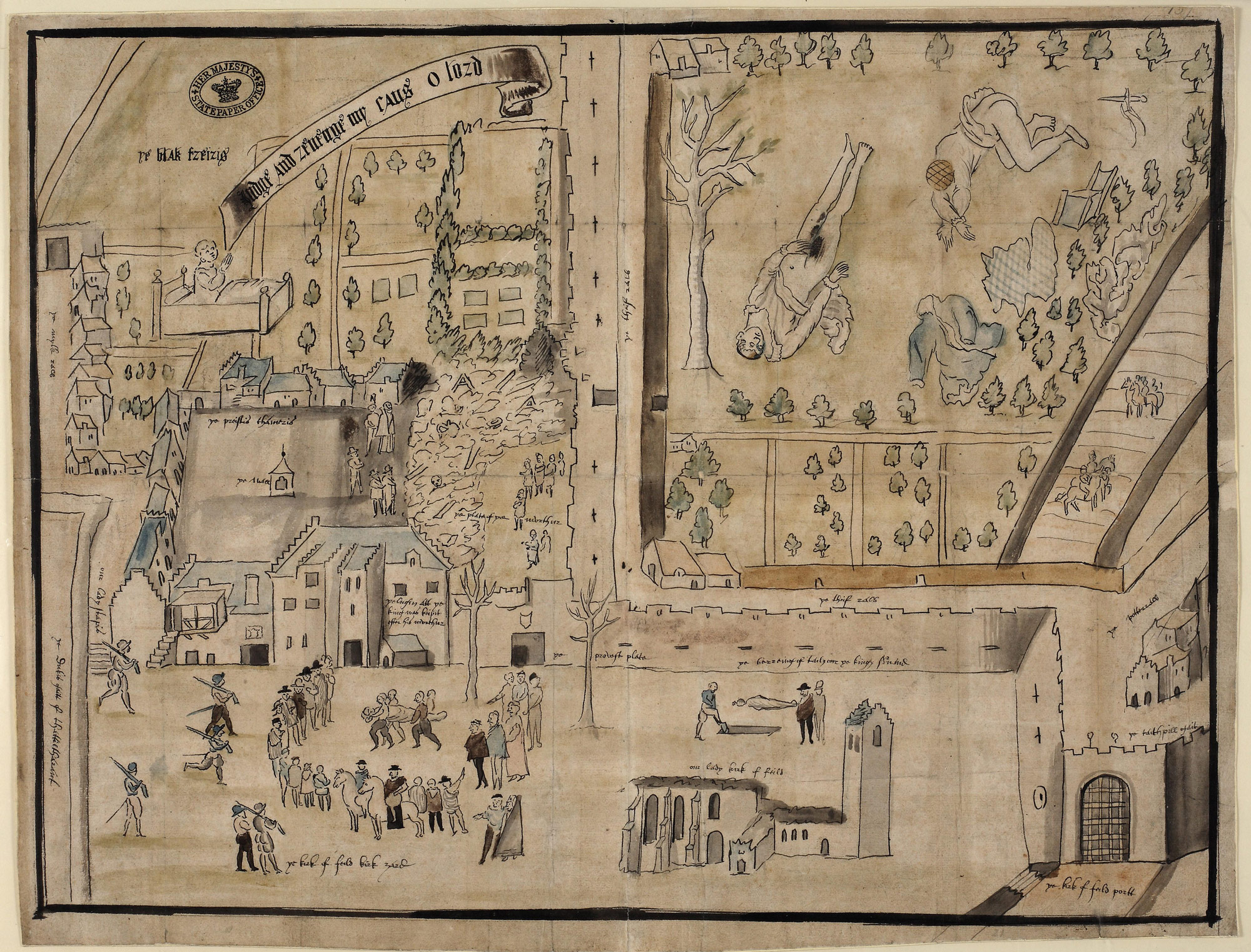
James Ormiston gave detailed instructions on how to light the fuse at the Kirk o' Field

As a Scottish landowner, he was sometimes known as James Ormiston of that ilk. His lands were at Ormiston in Teviotdale near Eckford, not the Ormiston in East Lothian which belonged to the Cockburn family. James Ormiston was sometimes called "Black Ormiston" or the "Black Laird" from the iron colour of his complexion. Hob or Robert Ormiston, also accused of involvement in Darnley's murder, was his uncle. Hob Ormiston had served as a messenger in the household of James V.

James Ormiston married Margaret Sinclair, the widow of John Sinclair of Herdmanston. Some older writers mention a "John Ormiston", which seems to be a mistake for "James". In 1559, a John Ormiston was the Earl of Bothwell's bailiff, living at Moss Tower at Eckford. Ormiston attended a meeting at Dunbar Castle in December 1560, where the return of Mary, Queen of Scots, from France was discussed, her husband Francis II of France was known to be unwell.

Mary, Queen of Scots, gave James Ormiston the role of escorting the English ambassador Thomas Randolph from Edinburgh towards Berwick-upon-Tweed on 2 March 1566. Ormiston asked Randolph to meet the Earl of Bothwell south of Seton Palace. At Dunbar, Ormiston's kinsman the Laird of Whitelaw (in Morebattle) took over the escort. Randolph wrote that the Laird of Whitelaw's surname was "Hepburn", but it was "Whytelaw". Patrick Whytelaw was made captain of Dunbar Castle after Simon Preston. Ormiston is said to have been the leader of Mary's guard when she stayed at Jedburgh in October 1566.

Before Bothwell abducted and married Mary, Nicolas Hubert (French Paris) and James Ormiston rode from Linlithgow Palace to Hatton House near Wilkieston with a letter from Mary for Bothwell. Ormiston and Patrick Whytelaw were knighted when Bothwell was made Duke of Orkney.

The Confederate Lords opposed Mary and Bothwell. She left Edinburgh for Borthwick Castle, then joined Bothwell at Dunbar. Her secretary Claude Nau mentioned in his memoir that Ormiston joined her at Dunbar. When Bothwell left Mary at the battle of Carberry Hill, according to Nau, he gave her a copy of a band signed by the lords who had agreed to the removal of Lord Darnley. Ormiston would subsequently confess to knowledge of this band. The band or a similar document was said to have been drawn up at Craigmillar Castle.

== Outlaw ==
According to the confession of John Hay, younger of Tallo, Ormiston helped receive gunpowder for the conspirators at Edinburgh's Blackfriar's Gate. He lodged nearby in a street on the south side of the High Street. The gunpowder was transferred into bags called "polks" and taken to the Kirk o'Field. A barrel of powder was too big to fit through the door. Hay said that Ormiston gave instructions to John Hepburn of Bowton to light the powder after it was placed in the nether house beneath Darnley's bedchamber. Bothwell was said to have held a meeting with the conspirators at his lodgings in Holyrood Palace in the afternoon before the explosion on 10 February 1567.

Regent Moray took action against Ormiston and his family. In August 1567, the Privy Council ordered James Ormiston to surrender the "towers and fortalices" of Ormiston and Nether Ancrum. His kinsman, William Ormiston of Westhouse was accused of helping the rebels James and Robert Ormiston. William Ormiston's family was evicted from the Place of Westhouse and their possessions taken by Alexander Hoppringill, a servant of the laird of Cessford. Although William Ormiston was quickly pardoned, Hoppringill retained the mill at Westhouse and fishing rights in the River Tweed for a time. It was said that the wife of William or John Ormiston refused to leave the tower at Westhouse. The Westhouse estate, to the west of Gattonside, later became known as Pavilion House.

In September 1567, Ormiston's wife Margaret Sinclair was ordered to surrender her house at Herdmanston to her former husband's executors. The Parliament of Scotland declared James Ormiston and Hob Ormiston outlaws for Darnley's murder in December 1567. The accounts of the treasurer of Scotland include some details of the legal process of his forfeiture. The painter Walter Binning made copies of Ormiston's coat of arms, and those of John Hepburn of Bowtoun, John Hay younger of Tallo, and the Earl of Bothwell, to be ceremonially torn in half at Parliament.

After Mary's defeat at the battle of Langside, Ormiston remained in Scotland as a guest of Patrick Whytelaw. He is said to have carried letters to Mary at Carlisle Castle.

=== After the Rising of the North ===
Ormiston accompanied Anne Percy, Countess of Northumberland and Thomas Percy, 7th Earl of Northumberland in Liddesdale in December 1569. They were exiles in Scotland in the aftermath of the Rising of the North. Ormiston had offered to be their guide with John Armstrong of the Side and Lord's Jock or Laird's Jock, but he was challenged by Martin Elwood (Martin Elliot of Braidlie near Castleton), a significant man in the Liddesdale community on 21 December. Elwood or Elliot was following Regent Moray's edict against supporting the English rebels.

The Earl and Countess of Northumberland sought help from other members of the Armstrong family including Hector Armstrong of Harlaw . According to the Scottish chronicle known as the Diurnal of Occurents there was another confrontation and Captain John Borthwick was killed. Hector Armstrong surrendered the Earl to Regent Moray and the Earl of Morton and he was taken to Lochleven Castle. The Countess remained with John of the Side at Kirk Hill in Liddesdale and was afterwards sheltered at Ferniehirst Castle. According to English reports, the Liddesdale men stole goods and horses from the Northumberlands. The Diurnal of Occurents claims that Ormiston took her jewels, clothing, and money including 600 Portuguese gold ducats.

== Arrest and execution ==
On 10 November 1573, James Ormiston was discovered asleep in the Hawkwood near Jedburgh by Regent Morton and Sir John Carmichael. Carmichael had to wrestle with Ormiston, who was taken to Edinburgh Castle. Ormiston was interviewed by the kirk minister John Brand and described a band sworn by Bothwell's adherents to remove Mary's husband. Ormiston told Brand that he gave advice to the conspirators, including French Paris, on how to light the fuse at the Kirk o'Field. He was taken from Edinburgh Castle and hanged on 14 December 1573.
