= Lucy Somerset =

English noblewoman

Lady Lucy Neville, Baroness Latimer
- Born: Lady Lucy Somerset c. 1524
- Died: 23 February 1583
- Family: Beaufort
- Spouse: John Neville, 4th Baron Latimer
- Issue: Katherine Neville, Countess of Northumberland; Dorothy Neville, Countess of Exeter; Lucy Neville; Elizabeth Neville
- Father: Henry Somerset, 2nd Earl of Worcester
- Mother: Elizabeth Browne

Lady Lucy Neville, Baroness Latimer (née Somerset; c. 1524 – 23 February 1583) was an English noblewoman and the daughter of Henry Somerset, 2nd Earl of Worcester and his second wife, Elizabeth Browne. Lucy served as a Maid of Honour to Queen Consort Katherine Howard. Lucy married in 1545, John Neville, 4th Baron Latimer, the stepson of King Henry's sixth consort Catherine Parr to whom Lucy served in the capacity of Lady-in-waiting.

== Family ==
Lucy Somerset was born about 1524 to Henry Somerset, 2nd Earl of Worcester, and his second wife, Elizabeth Browne, the daughter of Sir Anthony Browne, Governor of Queenborough and Lieutenant of Calais and his second wife, Lucy Neville, daughter of John Neville, 1st Marquess of Montagu. Montagu was a brother to Lady Alice FitzHugh, great-grandmother of Queen Consort Katherine Parr. Through Lucy's aunt's marriage to Sir Charles Brandon, later Duke of Suffolk, she was a first cousin of Anne Brandon, and her younger sister, Mary.

== At the royal court ==
Lucy was sent to the court of Henry VIII where she served his fifth consort, Queen Katherine Howard as a Maid of Honour. In 1542, when the Queen was awaiting execution for High Treason after having been found guilty of adultery, Lucy was mentioned in a letter by Imperial Ambassador Eustace Chapuys to his master Charles V, Holy Roman Emperor as having been one of the three ladies in whom the King was showing a marked interest and was considering for his sixth wife. The other two women were Elizabeth Brooke and Anne Basset.

However, in 1543, the King chose for his sixth consort, the Dowager Lady Latimer, Katherine Parr. After her marriage in 1545, Lucy was invited to become lady-in-waiting to Queen Katherine as the new Lady Latimer. Lucy became part of the close knit circle around the queen.

== Marriage and issue ==
In 1545, she married Queen Katherine Parr's stepson, John Neville, 4th Baron Latimer (c. 1520 – 22 April 1577), making her the new Baroness Latimer. Together they had four daughters who became co-heiresses to John and the barony of Latimer:

- Katherine Neville (1546 – 28 October 1596), married Henry Percy, 8th Earl of Northumberland, by whom she had issue.
- Dorothy Neville (1547 – 23 March 1609), married Thomas Cecil, 1st Earl of Exeter, by whom she had issue.
- Lucy Neville (died April 1608), married Sir William Cornwallis of Brome Hall, by whom she had issue.
- Elizabeth Neville (c. 1550 – 1630), married firstly Sir John Danvers of Dauntsey, by whom she had issue, she married secondly Sir Edmund Carey.

All of their daughter's first marriages above produced children.

Lord Latimer died without sons in 1577; his four daughters became his joint heiresses. The barony became abeyant until 1913, when its abeyance was terminated in favour of Latimer's distant descendant Francis Money-Coutts, 5th Baron Latymer.

== Death ==
Lucy died on 23 February 1583 and was buried in Hackney as she had requested in her will which was dated 16 November 1582.

== Ancestry ==
Ancestors of Lucy Somerset

16. Edmund Beaufort, 2nd Duke of Somerset
8. Henry Beaufort, 3rd Duke of Somerset
17. Lady Eleanor Beauchamp
4. Charles Somerset, 1st Earl of Worcester
9. Joan Hill
2. Henry Somerset, 2nd Earl of Worcester
20. William Herbert, 1st Earl of Pembroke
10. William Herbert, 2nd Earl of Pembroke
21. Anne Devereux
5. Lady Elizabeth Herbert, 3rd Baroness Herbert
22. Richard Woodville, 1st Earl Rivers
11. Lady Mary Woodville
23. Jacquetta of Luxembourg
1. Lady Lucy Somerset
24. Sir Richard Browne
12. Sir Thomas Browne
6. Sir Anthony Browne
26. Sir Thomas FitzAlan
13. Eleanor FitzAlan
27. Joan Moyne
3. Elizabeth Browne
28. Richard Neville, 5th Earl of Salisbury
14. John Neville, 1st Marquess of Montagu
29. Alice Montacute, 5th Countess of Salisbury
7. Lady Lucy Neville
30. Sir Edmund Ingoldsthorpe
15. Isabel Ingoldesthorpe
31. Joan Tiptoft
