= Anne Percy, Countess of Northumberland =

16th-century Countess of Northumberland

Lady Anne Somerset
- Countess of Northumberland
- Born: 1536; England
- Died: 17 October 1596 (aged 59–60); Namur
- Noble family: Beaufort (by birth) Percy (by marriage)
- Spouse: Thomas Percy, 7th Earl of Northumberland
- Issue: Elizabeth Percy; Thomas Percy; Lucy Percy; Joan Percy; Mary Percy
- Father: Henry Somerset, 2nd Earl of Worcester
- Mother: Elizabeth Browne

Anne Percy, Countess of Northumberland (née Somerset; 1536 – 17 October 1596) was an English noblewoman and one of the instigators of the Northern Rebellion against Queen Elizabeth I. To avoid punishment for her prominent role in the failed insurrection, Anne, along with her infant daughter, was forced into exile in Flanders, where she spent the rest of her life involving herself in Catholic plots and maintaining contact with the other English Catholic exiles. In Liège while living on a pension from King Philip II of Spain, she wrote Discours des troubles du Comte du Northumberland. Her husband Thomas Percy, 7th Earl of Northumberland, who had led the rebellion, was executed for treason. Three of her daughters were left behind in England and raised by their paternal uncle, Henry Percy, 8th Earl of Northumberland.

== Family ==
Lady Anne was born in 1536, the daughter of Henry Somerset, 2nd Earl of Worcester and Elizabeth Browne, daughter of Sir Anthony Browne and Lucy Neville. She had four brothers and three sisters. Anne's mother had been a lady-in-waiting to the queen consort Anne Boleyn and one of the main informants against her; she was also rumoured to have been a mistress of King Henry VIII.

Anne was a devout Roman Catholic. She was a maid of honour in the household of Queen Mary I, and in 1556 she received a gift of a gilt cruse (a kind of cup). The other maids and the mother of maids Dorothy Broughton were given similar cups.

== Marriage and issue ==
On 22 June 1558, she married Thomas Percy, 7th Earl of Northumberland, one of the most powerful nobles in Northern England, and like Anne, he practised the Catholic religion. He was the nephew of Henry Percy, 6th Earl of Northumberland, the former suitor of Anne Boleyn. They mainly resided at Topcliffe rather than Alnwick.

Together they had five children:

- Elizabeth Percy (1559–1643), married Richard Woodroffe
- Thomas Percy (born and died in 1560)
- Lucy Percy, married Sir Edward Stanley, by whom she had issue, including Venetia Stanley, wife of Sir Kenelm Digby.
- Joan Percy, married Lord Henry Seymour
- Mary Percy, abbess (1570–1642)

== Northern Rebellion ==
In the autumn of 1569, together with Jane Howard, Countess of Westmorland, Anne planned and instigated the uprising carried out by the disgruntled Catholic gentry of Northern England against Queen Elizabeth I, which became known as the Northern Rebellion or Rising of the North.

Anne and her husband exchanged letters and gifts with Mary, Queen of Scots. Mary sent Anne a paternoster of scented gold pomander beads which the Pope had sent to her, and an enamelled silver necklace. Anne sent Mary a locket given to her by a Spanish courtier of Mary I of England and a diamond ring which Mary swore to wear.

Anne's husband was reluctant to lead the rebellion, whose aim was to depose Queen Elizabeth and replace her with the imprisoned Mary, Queen of Scots, whom Catholics regarded as England's legitimate queen; however, he was soon persuaded after his servants informed him that his enemies were surrounding him. He and Anne fled to Brancepeth, the home of the Charles Neville, 6th Earl of Westmorland, who was also persuaded to take up arms against Queen Elizabeth. It was at Brancepeth where the rebellion began, headed by the two earls.

Henry Carey, 1st Baron Hunsdon, who headed a detachment of royal troops sent by the Queen to quell the rising, reported that Anne, who was pregnant at the time, had been "stouter than her husband", and rode "up and down with the army".

Her pregnancy suggested a plan for the escape of Mary, Queen of Scots from Wingfield Manor. Christine Hogg, the wife of the queen's embroiderer Bastian Pagez was pregnant, and her child was born in November 1569. Later, the Earl of Shrewsbury wrote that Mary Queen of Scots had planned to escape after the birth, dressed as Christine Hogg's midwife or nurse. The midwife's part would have been played by the Countess of Northumberland, because she and the queen were "something like in personage". The Northumberlands were staying near Wingfield at nearby Wentworth House.

== Exile ==
The Northern Rebellion failed due to its poor planning and lack of proper organization. After the insurrection was put down by Baron Hunsdon's troops, Anne and Percy fled to Scotland, where they sought refuge with Hector Graham of Harlaw, a Border outlaw. Her jewels were stolen by James Ormiston. In January 1570, she stayed at Ferniehirst Castle and Hume Castle. She was at Fast Castle in March. She went to a meeting at Linlithgow in April and then stayed at Lord Seton's house at Pluscarden. According to some sources, Anne gave birth to her daughter Mary in Old Aberdeen in June 1570.

When Hector Graham betrayed her husband to James Douglas, 4th Earl of Morton, she and her baby escaped to the Continent, sailing with Lord Seton. They arrived in Bruges on 31 August 1570. Anne sought aid from Pope Pius V and King Philip II of Spain to raise money for her husband's ransom; the Pope gave her four thousand crowns and King Philip sent her six thousands marks. It was to no avail. Anne would spend the rest of her life as an exile in Flanders, while in 1572, Earl Morton sold her husband to Queen Elizabeth who had him publicly executed at York for treason.

In Liège while living on a pension provided by King Philip, she wrote and circulated Discours des troubles du Comte du Northumberland. She spent the next decade travelling from place to place in Flanders, maintaining contact with the other English Catholic exiles. In 1573, English agents described Anne as "one of the principal practitioners at Mechlin". In 1576, she was briefly expelled from the territory to placate Queen Elizabeth, but returned shortly afterwards. Anne had a meeting with Thomas Morgan, an agent of the captive Mary, Queen of Scots, and at one stage she endeavoured with Francis Englefield to arrange a marriage between Mary and Don John of Austria.

She left her three oldest daughters behind in England when she escaped after the failed Northern Rebellion. They were raised at Petworth by her late husband's brother, Henry Percy who had succeeded as the 8th Earl of Northumberland. He was married to Katherine Neville, the eldest daughter of her half-sister, Lucy. Her youngest daughter, Mary Percy, who had accompanied her to the Continent, became the second abbess of the Benedictine convent in Brussels which she had herself founded.

== Death ==
In September 1591, Charles Paget, an exile in Antwerp, informed the Percy's that Anne had died and requested that they send her daughter Joan to Flanders to fetch her belongings. This had been only a ruse designed to enable Anne to see her daughter. In point of fact, Anne died of smallpox five years later on 17 October 1596 at a convent in Namur.

== Ancestry ==
Ancestors of Anne Percy, Countess of Northumberland

16. Edmund Beaufort, 2nd Duke of Somerset
8. Henry Beaufort, 3rd Duke of Somerset
17. Lady Eleanor Beauchamp
4. Charles Somerset, 1st Earl of Worcester
9. Joan Hill
2. Henry Somerset, 2nd Earl of Worcester
20. William Herbert, 1st Earl of Pembroke
10. William Herbert, 2nd Earl of Pembroke
21. Anne Devereux
5. Lady Elizabeth Herbert, 3rd Baroness Herbert
22. Richard Woodville, 1st Earl Rivers
11. Lady Mary Woodville
23. Jacquetta of Luxembourg
1. Anne Percy, Countess of Northumberland
24. Sir Richard Browne
12. Sir Thomas Browne
6. Sir Anthony Browne
26. Sir Thomas FitzAlan
13. Eleanor FitzAlan
27. Joan Moyne
3. Elizabeth Browne
28. Richard Neville, 5th Earl of Salisbury
14. John Neville, 1st Marquess of Montagu
29. Alice Montacute, 5th Countess of Salisbury
7. Lady Lucy Neville
30. Sir Edmund Ingoldsthorpe
15. Isabel Ingoldesthorpe
31. Joan Tiptoft
