= William Somerset, 3rd Earl of Worcester =

English courtier, nobleman and politician

The Earl of Worcester
- 3rd Earl of Worcester
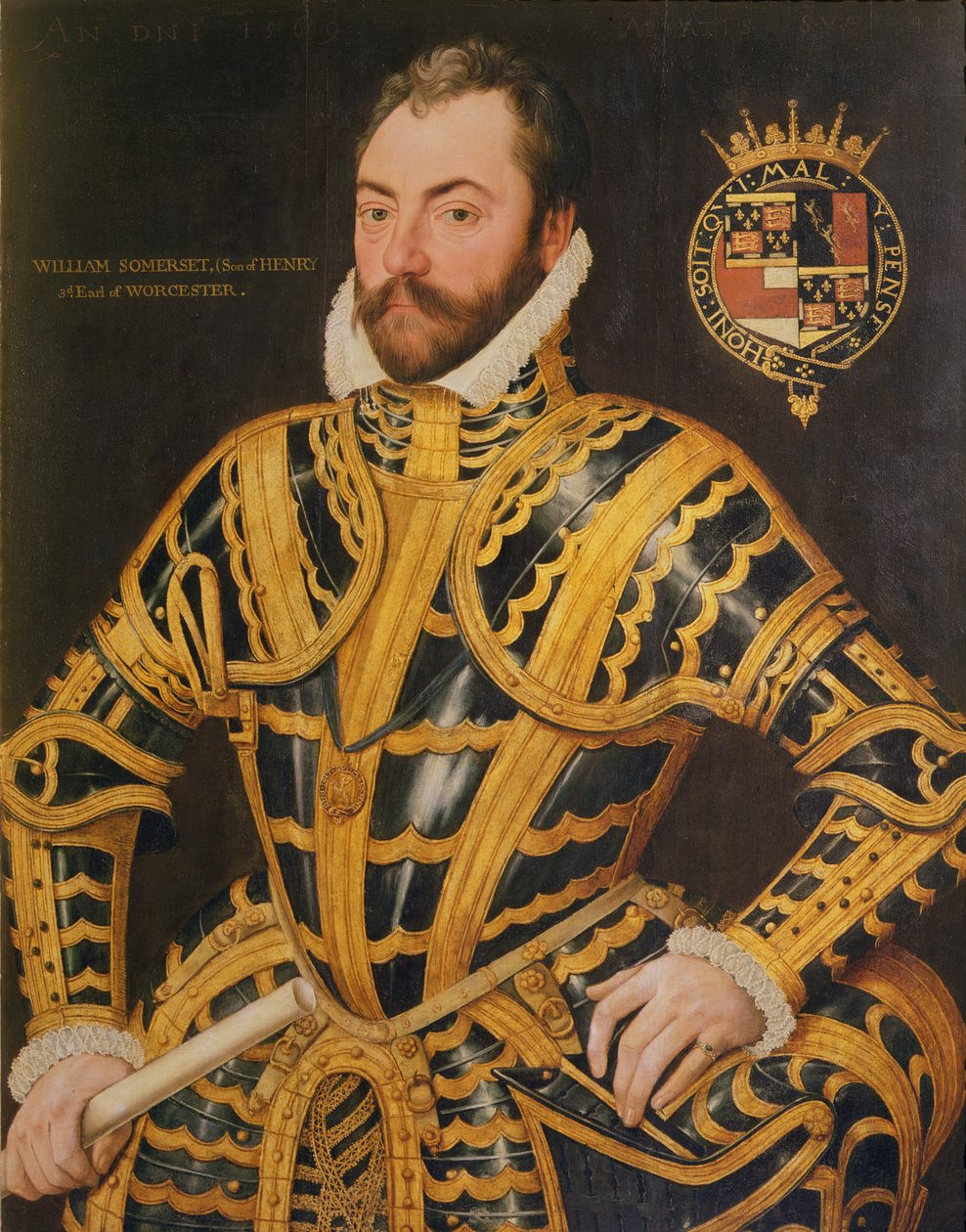
- William Somerset, 3rd Earl of Worcester in his suit of Greenwich armor
- Tenure: 1549–1589
- Successor: Edward Somerset, 4th Earl of Worcester
- Born: c. 1526/1527
- Died: 21 February 1589; Hackney
- Buried: Church of St Cadoc, Raglan, Monmouthshire
- Spouses: Christiana North; Theophila Newton
- Issue: Edward Somerset, 4th Earl of Worcester; Elizabeth Somerset; Lucy Somerset
- Parents: Henry Somerset, 2nd Earl of Worcester; Elizabeth Somerset, Countess of Worcester (d. 1565)

William Somerset, 3rd Earl of Worcester KG (c. 1526/1527 – 21 February 1589) was an English courtier, nobleman, and politician. He was the eldest son of Henry Somerset, 2nd Earl of Worcester and his second wife Elizabeth Browne.

== Earl of Worcester ==
Quartered arms of Sir William Somerset, 3rd Earl of Worcester

On 26 November 1549, he succeeded his father and became the 3rd Earl of Worcester.

Worcester supported Lady Jane Grey in 1553. He was invested as Knight Companion of the Order of the Garter (KG) in 1570. He was a patron of the arts, and sponsored - among others - the Elizabethan actor Edward Alleyn.

In January 1573, he was sent to France to the baptism of Marie Elisabeth of France. His ship was attacked by pirates, who captured a second boat carrying several of his attendants.

== Marriages and children ==
Before 19 May 1550, Worcester married Christiana North, daughter of Edward North, 1st Baron North and his wife Alice Squire. They were parents to three children:

- Edward Somerset, 4th Earl of Worcester (d. 3 March 1628).
- Elizabeth Somerset. Married William Windsor. He was a namesake son of William Windsor, 2nd Baron Windsor by his wife Margaret Sambourne.
- Lucy Somerset. Married Henry Herbert, Esquire.

William Somerset re-married (2nd) before 1567 Theophila Newton, daughter of John Newton (otherwise Cradock), Knt., of East Harptree, Somerset, by Margaret, daughter of Anthony Poyntz, Knt. A portrait of Countess Theophila by an unknown artist of that date is mentioned by Ashelford, Visual History of Costume (1983): 72.

== Death ==
William Somerset died at his house Hackney on 21 February 1589 and was buried in the Church of St Cadoc, Raglan, Monmouthshire.

== Ancestry ==
Ancestors of William Somerset, 3rd Earl of Worcester

8. Henry Beaufort, 3rd Duke of Somerset
4. Charles Somerset, 1st Earl of Worcester
9. Joan Hill
2. Henry Somerset, 2nd Earl of Worcester
10. William Herbert, 2nd Earl of Pembroke
5. Lady Elizabeth Herbert, 3rd Baroness Herbert
11. Lady Mary Woodville
1. William Somerset
12. Sir Thomas Browne
6. Sir Anthony Browne
13. Eleanor FitzAlan
3. Elizabeth Browne
14. John Neville, 1st Marquess of Montagu
7. Lady Lucy Neville
15. Isabel Ingoldesthorpe

== Notes ==
Peerage of England
| Preceded by Henry Somerset | Earl of Worcester; 1549–1589 | Succeeded by Edward Somerset |
