= John Danvers (died 1594) =

English politician

Sir John Danvers (1540 – 19 December 1594) of Dauntsey, Wiltshire and Cirencester, Gloucestershire, was an English politician.

He was the eldest son of Sylvester Danvers (d. 1551) of Dauntsey, by his first wife Elizabeth, daughter of John Mordaunt, 1st Baron Mordaunt. He inherited a substantial estate in Wiltshire, Gloucestershire and Oxfordshire as a minor. His wardship was acquired by Sir John Gates and then sold to his uncle Sir Anthony Hungerford. Through his marriage, he obtained Danby Castle and large estates in Yorkshire. He was knighted in 1574.

He served as a Justice of the Peace (JP) for Wiltshire from around 1573 and High Sheriff of Wiltshire for 1574–75, 1585–86 and 1593. He was also a JP for Gloucestershire from around 1583, and High Sheriff of Gloucestershire for 1593–94. He was a member of the Council in the Marches of Wales from 1594.

He was a Member (MP) of the Parliament of England for Wiltshire in 1571 and for Malmesbury in 1572. His acquisition of the borough of Cirencester meant that he also controlled that seat, for which his son Charles sat in the 1580s. His own failure to sit in the later Elizabethan parliaments, while he remained active in local affairs, may have been due to his religious views having been inclined towards Catholicism.

He died in 1594 and was buried in Dauntsey church.

== Family ==
He married Elizabeth, the daughter and co-heiress of John Nevill, 4th Baron Latimer, with whom he had a large family. There were three sons and six daughters living at the time of his Inquisition post mortem in 1595:

- Charles was executed for treason in 1601.
- Henry was created Earl of Danby.
- John was a signatory of Charles I's death warrant.
- Anne married Sir Arthur Porter of Llanthony, Gloucester
- Lucy married Sir Henry Baynton of Bromham, Wiltshire.
- Eleanor (d. 1601) married Thomas Walmesley of Dunkenhalgh, Lancashire.
- Elizabeth (d. 1611/12) married Edward Hoby of Bisham Abbey, Berkshire as his second wife.
- Katherine married Sir Richard Gargrave of Nostell Priory, Yorkshire
- Dorothy married Sir Peter Osborne of Chicksands Priory, Bedfordshire.
