= John Danvers (disambiguation) =

John Danvers (c. 1585–1655) was an English courtier and politician.

John Danvers may also refer to:

- John Danvers (15th-century MP), for Oxfordshire (UK Parliament constituency)
- John Danvers (died 1594), MP for Wiltshire and Malmesbury
