= Lucy Neville =

Lucy Neville

- Lucy Somerset (c.1524 - 1583), married name Lucy Neville, English noblewoman, lady-in-waiting to stepmother-in-law, Queen Katherine Parr and Parr's predecessor
- Lucy Neville-Rolfe (born 1953), British businesswoman and politician
