= Anne Percy =

Anne Percy may refer to:

- Anne Somerset, Countess of Northumberland (1538 – 1596), English noblewoman, one of the instigators of the Northern Rebellion; married name Anne Percy
- Anne Percy, Countess of Arundel (before 1485 – 1552), English noblewoman; married name Anne FitzAlan
