= John Neville, 4th Baron Latimer =

English peer

- Born: c. 1520
- Died: 22 April 1577
- Noble family: Neville
- Spouse: Lucy Somerset
- Issue: Katherine Neville; Dorothy Neville; Lucy Neville; Elizabeth Neville
- Father: John Neville, 3rd Baron Latimer
- Mother: Dorothy de Vere

John Neville, 4th Baron Latimer (c. 1520 – 22 April 1577) was an English peer, and the stepson of Catherine Parr, later the sixth wife of King Henry VIII.

== Early life ==
John Neville, born about 1520, was the only son of John Neville, 3rd Baron Latimer, by his first wife, Dorothy de Vere, daughter of Sir George Vere (died 1503) (son of John de Vere, 12th Earl of Oxford) by Margaret, daughter and heiress of Sir William Stafford of Bishop's Frome, Herefordshire. Dorothy de Vere was the sister and co-heiress of John de Vere, 14th Earl of Oxford. She died 7 February 1527, and was buried at Well, North Yorkshire. After her death the 3rd Baron married secondly, on 20 July 1528, Elizabeth Musgrave, the daughter of Sir Edward Musgrave, by whom he had no issue. After his second wife's death, he contracted a marriage, in 1533, with Catherine, Lady Borough, the widow of Sir Edward Borough, by whom he also had no issue.

Catherine is said to have been a kind stepmother to the 3rd Baron's two children, John and Margaret. In her will, dated 23 March 1545, Margaret stated that she was unable to render Catherine sufficient thanks 'for the godly education and tender love and bountiful goodness which I have evermore found in her Highness'.

There is some indication that Margaret was the 3rd Baron's father's favourite child, which, if true, might explain the turbulence which followed as John got older. As a teenager, John proved to be a confident sulking, lying, and over-sensitive boy. The 3rd Baron did not name his son as heir to his properties, and ensured that his son could not meddle with his inheritance or father's legacy. In the 3rd Baron's will, his wife Catherine was named guardian of his daughter, and was put in charge of the 4th Baron's affairs, which were to be given over to his daughter when she reached the age of majority.

In January 1537, Neville, his sister Margaret, and step-mother Catherine were held hostage at Snape Castle during the Pilgrimage of Grace. The rebels ransacked the house and sent word to the 3rd Baron, who was returning from London, that if he did not return immediately they would kill his family. When they returned to the castle he somehow talked the rebels into releasing his family and leaving, but the aftermath to follow with Latimer would prove to be taxing on the whole family.

== Later life ==
John Neville became 4th Baron Latimer at his father's death on 2 March 1543. Catherine remained close to her former stepchildren, and made the 4th Baron's wife, Lucy Somerset, a lady-in-waiting upon marrying King Henry VIII and becoming queen.

In May 1544, the 4th Baron was involved with the siege of Edinburgh in Scotland and he was there knighted at Butterdean near Coldingham. He then went to war in France where he took part in the siege of Abbeville.

The 4th baron was emotionally unstable in later life. In the summer of 1553, he was sent to Fleet Prison on charges of violence done to a servant. He was arrested for attempted rape and assault in 1557, and in 1563 he killed a man. Of the situation in 1553, Thomas Edwards wrote to the Earl of Rutland describing the violence which had taken place with the servant quoting "too great a villainy for a noble man, my thought." That this public violence occurred after the death of his step-mother, Catherine, might suggest that at least she had some sort of control over Neville while she was alive.

The 4th Baron died without male issue in 1577, at which time the title was wrongfully assumed by Richard Neville (died 27 May 1590) of Penwyn and Wyke Sapie, Worcestershire, only son of William Neville (15 July 1497 – c. 1545), second son of Richard Neville, 2nd Baron Latimer. However, according to modern doctrine, the barony fell into abeyance among the 4th Baron's four daughters until 1913, when it was determined in favour of Francis Money-Coutts, 5th Baron Latymer, a descendant of the 4th Baron's daughter Lucy.

== Marriage and issue ==
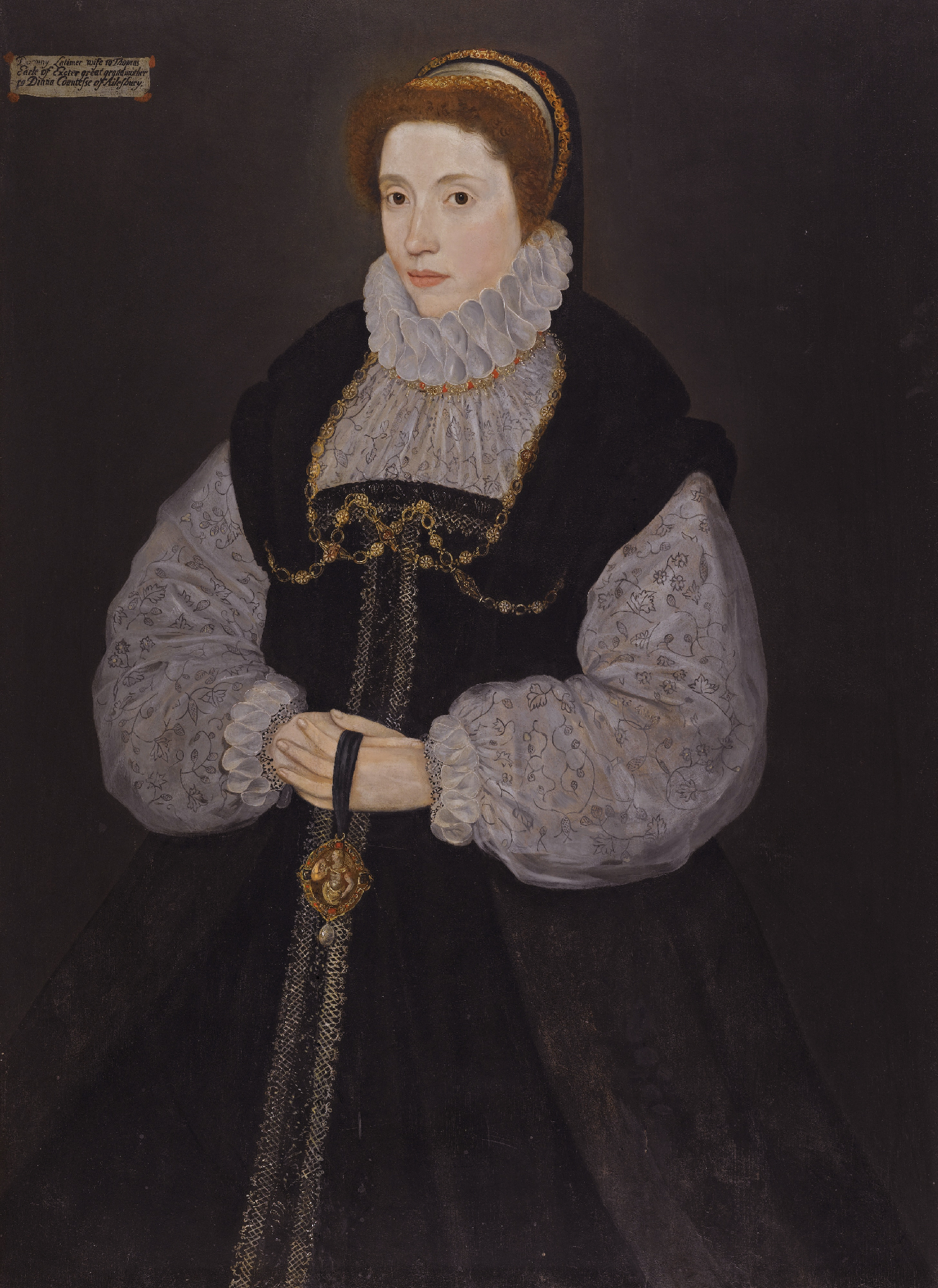
Dorothy, Countess of Exeter (1549–1608), Latimer's second daughter and first wife of Thomas Cecil, 1st Earl of Exeter

In 1545, Latimer married Lucy Somerset, the daughter of Henry Somerset, 2nd Earl of Worcester, by his second wife, Elizabeth Browne. His wife became a lady-in-waiting to her husband's former step-mother, Queen Katherine. They had four daughters:

- Katherine (1545–46 – 28 October 1596), who married firstly, Henry Percy, 8th Earl of Northumberland, and secondly, Francis Fitton of Binfield, Berkshire.
- Dorothy (1548–1609), who married Thomas Cecil, 1st Earl of Exeter.
- Lucy (c. 1549 – April 1608), who married Sir William Cornwallis (c. 1551 – 1611) of Brome, Suffolk.
- Elizabeth (c. 1550 – 1630), who married firstly Sir John Danvers (1540–1594) of Dauntsey, and secondly, Sir Edmund Carey. Her eldest son, Sir Charles Danvers (c. 1568 – 1601), was attainted and executed in 1601 for his part in the Essex rebellion.

All of their daughters' first marriages produced children.

== Footnotes ==
Peerage of England
Preceded by John Nevill	Baron Latimer; 1543–1577	In abeyance Title next held by Francis Money-Coutts
