= Elizabeth Somerset, Countess of Worcester (1502–1565) =

English noblewoman

The Right Honourable; The Countess Worcester
- Countess of Worcester
- Tenure: 1526—1565
- Born: Elizabeth Browne; 1502; Betchworth, Surrey, England
- Died: 1565 (aged 62–63)
- Spouse: Henry Somerset, 2nd Earl of Worcester
- Issue: 9, including Anne, William, and Lucy
- Parents: Anthony Browne; Lucy Neville
- Occupation: Lady-in-waiting to Anne Boleyn

Elizabeth Somerset, Countess of Worcester (née Browne; 1502–1565) was a lady-in-waiting to Anne Boleyn and the main informant against her.

== Early life ==
Elizabeth was the daughter of Sir Anthony Browne, a trusted courtier at the court of Henry VIII, and his wife, Lucy, a daughter of John Neville, 1st Marquess of Montagu and Isobel Ingaldesthorpe. She was also the halfsister of Sir William Fitzwilliam, 1st Earl of Southampton, treasurer of the household and a man who later became very active in the Boleyn inquiries led by her accusations against Queen Anne. In her mother's will, dated 1531, Elizabeth was left a pair of "bedys of gold with tenne gawdies."

About 1508, Elizabeth's sister, Anne Browne, married Sir Charles Brandon, later Duke of Suffolk. By that union, Elizabeth was aunt to Lady Anne Brandon, and her younger sister, Lady Mary Brandon.

She was the second wife of Henry Somerset, 2nd earl of Worcester, the son of Charles Somerset, 1st Earl of Worcester, and Elizabeth Somerset, Baroness Herbert. Henry's first wife, Lady Margaret, had died without issue. Elizabeth married Henry before 1527 and was officially deemed the Countess of Worcester on 15 April 1526.

Rumors that she was a mistress of Henry VIII very likely confuse her with another female member of the Browne family, possibly her niece. There is no record that she was the king's mistress.

== Connection to the Anne Boleyn investigation ==
Elizabeth served as one of Anne Boleyn's ladies in her privy chamber and was close to her. After Anne's coronation, a large feast was held. To the queen's right stood the countess of Oxford and to her left, Elizabeth Somerset. As her lady-in-waiting, Elizabeth's "duties included on several occasions during the dinner holding a fine cloth before the queen’s face when she wanted to spit." There is documentation that Elizabeth secretly borrowed £100 from Anne, suggesting the two were close. She had not repaid that debt by the time Anne was imprisoned in the Tower. There is also record of a payment made on 4 February 1530 by the king's personal purse to a midwife for the countess of Worcester, most likely Anne's doing. This closeness lent credibility to her accusations against the queen. G.W. Bernard, author of Anne Boleyn: Fatal Attractions explains that as Anne's lady in waiting, "she would have been aware of it, indeed might have been complicit" with any adulterous acts.

In 1536, she testified against Anne Boleyn, claiming she engaged in numerous adulterous acts with a handful of men including Henry Norris, Mark Smeaton, and George Boleyn, 2nd Viscount Rochford, the queen's brother. Her accusations are described in Lancelot de Carle's poem A letter containing the criminal charges laid against Queen Anne Boleyn of England. It exposes conflict between one of the king's privy counsellors and his sister whom he observes engaging in adulterous behaviour; ie. "the sister of one of the most strait-laced of the king’s counsellors". Once her brother warns her against appearing promiscuous, the sister of the counsellor announced she is not the worst sinner in regards to promiscuous behavior. "But you see a small fault in me, while overlooking a much higher fault that is much more damaging," the translated poem reads. She accuses Queen Anne of adultery and tells her brother to look to Mark Smeaton and the queen's own brother, George Boleyn. She claims, "I must not forget to tell you what seems to me to be the worst thing, which is that often her brother has carnal knowledge of her in bed." This accusation formed the basis of charges leading to Anne's demise, although many historical accounts concur that the charges involving incest between Anne and George are trumped-up. Elizabeth Somerset was identified as the privy counsellor's sister referenced in the poem after John Hussee, agent of the Lord Deputy of Calais and factotum of Lord Lisle declared "as to the queen’s accusers, my lady of Worcester is said to be the principal." He acknowledged there were a few other accusers—"Nan Cobham, with one maid more"—but referred to Elizabeth as "the first ground" when it came to raising charges against Anne.

Elizabeth was expecting another child in the spring of 1536 during the events of Anne's investigation. Queen Anne became concerned about her former lady-in-waiting's difficulties during pregnancy even as she remained locked up in the Tower. She "much lamented my lady of Worcester… because that her child did not stir in her body." Elizabeth gave birth to a daughter that year and named her Anne, perhaps in honor of Anne Boleyn.

== Personal life ==
Tomb of Elizabeth Somerset and her husband Henry Somerset, 2nd Earl of Worcester, in St. Mary's Priory Church, Chepstow.

Elizabeth, Countess of Worcester, attended the coronation of Elizabeth I on 15 January 1559. She wore a gown of silver tissue and robes which she later bequeathed to her daughter Anne.

Elizabeth died in 1565, between 20 April when her will was dated and 23 October when her will was probated. She is buried in St. Mary's Priory Church in Chepstow (Monmouthshire).

Elizabeth and Henry left behind four sons and four daughters on record who grew to adulthood, although it is rumored they had two more children who survived past infancy, bringing the total to ten:

1. Lady Anne Somerset, married Thomas Percy, 7th Earl of Northumberland (1536 - 1591/1596)
2. William Somerset, 3rd Earl of Worcester (1527 - 21 February 1589)
3. Lady Lucy Somerset, married John Neville, 4th Baron Latimer (died 23 February 1583)
4. Lady Eleanor Somerset, married 1) Sir Roger Vaughan and 2) Henry Johns (died 1584)
5. Thomas Somerset (died 1586)
6. Charles Somerset
7. Francis Somerset (died 10 September 1547, in battle)
8. Lady Joan or "Jane" Somerset, married Sir Edward Mansel (1535-16 October 1597)
9. Mary Somerset (died approximately 1578)

== Bibliography ==
- Bernard, G.W. (2010). Anne Boleyn: Fatal Attractions. New Haven Conn.: Yale University Press. ISBN 9780300162455.
- Ives, Eric (2004). The Life and Death of Anne Boleyn: 'The Most Happy'. Malden, Mass.: Blackwell. ISBN 9780631234791.
