= Francis Fitton =

English landowner and musician

Francis Fitton or Fytton (died 1608) was an English landowner and amateur musician.

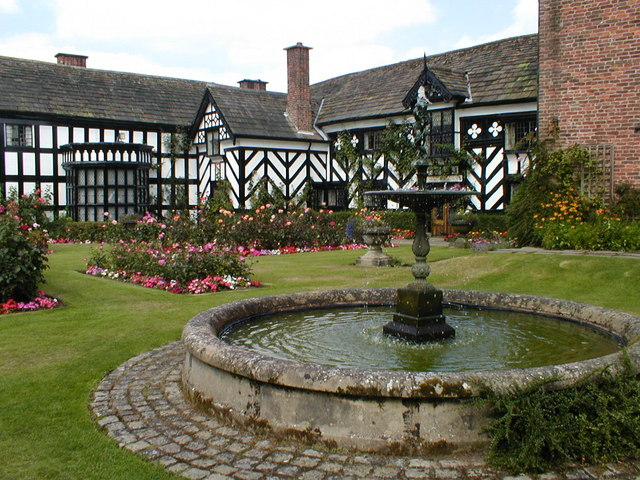
Gawsworth Old Hall

He was a younger son of Edward Fitton of Gawsworth, Cheshire, and Mary Harbottle, an heiress of Guiscard Harbottle of Horton and Beamish in Northumberland. His own estates were at Wadborough in Worcestershire (a Latimer property which had belonged to Katherine Parr), Binfield in Berkshire, and Heckfield, Hampshire, where he had a house called "Holleshotte".

In 1588 he married Katherine Nevill (died 1596), a daughter of John Neville, 4th Baron Latimer. She was the widow of Henry Percy, 8th Earl of Northumberland. Fitton was a relation of hers and had been her steward, and in 1587 her son, Henry Percy, 9th Earl of Northumberland, attacked him with a rapier in her London townhouse. Fitton continued to be involved the business affairs of his stepson. He leased his own manor of Nun Monkton in Yorkshire (another Latimer property) to the Earls's solicitor John Carvile.

At the Union of Crowns in 1603, James VI and I and Anne of Denmark travelled to London, and aristocrats and gentry were keen to meet them on the way. Fitton wrote to his great-niece Anne Newdigate (1574–1618) with news of a delay to the queen's journey, caused by her miscarriage at Stirling Castle, "the Queene hathe had lately some myshapp, (which is not to be spoken)". A great-nephew, Edward Fitton, joined the service of Anne of Denmark when George Carew became the queen's Vice-Chamberlain. Anne Newdigate's name was put forward as a nurse for the queen's daughter Princess Mary in 1605. She sent Francis Fitton lace that she had made and he called her "his owne sweete Nan".

Fitton died on 17 June 1608. He is commemorated with a two-stage monument depicting him in armour and as a decayed cadaver below at St James' Church, Gawsworth.

In his will, written in March 1608 when he was living at Gawsworth, he left a sapphire, a "clowdy lowpe saffer", which he used as medicine for the eyes to his sister Margaret (died 1612), wife of John Englefield (1562-1631), with the hangings and tapestries and furnishings including the virginals in his two chambers and dining chamber at Holleshotte. Fitton mentions a number of musical instruments, loaned and exchanged among family members, including sets of viols da gamba and recorders, a great gittern, and another pair of virginals. Some of the instruments were in his London lodging near the Savoy. Fitton had no children and left the diamond-studded gold star that he wore in his hat to his nephew, Edward Fitton, the younger. He called this jewel a "gimmal".
