= Thomas Percy, 7th Earl of Northumberland =

English nobleman and rebel leader

The Right Honorable The Earl of Northumberland KG
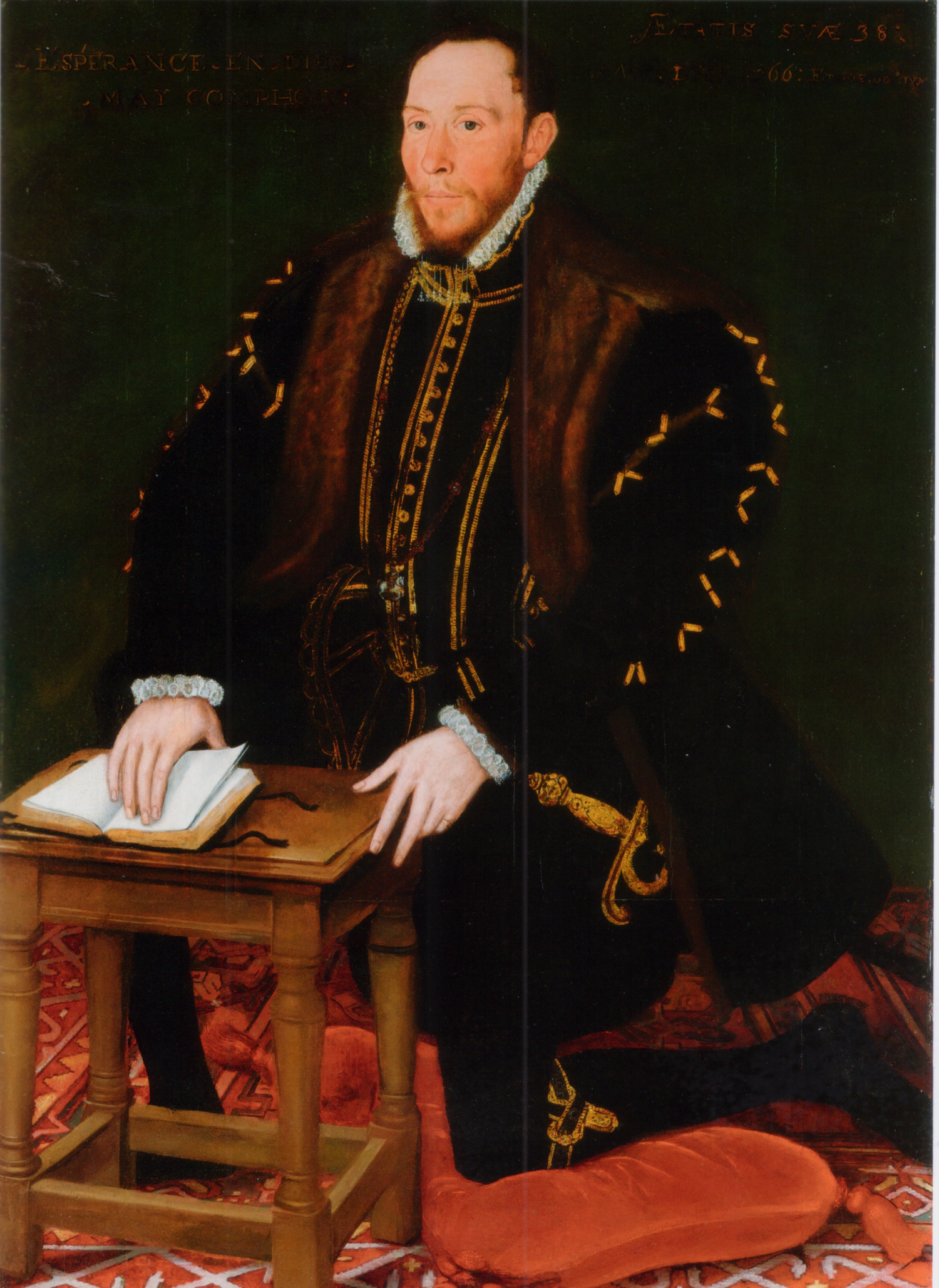
- Thomas Percy, Earl of Northumberland by Steven van der Meulen, 1566.
- Born: 1528
- Died: 22 August 1572 (aged 43–44); York, Kingdom of England
- Noble family: House of Percy
- Spouse: Anne Somerset
- Issue: Thomas Percy; Elizabeth Percy; Joan Percy; Lucy Percy; Mary Percy
- Father: Sir Thomas Percy
- Mother: Eleanor Harbottal

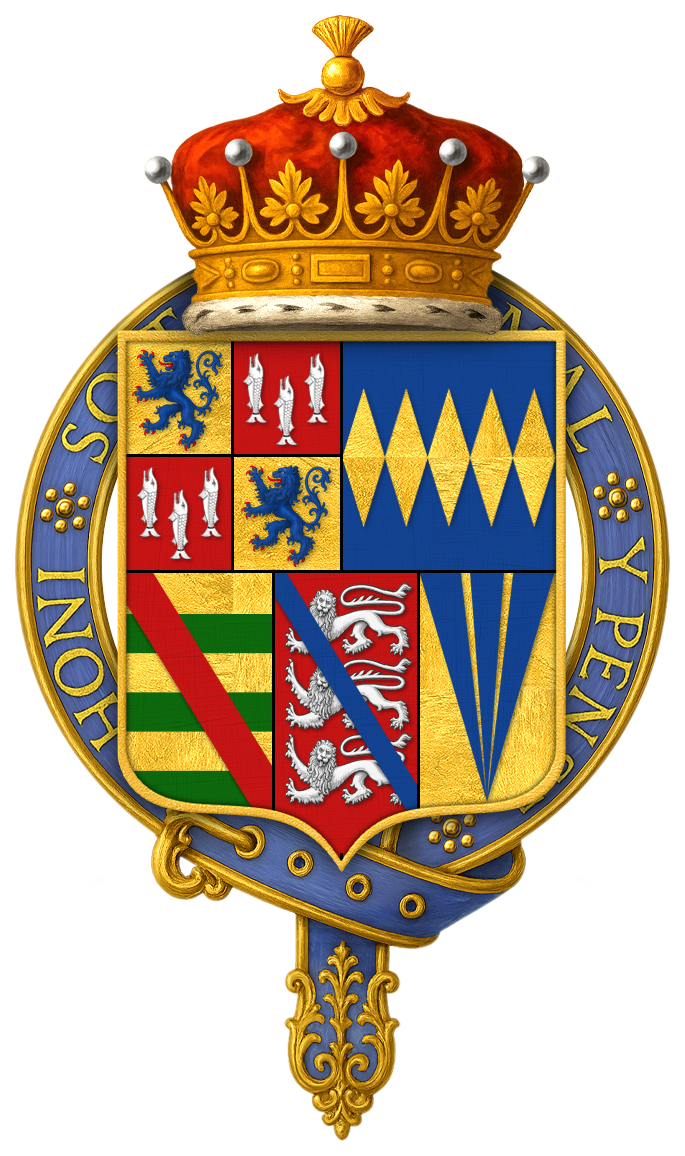
Quartered arms of Thomas Percy, 7th Earl of Northumberland, KG

Thomas Percy, 7th Earl of Northumberland, 1st Baron Percy, KG (1528 – 22 August 1572) was an English nobleman, politician and Roman Catholic rebel leader, who led the Rising of the North against Elizabeth I in 1569. After the failure of the rising, he was captured in Scotland, sold to the English government and executed for treason. He was later beatified by the Catholic Church.

== Early life ==
Blessed Thomas Percy

Martyr
- Born: c. 1528
- Died: 22 August 1572 (aged 43 - 44); York, Kingdom of England
- Honored in: Roman Catholic Church
- Beatified: 13 May 1895 by Pope Leo XIII
- Feast: 14 November (Diocese of Hexham and Newcastle), 22 August
- Attributes: Order of the Garter, Sword, Coat of arms of Percy family

Percy was the eldest son of Sir Thomas Percy and Eleanor, daughter of Sir Guiscard Harbottal. He was the nephew of Henry Percy, 6th Earl of Northumberland, with whom Anne Boleyn had a romantic association before she became the wife of King Henry VIII. When Thomas was eight years old his father, Sir Thomas Percy, was executed at Tyburn (2 June 1537) for having taken a leading part in the Pilgrimage of Grace, and he also is considered a martyr by many. Thomas and his brother Henry were then removed from their mother's keeping and entrusted to Sir Thomas Tempest.

In 1549, when Thomas Percy came of age, an Act was passed "for the restitution in blood of Mr. Thomas Percy". Shortly afterwards he was knighted, and, three years later, in Queen Mary I's reign, he regained his ancestral honours and lands. He was returned as Member of Parliament for Westmorland in the Parliament of England called in November 1554. Declared governor of Prudhoe Castle he besieged and took Scarborough Castle, which was seized by rebels in 1557. In reward he was granted the title of Earl of Northumberland and the Baronies of Percy, Poynings, Lucy, Bryan, and Fitzpane were restored to him, on 1 May 1557. He was installed at Whitehall with great pomp, and soon after was named Warden General of the Marches, in which capacity he fought and defeated the Scots.

== Life under Elizabeth's Reign ==
When the Catholic Queen Mary I died and her Protestant half-sister Elizabeth ascended to the throne as Elizabeth I, the Earl, whose Catholic faith was well known, stayed on to his northern estates while the first Elizabethan Parliament passed the first anti-Catholic measures. Despite this, Elizabeth continued to show Percy her favour and in 1563 made him a Knight of the Garter. He had then resigned the wardenship and was living in the South.

The systematic persecution of the Catholics rendered their position most difficult, and in the autumn of 1569 the Catholic gentry in the North, stirred up by rumours of the approaching excommunication of Elizabeth, were planning to liberate Mary, Queen of Scots, possibly with a view putting her on the English throne, and to obtain liberty of worship. Earl Thomas with the Earl of Westmorland wrote to the Pope asking for advice, but before their letter reached Rome circumstances hurried them into action against their better judgment. On 14 November 1569, they went from Brancepeth Castle to occupy Durham and held a Catholic mass.

=== Exile and rendition ===
After the Rising of the North failed, Thomas fled to Scotland, where he was captured by James Douglas, 4th Earl of Morton, one of the leading Scottish nobles. He was held at Lochleven Castle. Margaret Erskine wrote that her son, William Douglas, Laird of Lochleven, was at Loch Leven, "and it is all frozyn, quha (who) is at greitt charges by resoun of grett company in his houss daylie for the keiping of my Lord of Northumberland".

Elizabeth I sent Henry Gates and William Drury to ask Regent Moray to send the Earl to England. Moray was assassinated at Linlithgow in January 1570 before the negotiations were completed.

In January 1572, Thomas's wife Anne wrote from Mechelen to the Laird of Lochleven hoping in vain to secure his release. There were proposals that their allies would pay a ransom. where he was lodged in After three years, the Earl was sold to the English Government for two thousand pounds. He was taken to Eyemouth by the Laird of Cleish and then to Berwick-upon-Tweed, where he was lodged in Valentine Browne's house on 8 June 1572.

== Execution ==
The Earl was conducted to York and on 22 August 1572 was beheaded at a public execution on Pavement, refusing an offer to save his life by renouncing Catholicism. His headless body was buried at the now demolished St Crux Church, York.

== Marriage and children ==
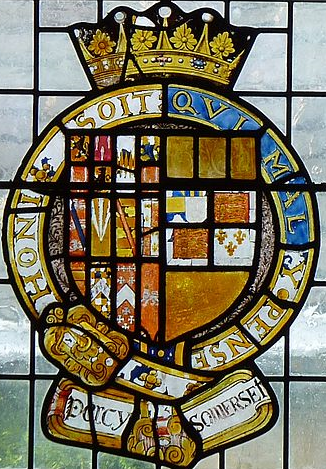
17th century stained glass escutcheon showing arms of Thomas Percy, 7th Earl of Northumberland (1528–1572), KG, (with 11 quarters) impaling Somerset (glass damaged/incomplete), paternal arms of his wife Anne Somerset, daughter of Henry Somerset, 2nd Earl of Worcester, the whole circumscribed by the Garter. Detail from Percy Window, Petworth House, Sussex

In 1558 he married Anne Somerset, daughter of Henry Somerset, 2nd Earl of Worcester. Their children included:

- Thomas Percy, Baron Percy (died 1560), predeceased his father.
- Elizabeth Percy, wife of Richard Woodroffe of Woolley, son of Francis Woodroffe.
- Joan Percy, wife of Lord Henry Seymour, a younger son of Edward Seymour, 1st Duke of Somerset by his wife Anne Stanhope.
- Lucy Percy, wife of Edward Stanley of Tong Castle, the son of Sir Thomas Stanley by his wife Margaret Vernon.
- Mary Percy (11 June 1570 – 1643), a nun, founder of Benedictine Dames in Brussels from which nearly all the existing houses of Benedictine nuns in England are descended.

== Succession ==
His wife survived him, as did four daughters who were his co-heirs. The baronies of Percy and of Poynings and the earldom of Northumberland of the older creation were forfeited, but owing to a clause in the patent the newer earldom of Northumberland and the other honours conferred in 1557 were not. As his only son had predeceased him without male issue, the earldom passed to his younger brother Henry Percy, 8th Earl of Northumberland.

== Beatification ==
He was beatified by Pope Leo XIII on 13 May 1895 and his feastday was appointed to be observed in the Diocese of Hexham and Newcastle annually on 14 November.

Peerage of England
New creation	Earl of Northumberland; 1557–1572 (Forfeit 1571) (Restored 1572)	Succeeded by Henry Percy
