= Charles Danvers =

English MP and soldier

Sir Charles Danvers (c. 1568 – 1601), was an English MP and soldier who plotted against Elizabeth I of England.

== Early life ==
He was born the eldest son of Sir John Danvers of Dauntsey, Wiltshire and Elizabeth, fourth daughter and coheiress of John Neville, Baron Latimer. He travelled abroad and then studied at Oxford University and the Inner Temple. He was elected as the MP for Cirencester in 1586 and 1589 and knighted in 1588.

== Conflict with Henry Long ==
On 4 October 1594 his younger brother, Henry Danvers, shot Henry Long, brother of Sir Walter Long, in the course of a local feud. According to their mother's version of events, her husband, Sir John Danvers, in his capacity as a justice of the peace, had learned of two robberies and a murder committed by the servants of Sir Walter Long. Sir Walter, his brothers and his followers had then turned against Danvers, and members of the Long faction had murdered one of Sir John Danvers' men and committed a number of other outrages. Letters were exchanged between members of the Danvers and Long families, and in a letter to Sir Charles Danvers, Henry Long threatened to whip him, and called him 'Asse, Puppie, ffoole & Boy'. Sir Charles and others sought out Henry Long at an inn, and cudgelled him, but found the door locked when they were ready to leave. Long drew his sword against Sir Charles, dangerously wounding him, and Sir Henry Danvers shot Long. The Danvers brothers fled to Titchfield, where their friend, Henry Wriothesley, 3rd Earl of Southampton, sheltered them. They were outlawed, and eventually escaped to the continent where they took refuge at the court of King Henri IV.

The disaster which had befallen his sons may have hastened the death of Sir John Danvers, who died only two months later, on 19 December 1594. In 1598 the widowed Lady Danvers married Sir Edmund Carey (c.1557-12 September 1637), son of Henry Carey, 1st Baron Hunsdon, a cousin of Queen Elizabeth. It was generally considered she did so in order to obtain a pardon for her sons. Other efforts were made on their behalf as well, and at the end of June 1598 Queen Elizabeth relented, and pardoned both the Danvers brothers on condition that they pay Sir Walter Long £1500 damages for the murder of his brother. On 30 August 1598 John Chamberlain noted that Sir Charles and Sir Henry Danvers had arrived in London.

== Later life and execution ==
In 1599, Charles went to Ireland as a member of one of the largest expeditionary forces ever sent to the country. He became a friend of its leader, the Earl of Essex. In February 1601 he took part in Essex' short-lived rebellion. He offered to pay £10,000 for his life, but to no avail. He was convicted of treason, and beheaded on Tower Hill for treason on 18 March 1601. Executed with him was his fellow conspirator, Sir Christopher Blount.
