= Henry Somerset, 2nd Earl of Worcester =

English nobleman

Henry Somerset
- Earl of Worcester
- Born: c. 1496
- Died: 26 November 1549 (aged 52–53)
- Noble family: Beaufort
- Spouses: Margaret Courtenay, Baroness Herbert; Elizabeth Browne
- Issue: William Somerset, 3rd Earl of Worcester; Francis Somerset; Charles Somerset; Thomas Somerset; Anne Somerset; Lucy Somerset; Eleanor Somerset; Joan Somerset
- Father: Charles Somerset, 1st Earl of Worcester
- Mother: Elizabeth Herbert, 3rd Baroness Herbert

Henry Somerset, 2nd Earl of Worcester (c. 1496 – 26 November 1549) was an English nobleman. He was the son of Charles Somerset, 1st Earl of Worcester and Elizabeth Herbert, 3rd Baroness Herbert. On his father's death on 15 April 1526, he succeeded as the second Earl of Worcester. From his mother, he inherited the title of Baron Herbert.

He was invested as a Knight on 1 November 1523 in Roye, France, by the Duke of Suffolk.

Somerset obtained Tintern Abbey after the Dissolution of the Monasteries.

== Family ==
He married twice:

- Firstly, by papal dispensation dated 15 June 1514, to Lady Margaret Courtenay, daughter of William Courtenay, 1st Earl of Devon, by Catherine of York, daughter of Edward IV, King of England. Margaret died before 15 April 1526. Some sources say the union produced no children.
- Secondly, before 1527, to Elizabeth Browne, daughter of Anthony Browne, Knt., by Lucy, daughter of John Neville, 1st Marquess of Montagu. Somerset died on 26 November 1549. The children of Henry Somerset and Elizabeth Browne were:
  - Lady Lucy Somerset (1524 – 23 February 1583) who married John Neville, 4th Baron Latimer.
  - William Somerset, 3rd Earl of Worcester (c. 1526/7 – 21 February 1589). Heir and successor of his father.
  - Francis Somerset (By 1532 – 22 July 1563), often erroneously said to have died at the battle of Pinkie in 1547, but fought at the siege of Leith in 1560, and was Member of Parliament for Monmouthshire, 1558. He was killed in an attack on Le Havre in 1563
  - Charles Somerset
  - Thomas Somerset.
  - Lady Anne Somerset (died 17 October 1596), married Thomas Percy, 7th Earl of Northumberland. Her husband was beheaded on 22 August 1572. They had four daughters and one son (died young).
  - Lady Eleanor Somerset, married Henry Johns
  - Lady Joan or "Jane" Somerset married Sir Edward Mansel.

== Family tree ==
Peerage family tree of the Dukes of Beaufort, Lancaster, and Somerset and subsidiary titles

Earl of Dorset (possible 1st creation), 1070
Roger de Beaumont c. 1015–1094 | Saint Osmund d. 1099; Bishop of Salisbury and possible Earl of Dorset
Earl of Dorset (1st creation) discontinued, 1099
Earl of Leicester (1st creation), 1107
King Henry I c. 1068–1135 | King Stephen; 1092/1096–1154 | Robert de Beaumont c. 1040/1050–1118; 1st Earl of Leicester | Henry de Beaumont d. 1119; 1st Earl of Warwick
Earl of Worcester (1st creation), 1138
Robert FitzRoy c. 1090–1147; 1st Earl of Gloucester | Matilda (d. bef. 1141) | Waleran de Beaumont; 1104–1166; Earl of Worcester | Robert de Beaumont; 1104–1168; 2nd Earl of Leicester | Hugh de Beaumont b. 1106; 1st Earl of Bedford
Earldom of Worcester (1st creation) extinct, 1166
William FitzRobert; 1116–1183; 2nd Earl of Gloucester | Hawise de Beaumont | Robert de Beaumont d. 1190; 3rd Earl of Leicester
Robert de Beaumont d. 1204; 4th Earl of Leicester | Amice; Countess of Rochefort
King John; 1166–1216 | Isabella; 1173/1174–1217; Countess of Gloucester | Simon de Montfort c. 1175–1218; 5th Earl of Leicester
King Henry III; 1207–1272 | Eleanor of England | Simon de Montfort c. 1208–1265; 6th Earl of Leicester
Earldom of Leicester (1st creation) forfeited, 1265
Earl of Leicester (2nd creation), 1267; Earl of Lancaster, 1276
King Edward I 1239–1307 | Edmund Crouchback; 1245–1296; 1st Earl of Leicester, 1st Earl of Lancaster
Earldom of Leicester (2nd creation) restored, 1324; Earldom of Lancaster restored, 1327
King Edward II; 1284–1327 | Thomas of Lancaster; 1278–1322; 2nd Earl of Leicester, 2nd Earl of Lancaster | Henry of Lancaster; 1281–1345; 3rd Earl of Leicester, 3rd Earl of Lancaster
Earldom of Leicester (2nd creation) and Earldom of Lancaster forfeited, 1322
Duke of Lancaster, 1351
King Edward III; 1312–1377 | Henry of Grosmont c. 1310–1361; Duke of Lancaster, 4th Earl of Lancaster, 4th Earl of Leicester | Joan of Lancaster c. 1312–1349 | John (II) de Mowbray; 1310–1361; 3rd Baron Mowbray | Eleanor of Lancaster; 1318–1372 | Mary of Lancaster c. 1320–1362
Earl of Worcester (2nd creation), 1397
John of Gaunt; 1340–1399; Duke of Lancaster, 5th Earl of Lancaster, (6th) Earl of Leicester jure uxoris Earl of Richmond | Blanche of Lancaster; 1342–1368; 5th Countess of Lancaster, (6th) Countess of Leicester | Maud of Lancaster; 1340–1362 a.k.a. Matilda, Countess of Hainault | William; 1330–1389; Duke of Bavaria and Count of Holland, (5th) Earl of Leicester jure uxoris | Richard Fitzalan; 1346–1397; Earl of Arundel | Thomas Percy; 1343–1403; Earl of Worcester
Earldom of Worcester (2nd creation) extinct, 1403
Roger La Warr; 1326–1370 | Eleanor Mowbray
Earl of Somerset (1st creation), 1397; Marquess of Somerset and Marquess of Dorset (1st creation), 1397 | Earl of Dorset (2nd creation), 1411
Henry Bolingbroke; 1367–1413; Duke of Lancaster, (7th) Earl of Leicester; King Henry IV | John Beaufort c. 1373–1410; Marquess of Somerset, Marquess of Dorset, 1st Earl of Somerset | Thomas Beaufort c. 1377–1426; Duke of Exeter, Earl of Dorset | Joan Beaufort c. 1379–1440 | Joan La Warr | Thomas West; 1365–1405; 1st Baron West | Joan de Beauchamp; 1375–1435
Earldom of Leicester (2nd creation) and Dukedom of Lancaster merged into the Crown, 1399 | Marquessate of Somerset and Marquessate of Dorset (1st creation) revoked, 1399 | Earldom of Dorset (2nd creation) extinct, 1426
Duke of Lancaster, 1399 | Earl of Worcester (3rd creation), 1421
Henry of Monmouth; 1386–1422; Duke of Lancaster; King Henry V | Reginald West; 1395–1450; 6th Baron De La Warr and 3rd Baron West | Richard Beauchamp (1394–c. 1422); Earl of Worcester
Dukedom of Lancaster merged into the Crown, 1413 | Earldom of Worcester (2nd creation) extinct, 1422
Duke of Somerset (1st creation), 1443 | Earl of Dorset (3rd creation), 1442; Marquess of Dorset (2nd creation), 1443; Duke of Somerset (2nd creation), 1448
Henry Beaufort; 1401–1418; 2nd Earl of Somerset | John Beaufort; 1404–1444; 1st Duke of Somerset, 3rd Earl of Somerset | Edmund Beaufort; 1406–1455; 2nd Duke of Somerset, 1st Marquess of Dorset, 4th Earl of Somerset, Earl of Dorset | Richard Neville; 1400–1460; Earl of Salisbury | Richard West; 1430–1476; 7th Baron De La Warr and 4th Baron West | Edward Neville d. 1476 de facto 3rd (de jure 1st) Baron Bergavenny | Elizabeth Beauchamp; 1415–1448
Dukedom of Somerset (1st creation) extinct, 1444
Claimed titles here are disputed | Earl of Worcester (4th creation), 1449
Margaret Beaufort; 1443–1509 | Elizabeth Woodville c. 1437–1492 | Henry Beaufort; 1436–1464; 3rd Duke of Somerset, 2nd Marquess of Dorset, 5th Earl of Dorset | Edmund Beaufort c. 1438–1471; 4th Duke of Somerset, 3rd Marquess of Dorset, 6th Earl of Dorset | Cecily Neville c. 1425–1450 | John Tiptoft; 1427–1470; 1st Earl of Worcester
Dukedom of Somerset (2nd creation), Marquessate of Dorset (2nd creation), and Earldom of Dorset attained, 1461, but possibly restored (disputed), 1463 | Dukedom of Somerset (2nd creation), Marquessate of Dorset (2nd creation), and Earldom of Dorset extinct, 1471 | Earldom of Worcester (4th creation) attainted, 1470
Thomas West c. 1457–1525; 8th Baron De La Warr and 5th Baron West
Marquess of Dorset (3rd creation), 1475 | Earl of Worcester (5th creation), 1514 | Earl of Worcester (4th creation) restored, 1471
Margery Wentworth c. 1478–1550 | King Henry VII; 1457–1509 | Elizabeth of York; 1466–1503 | Thomas Grey; 1451–1501; 1st Marquess of Dorset | Charles Somerset c. 1460–1526; 1st Earl of Worcester | Elizabeth Somerset c. 1476–1507; 3rd Baroness Herbert suo jure | Edward Tiptoft c. 1469–1485; 2nd Earl of Worcester | Eleanor West b. 1481 | Edward Guildford c. 1474–1534
Earldom of Worcester (4th creation) extinct, 1485
Viscount Beauchamp "of Hache" (1st creation), 1536; Earl of Hertford (2nd creation), 1537; Duke of Somerset (4th creation), 1547 | Duke of Somerset (3rd creation), 1499
Edward Seymour c. 1500–1552; Duke of Somerset, Earl of Hertford and Viscount Beauchamp | Jane Seymour c. 1508–1537 | King Henry VIII; 1491–1547 | Thomas Grey; 1477–1530; 2nd Marquess of Dorset | Henry Somerset c. 1495–1548; 2nd Earl of Worcester, 4th Baron Herbert | John Dudley; 1504–1553; Duke of Northumberland | Jane Guildford c. 1508/1509–1555 | Mary Tudor; 1496–1533; Queen of France; Duchess of Suffolk | Prince Edmund; 1499–1500; 1st Duke of Somerset
Dukedom of Somerset (4th creation), Earldom of Hertford (2nd creation), and Viscountcy Beauchamp (1st creation) forfeit, 1552 | Dukedom of Somerset (3rd creation) extinct, 1500
Duke of Richmond and Somerset, 1525
King Edward VI; 1537–1553 | Henry Fitzroy; 1519–1536; 1st Duke of Richmond and Somerset | Henry Grey; 1517–1554; Duke of Suffolk; 3rd Marquess of Dorset | Lady Frances Brandon; 1517–1559; Duchess of Suffolk
Dukedom of Richmond and Somerset extinct, 1536 | Marquessate of Dorset (3rd creation) attainted and honours forfeit, 1554
Earl of Hertford (3rd creation) and Viscount Beauchamp "of Hache" (2nd creation), 1559 | Earl of Leicester (3rd creation), 1564 | Baron Buckhurst (1st creation), 1567; Earl of Dorset (4th creation), 1604
Edward Seymour c. 1528–1593 | Edward Seymour; 1539–1621; 1st Earl of Hertford | Katherine Grey; 1540–1568 | William Somerset c. 1526–1589; 3rd Earl of Worcester, 5th Baron Herbert | John Dudley c. 1527–1554; Earl of Warwick | Robert Dudley; 1532–1588; 1st Earl of Leicester | Mary Dudley d. 1586 m. Henry Sidney | Lord Guildford Dudley c. 1535–1554 | Lady Jane Grey; 1537–1554; Disputed Queen of England | Thomas Sackville; 1536–1608; 1st Earl of Dorset, 1st Baron Buckhurst
Earldom of Hertford (3rd creation) forfeit, 1552 | Earldom of Leicester (3rd creation) extinct, 1588
Earl of Leicester (4th creation), 1618
Edward Seymour c. 1563–1613; 1st Baronet | Edward Seymour; 1561–1612; Viscount Beauchamp | Edward Somerset; 1553–1628; 4th Earl of Worcester, 6th Baron Herbert | Philip Sidney; 1554–1586 | Mary Sidney; 1561–1621 | Robert Sidney; 1563–1626; 1st Earl of Leicester | Robert Sackville; 1561–1609; 2nd Earl of Dorset, 2nd Baron Buckhurst
Marquess of Hertford (1st creation), 1641; Duke of Somerset (4th creation restored), 1660 | Baron Seymour of Trowbridge, 1641 | Marquess of Worcester, 1642 | Viscount Somerset of Cashel, 1626 | Viscount Rochester, 1611; Earl of Somerset (3rd creation), 1613
Edward Seymour c. 1580–1659; 2nd Baronet | William Seymour; 1588–1660; 2nd Duke of Somerset, 1st Marquess of Hertford, 2nd Earl of Hertford | Francis Seymour c. 1590–1664; 1st Lord Seymour of Trowbridge | Henry Somerset; 1577–1646; 1st Marquess of Worcester, 5th Earl of Worcester, 7th Baron Herbert | Thomas Somerset; 1579–1651; Viscount Somerset | Robert Sidney; 1595–1677; 2nd Earl of Leicester | Richard Sackville; 1589–1624; 3rd Earl of Dorset, 3rd Baron Buckhurst | Edward Sackville; 1591–1652; 4th Earl of Dorset, 4th Baron Buckhurst | Robert Carr c. 1587–1645; Earl of Somerset, Viscount Rochester
Viscountcy Somerset extinct, 1651 | Earldom of Somerset (3rd creation) and Viscountcy Rochester extinct, 1645
Edward Seymour; 1610–1688; 3rd Baronet | Henry Seymour c. 1626–1654; Lord Beauchamp | Charles Seymour c. 1621–1665; 2nd Lord Seymour of Trowbridge | Edward Somerset; 1601–1667; 2nd Marquess of Worcester, 6th Earl of Worcester, 8th Baron Herbert | Philip Sidney; 1619–1698; 3rd Earl of Leicester | Algernon Sidney; 1623–1683 | Lady Lucy Sidney; 1630–1685 | Henry Sidney; 1641–1704; Earl of Romney | Richard Sackville; 1522–1677; 5th Earl of Dorset, 5th Baron Buckhurst
Duke of Beaufort, 1682 | Baron Cranfield, of Cranfield, 1674; Earl of Middlesex (2nd creation), 1675
Edward Seymour; 1633–1708; 4th Baronet | William Seymour; 1650–1671; 3rd Duke of Somerset, 2nd Marquess of Hertford, 3rd Earl of Hertford | John Seymour c. 1646–1675; 4th Duke of Somerset, 3rd Marquess of Hertford, 4th Earl of Hertford | Francis Seymour; 1658–1678; 5th Duke of Somerset, 3rd Lord Seymour of Trowbridge | Charles Seymour; 1662–1748; 6th Duke of Somerset | Henry Somerset; 1629–1700; 1st Duke of Beaufort, 3rd Marquess of Worcester, 7th Earl of Worcester, 9th Baron Herbert | Robert Sidney; 1649–1702; 4th Earl of Leicester | Thomas Pelham; 1653–1712 | Charles Sackville; 1522–1677; 6th Earl of Dorset, 1st Earl of Middlesex, 6th Baron Buckhurst, 1st Baron Cranfield
Marquessate of Hertford (1st creation) extinct, 1675
Baron Conway of Ragley, 1703; Baron Conway of Killultagh, 1712 | Duke of Dorset, 1720
Edward Seymour; 1663–1740; 5th Baronet | Francis Seymour-Conway; 1679–1732; 1st Baron Conway | Edward Coke d. 1707 | Algernon Seymour; 1684–1750; 7th Duke of Somerset, Earl of Northumberland | Charles Somerset; 1660–1698 styled Marquess of Worcester | Philip Sidney; 1676–1705; 5th Earl of Leicester | John Sidney; 1680–1737; 6th Earl of Leicester | Jocelyn Sidney; 1682–1743; 7th Earl of Leicester | Elizabeth Pelham; 1681–1711 | Lionel Sackville; 1688–1765; 1st Duke of Dorset, 7th Earl of Dorset, 2nd Earl of Middlesex, 7th Baron Buckhurst, 2nd Baron Cranfield
Earldom of Leicester (4th creation) extinct, 1743
Baron Lovel, of Minster Lovel, 1728; Earl of Leicester (5th creation) and Viscount Coke, 1744
Edward Seymour; 1695–1757; 6th Baronet; 8th Duke of Somerset | Anne Coke | Thomas Coke; 1697–1759; Earl of Leicester, Viscount Coke, and Baron Lovel | Henry Somerset; 1684–1714; 2nd Duke of Beaufort, 4th Marquess of Worcester, 8th Earl of Worcester, 10th Baron Herbert | Charles Townshend; 1700–1764; 3rd Viscount Townshend
Earl of Hertford (4th creation) and Viscount Beauchamp (2nd creation), 1850; Marquess of Hertford (2nd creation) and Earl of Yarmouth (3rd creation), 1793 | Earldom of Leicester (5th creation) and subsidiary titles extinct, 1759 | Viscount Sackville and Baron Bolebrooke, 1782
Edward Seymour; 1717–1792; 9th Duke of Somerset | Webb Seymour; 1718–1793; 10th Duke of Somerset | Francis Seymour; 1726–1799 | Francis Seymour-Conway; 1718–1794; 1st Marquess of Hertford, Earl of Hertford, Earl of Yarmouth, and Viscount Beauchamp, 2nd Baron Conway | Wenman (Roberts) Coke c. 1717–1776 | Henry Somerset-Scudamore; 1707–1745; 3rd Duke of Beaufort, 5th Marquess of Worcester, 9th Earl of Worcester, 11th Baron Herbert | Charles Noel Somerset; 1709–1756; 4th Duke of Beaufort, 6th Marquess of Worcester, 10th Earl of Worcester, 12th Baron Herbert | George Townshend; 1724–1807; 1st Marquess Townshend | Charles Sackville; 1711–1769; 2nd Duke of Dorset, 8th Earl of Dorset, 3rd Earl of Middlesex, 8th Baron Buckhurst, 3rd Baron Cranfield | John Sackville; 1713–1765 | George Germain; 1716–1785; 1st Viscount Sackville, 1st Baron Bolebrooke
Earl of Leicester (7th creation), 1837 | Baron Botetourt abeyance terminated, 1803 | Earl of Leicester (6th creation), 1784
Francis Compton Seymour d. 1822 | Francis Ingram-Seymour-Conway; 1743–1822; 2nd Marquess of Hertford, Earl of Hertford, Earl of Yarmouth, and Viscount Beauchamp, 3rd Baron Conway | Hugh Seymour; 1759–1801 | Thomas William Coke; 1754–1842; 1st Earl of Leicester and Viscount Coke | Henry Somerset; 1744–1803; 5th Duke of Beaufort, 7th Marquess of Worcester, 11th Earl of Worcester, 13th Baron Herbert, 5th Baron Botetourt | George Townshend; 1753–1811; 2nd Marquess Townshend, 1st Earl of Leicester | John Frederick Sackville; 1745–1799; 3rd Duke of Dorset, 9th Earl of Dorset, 4th Earl of Middlesex, 9th Baron Buckhurst, 4th Baron Cranfield
Baron Raglan, 1852
Edward Adolphus St Maur; 1775–1855; 11th Duke of Somerset | Francis Charles Seymour-Conway; 1777–1842; 3rd Marquess of Hertford, Earl of Hertford, Earl of Yarmouth, and Viscount Beauchamp, 4th Baron Conway | George Seymour; 1787–1870 | Henry Charles Somerset; 1766–1835; 6th Duke of Beaufort, 8th Marquess of Worcester, 12th Earl of Worcester, 14th Baron Herbert, 6th Baron Botetourt | FitzRoy James Henry Somerset; 1788–1855; 1st Baron Raglan | George Townshend; 1778–1855; 3rd Marquess Townshend, 2nd Earl of Leicester | George John Frederick Sackville; 1793–1815; 4th Duke of Dorset, 10th Earl of Dorset, 5th Earl of Middlesex, 10th Baron Buckhurst, 5th Baron Cranfield | John Frederick Sackville; 1767–1843; 5th Duke of Dorset, 11th Earl of Dorset, 6th Earl of Middlesex, 2nd Viscount Sackville, 11th Baron Buckhurst, 6th Baron Cranfield, 2nd Baron Bolebrooke
Earldom of Leicester (6th creation) extinct, 1855 | Dukedom of Dorset, Earldoms of Dorset (4th creation) and Middlesex (2nd creation), Viscountcy of Sackville, Baronies of Buckhurst (1st creation), Cranfield, and Bolebrooke extinct, 1843
Francis Edward Seymour; 1788–1866 | Richard Seymour-Conway; 1800–1870; 4th Marquess of Hertford, Earl of Hertford, Earl of Yarmouth, and Viscount Beauchamp, 5th Baron Conway | Francis George Hugh Seymour; 1812–1884; 5th Marquess of Hertford, Earl of Hertford, Earl of Yarmouth, and Viscount Beauchamp, 6th Baron Conway | Henry Somerset; 1792–1853; 7th Duke of Beaufort, 9th Marquess of Worcester, 13th Earl of Worcester, 15th Baron Herbert, 8th Baron Botetourt
Earl St. Maur, 1863
Edward Adolphus St Maur; 1804–1885; 12th Duke of Somerset | Archibald Henry Algernon St Maur; 1810–1891; 13th Duke of Somerset | Algernon Percy Banks St Maur; 1813–1894; 14th Duke of Somerset | Francis Payne Seymour; 1815–1870 | Thomas William Coke; 1822–1909; 2nd Earl of Leicester and Viscount Coke | Henry Charles FitzRoy Somerset; 1824–1899; 8th Duke of Beaufort, 10th Marquess of Worcester, 14th Earl of Worcester, 16th Baron Herbert, 8th Baron Botetourt | Richard Henry FitzRoy Somerset; 1817–1884; 2nd Baron Raglan
Earldom St. Maur extinct, 1885
Edward Adolphus Ferdinand St. Maur; 1835–1869 | Algernon St Maur; 1846–1923; 15th Duke of Somerset | Edward Hamilton Seymour; 1860–1931; 16th Duke of Somerset | Hugh de Grey Seymour; 1843–1912; 6th Marquess of Hertford, Earl of Hertford, Earl of Yarmouth, and Viscount Beauchamp, 7th Baron Conway | Thomas William Coke; 1848–1941; 3rd Earl of Leicester and Viscount Coke | Henry Adelbert Wellington FitzRoy Somerset; 1847–1924; 9th Duke of Beaufort, 11th Marquess of Worcester, 15th Earl of Worcester, 17th Baron Herbert, 9th Baron Botetourt | Henry Richard Charles Somerset; 1849–1932 | George FitzRoy Henry Somerset; 1857–1921; 3rd Baron Raglan
Evelyn Francis Edward Seymour; 1882–1954; 17th Duke of Somerset | George Francis Alexander Seymour; 1871–1940; 7th Marquess of Hertford, Earl of Hertford, Earl of Yarmouth, and Viscount Beauchamp, 8th Baron Conway | Henry Charles Seymour; 1878–1939 | Thomas William Coke; 1880–1949; 4th Earl of Leicester and Viscount Coke | Arthur George Coke; 1882–1915 | Henry Charles Somers Augustus Somerset; 1874–1945 | FitzRoy Richard Somerset; 1885–1964; 4th Baron Raglan
Percy Hamilton Seymour; 1910–1984; 18th Duke of Somerset | Thomas William Edward Coke; 1908–1976; 5th Earl of Leicester and Viscount Coke | Anthony Louis Lovel Coke; 1909–1994; 6th Earl of Leicester and Viscount Coke | Henry Hugh Arthur FitzRoy Somerset; 1900–1984; 10th Duke of Beaufort, 12th Marquess of Worcester, 16th Earl of Worcester, 18th Baron Herbert, 10th Baron Botetourt | Henry Robert Somers FitzRoy de Vere Somerset; 1898–1965
Barony Botetourt abeyant, 1984
Hugh Edward Conway Seymour; 1930–1997; 8th Marquess of Hertford, Earl of Hertford, Earl of Yarmouth, and Viscount Beauchamp, 9th Baron Conway | Edward Douglas Coke; 1936–2015; 7th Earl of Leicester and Viscount Coke | David Robert Somerset; 1928–2017; 11th Duke of Beaufort, 13th Marquess of Worcester, 17th Earl of Worcester | FitzRoy John Somerset; 1927–2010; 5th Baron Raglan | Geoffrey Somerset; 1932–2025; 6th Baron Raglan
John Michael Edward Seymour b. 1952; 19th Duke of Somerset | Henry (Harry) Jocelyn Seymour b. 1958; 9th Marquess of Hertford, Earl of Hertford, Earl of Yarmouth, and Viscount Beauchamp, 10th Baron Conway | Thomas Edward Coke b. 1965; 8th Earl of Leicester and Viscount Coke | Henry John FitzRoy Somerset b. 1952; 12th Duke of Beaufort, 14th Marquess of Worcester, 18th Earl of Worcester | Arthur Geoffrey Somerset; 1960–2012
Sebastian Edward Seymour b. 1982 styled Lord Seymour | William Francis Seymour b. 1993 styled Earl of Yarmouth | Edward Horatio Coke b. 2003 styled Viscount Coke | Henry Robert FitzRoy Somerset b. 1989 styled Marquess of Worcester | Inigo Arthur Fitzroy Somerset; 7th Baron Raglan b. 2004 | Ivo Geoffrey Arthur Tarsus Somerset b. 2007
Heir apparent to the Dukedom of Somerset | Heir apparent to the Marquessate of Hertford | Heir apparent to the Earldom of Leicester | Heir apparent to the Dukedom of Beaufort | Heir presumptive to the Raglan Barony

== Ancestry ==
Ancestors of Henry Somerset, 2nd Earl of Worcester

8. Edmund Beaufort, 2nd Duke of Somerset
4. Henry Beaufort, 3rd Duke of Somerset
9. Eleanor Beauchamp
2. Charles Somerset, 1st Earl of Worcester
5. Joan Hill
1. Henry Somerset, 2nd Earl of Worcester
12. William Herbert, 1st Earl of Pembroke
6. William Herbert, 2nd Earl of Pembroke
13. Anne Devereux
3. Elizabeth Herbert, 3rd Baroness Herbert
14. Richard Woodville, 1st Earl Rivers
7. Mary Woodville
15. Jacquetta of Luxembourg

Peerage of England
| Preceded by Charles Somerset | Earl of Worcester; 5th creation 1526–1549 | Succeeded by William Somerset |
| Preceded by Elizabeth Herbert | Baron Herbert; 1513–1549 | Succeeded by William Somerset |
