= Anthony Browne (died 1506) =

English knight (died 1506)

Sir Anthony Browne
- Died: Before 17 November 1506
- Buried: Church of St Nicholas, Calais
- Spouses: Eleanor Ughtred (m. 1488, died); Lucy Neville (m. 1497)
- Issue: with Eleanor: Anne Browne; with Lucy: Sir Anthony Browne; Henry Browne; Elizabeth Browne; Lucy Browne

Sir Anthony Browne (died before 17 November 1506) was the son of Sir Thomas Browne and Eleanor FitzAlan. He served as Henry VII's standard-bearer and Lieutenant of Calais.

== Career ==
Anthony Browne was a younger son of Sir Thomas Browne and Eleanor FitzAlan, daughter of Thomas Fitzalan, third son of John de Arundel, 2nd Baron Arundel (d. 14 August 1390), and Elizabeth le Despenser (d. 10/11 April 1408). He was a younger brother of Sir George Browne.

During the reign of Henry VII, he was Standard Bearer of England, Governor of Queenborough Castle, and Constable of Calais. He was knighted at the Battle of Stoke Field on 16 June 1487.

== Wife's political activity ==
His second wife, Lucy Neville, was an unswerving supporter of the House of York. In the reign of Henry VII, Lucy was noted as one who "loves not the King", and was said to be actively promoting the rival claim to the throne of her cousin Edmund de la Pole, 3rd Duke of Suffolk. This, combined with her husband's possession of a crucial fortress, was a constant worry to supporters of Henry VII: John Flamank's report of a secret conversation between several officials in Calais in 1504, on the likely sequel, if the King should die, referred to the risk that she would seize Calais and hold it in Suffolk's name. The heavy fine imposed on her in 1507, although the pretext was her late husband's neglect of duty, was very likely a warning by the Crown not to meddle in politics. She appears to have heeded the warning and lived peacefully until her death in 1534.

== Marriages and issue ==
Sir Anthony Browne married firstly, after 20 January 1488 at St. Wilfrid's, York, Eleanor Ughtred, daughter of Sir Robert Ughtred (c. 1428 - c. 1487) of Kexby, North Yorkshire, and Katherine Eure, daughter of Sir William Eure, by whom he had an only daughter:

- Anne Browne, who married Charles Brandon, 1st Duke of Suffolk.

He married secondly, after 27 April 1497, Lucy Neville, widow of Sir Thomas Fitzwilliam of Aldwark, North Yorkshire, Yorkshire, and daughter of John Neville, 1st Marquess of Montagu, and Isabel Ingaldesthorpe, by whom he had two sons and two daughters:

- Sir Anthony Browne (1500–1548); a courtier to Henry VIII.
- Henry Browne.
- Elizabeth Browne, Countess of Worcester, who married, as his second wife, Henry Somerset, 2nd Earl of Worcester. She was the principal witness against Anne Boleyn, and there were rumours that she had been a mistress of Henry VIII.
- Lucy Browne, who married firstly John Cutts, and secondly Thomas Clifford.

== Death ==
He died shortly before 17 November 1506 and was buried beside his first wife in the Church of St Nicholas, Calais. His widow died at Bagshot, Surrey on 25 March 1534 and was buried at Bisham Priory, Berkshire.
