= Elizabeth Somerset, Baroness Herbert =

Elizabeth Herbert
- Baroness Herbert
- Born: c. 1476
- Died: 27 August 1507
- Spouse: Charles Somerset, 1st Earl of Worcester
- Issue: Henry Somerset, 2nd Earl of Worcester; Elizabeth Somerset
- Father: William Herbert, 2nd Earl of Pembroke
- Mother: Mary Woodville

Elizabeth Herbert, 3rd Baroness Herbert (c. 1476 – 27 August 1507) was the sole heir and daughter of William Herbert, 2nd Earl of Pembroke, and his first wife, Mary Woodville.

Her father died on 16 July 1491, and she inherited extensive lands in Wales. As her father had no sons, she succeeded to his barony, but could not succeed to the earldom, which was restricted to the male line. She was made a ward of King Henry VII of England, and married Charles Somerset, 1st Earl of Worcester on 2 June 1492. Their only son, Henry, was born in around 1496. In 1504, Somerset was created Baron Herbert.

Elizabeth died on 27 August 1507, and was buried in St George's Chapel, Windsor Castle. The following month, further estates, including the lease of Caldicot Castle, devolved on Elizabeth's husband on the death of her uncle, Sir Walter Herbert. The addition of Herbert's estate made Somerset the most powerful landowner in South Wales. He had married for a second time by 1511, and was made Earl of Worcester in 1514.

Peerage of England
Preceded by William Herbert	Baroness Herbert; 1490–1507	Succeeded by Henry Somerset
