= Archibald Hay, 13th Earl of Kinnoull =

Scottish peer & soldier (1855–1916)

The Right Honourable The Earl of Kinnoull
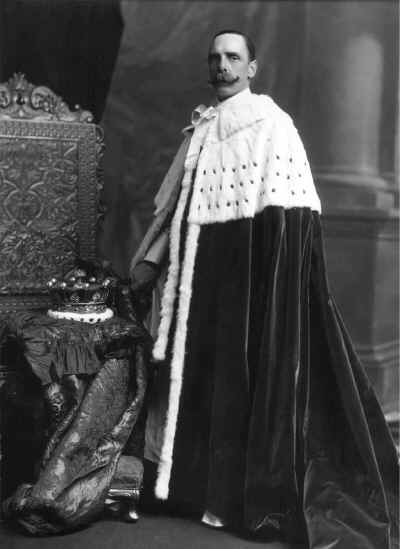
- Lord Kinnoull, on the coronation of Edward VII, 9 August 1902

Personal details
- Born: Archibald FitzRoy George Hay; 20 June 1855
- Died: 7 February 1916 (aged 60) Hove, England
- Spouses: Josephine Maria Hawke (m. 1877; sep. 1885) Florence Mary Darell (m. 1903; died 1916)
- Children: Edmund Hay, Viscount Dupplin; Lady Elizabeth Dent; Hon. Edward Hay; Hon. FitzRoy Hay; Lady Margaret D'Arcy
- Parent(s): George Hay-Drummond, 12th Earl of Kinnoull; Lady Emily Somerset

Archibald FitzRoy George Hay, 13th Earl of Kinnoull (20 June 1855 – 7 February 1916), styled Viscount Dupplin from 1886 until 1897, was a Scottish peer and soldier. His titles were Earl of Kinnoull, Viscount Dupplin and Lord Hay of Kinfauns in the Peerage of Scotland; and Baron Hay of Pedwardine in the Peerage of Great Britain.

== Early life ==
Hay was the third son of George Hay-Drummond, 12th Earl of Kinnoull and Lady Emily Somerset. Among his siblings were George Hay, styled Viscount Dupplin (who married Lady Agnes Duff, a daughter of the 5th Earl Fife), Lady Constance Hay (wife of cricketer Walter Hadow), Capt. Hon. Alistair Hay (who married Hon. Camilla Greville, a daughter of the 2nd Baron Greville), politician Hon. Claude Hay, and Lady Muriel Hay (wife of Prince Alexander Münster, a son of German ambassador to the United Kingdom, Georg Herbert zu Münster).

His paternal grandparents were Thomas Hay-Drummond, 11th Earl of Kinnoull and Louisa Burton Rowley (a daughter of Sir Charles Rowley, 1st Baronet). His maternal grandparents were Henry Somerset, 7th Duke of Beaufort and, his second wife, the former Emily Frances Smith (a daughter of Charles Culling Smith and Lady Anne Smith).

== Career ==
He was commissioned into the Royal Perthshire Militia in 1872 and later joined the Black Watch, with whom he fought in the 1882 Anglo-Egyptian War. He was awarded the Ottoman Order of Osmanieh. He served in Egypt as chief of staff to Baker Pasha; he also acted as colonel of the Egyptian Gendarmerie. He retired from the army in 1886, and succeeded to the title on the death of the 12th earl in 1897, his older brothers having died.

The Times noted that the musical earl was "of considerable talent—singing, playing, and composing—and on the occasion of his second marriage composed a hymn to be sung as the bride entered the church."

In the 1890s, he became involved with the Legitimist Jacobite League of Great Britain and Ireland, a part of the Neo-Jacobite Revival, along with Herbert Vivian and others. Vivian left the Jacobite League in August 1893,

He was also a collector; his china and furniture from Dupplin Castle fetched "good prices" when sold at auction at Christie's in May 1911. Later that year his library netted more than £2,700 (equivalent to £274,973 in 2025).

== Personal life ==
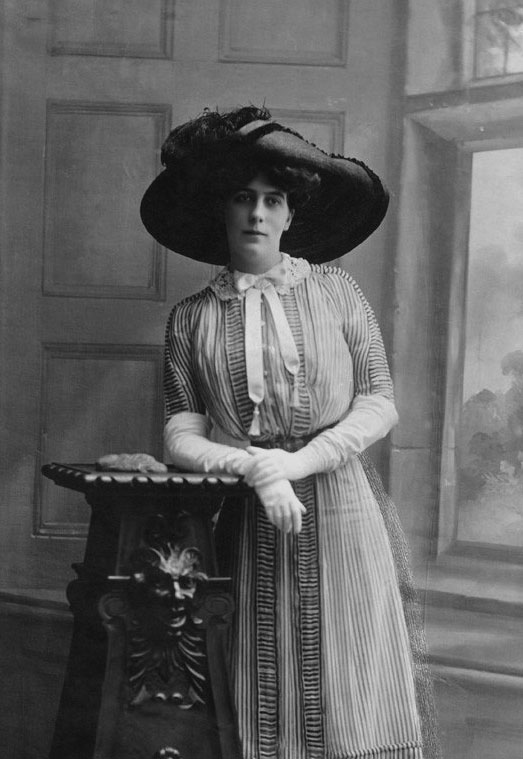
Photograph of his second wife, Florence Hay (née Darell), Countess of Kinnoull, 1910

In 1877, he married Josephine Maria Hawke (c. 1858–1900), a daughter of John M. Hawke of Hans Place, London. Before the couple separated in 1885, they had a son:

- Edmund Alfred Rollo George Hay, styled Viscount Dupplin (1879–1903), who married Gladys Luz Bacon, daughter of Anthony Harley Bacon, in 1901. She was a granddaughter of Maj.-Gen. Anthony Bacon and Lady Charlotte Harley.

The Countess of Kinnoull died on 2 December 1900.

After the death of his first wife, Lord Kinnoull re-married at St Paul's Church, Knightsbridge on 24 January 1903 Florence Mary (Molly) Darell. The youngest daughter of Edward Tierney Gilchrist Darell and Florence Johnson, she was a granddaughter of Sir William Darell, 4th Baronet. Together, they were the parents of two daughters and two stillborn sons:

- Lady Elizabeth Blanche Mary Gordon Hay (1903-1983), who married Peter Stanley Chappell, son of Thomas Stanley Chappell, in 1925. They divorced in 1935 (he later married Lady Eileen Knox, a daughter of the 5th Earl of Ranfurly) and she married Douglas William Ernest Gordon in 1935. They divorced in 1945 and she married William Herbert Shelley Dent, former husband of Mary Petre, suo jure 19th Baroness Furnivalle, and a son of Herbert Fullarton Dent, in 1945. They too divorced in 1945.
- Hon. Edward Hay (1906–1906), a twin who died in infancy.
- Hon. FitzRoy Hay (1906–1906), a twin who died in infancy.
- Lady Margaret Florence Grace Hay (b. 1907), who married Norman Francis William Haliburton D'Arcy, son of William Francis D'Arcy and Violet Nina Baring, in 1929. They divorced in 1942.

Lord Kinnoull died on 7 February 1916 at Hove. As his only son to survive infancy, Edmund, died of scarlet fever in 1903, predeceasing him, the earldom passed to his grandson, George. Three years after his death, his widow married Maj. John Joseph Berington, RMA (a son of Charles Michael Berington) on 26 May 1919. She died on 2 July 1941.

== Ancestors ==
Ancestors of Archibald Hay, 13th Earl of Kinnoull

16. Most Rev. Hon. Robert Hay-Drummond, Archbishop of York
8. Robert Hay-Drummond, 10th Earl of Kinnoull
17. Henrietta Auriol
4. Thomas Hay-Drummond, 11th Earl of Kinnoull
18. Hon. Thomas Harley (Lord Mayor of London)
9. Sarah Harley
19. Anne Bangham
2. George Hay-Drummond, 12th Earl of Kinnoull
20. Vice-Admiral Sir Joshua Rowley, 1st Baronet
10. Admiral Sir Charles Rowley, 1st Baronet
21. Sarah Burton
5. Louisa Burton Rowley
22. Admiral Sir Richard King, 1st Baronet
11. Elizabeth King
23. Susannah Margaretta Coker
1. Archibald Hay, 13th Earl of Kinnoull
24. Henry Somerset, 5th Duke of Beaufort
12. Henry Charles Somerset, 6th Duke of Beaufort
25. Elizabeth Boscawen
6. Henry Somerset, 7th Duke of Beaufort
26. Granville Leveson-Gower, 1st Marquess of Stafford
13. Lady Charlotte Sophia Leveson-Gower
27. Lady Susanna Stewart
3. Lady Emily Blanche Charlotte Somerset
28. Charles Smith (Governor of Madras)
14. Charles Culling Smith
29. Zabier Charlotte Law
7. Emily Frances Smith
30. Garret Wesley, 1st Earl of Mornington
15. Lady Anne Wesley
31. Hon. Anne Hill

Peerage of Scotland
Preceded by George Hay	Earl of Kinnoull; 1897–1916	Succeeded by George Hay
