= Henry Somerset, 9th Duke of Beaufort =

British peer (1847–1924)

His Grace The Duke of Beaufort JP DL
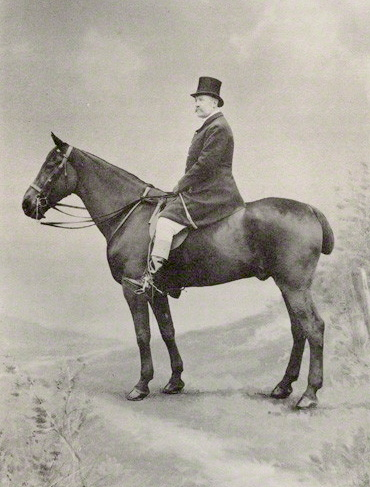
- Beaufort c. 1904
- Born: Lord Henry Adelbert Wellington FitzRoy Somerset; 19 May 1847; Berkeley Square, London, England
- Died: 24 November 1924 (aged 77); Badminton, Gloucestershire, England
- Noble family: Beaufort
- Spouse: Louise Emily Harford
- Issue: Lady Blanche Linnie Somerset; Lady Diana Maud Nina Somerset; Henry Somerset, 10th Duke of Beaufort
- Father: Henry Somerset, 8th Duke of Beaufort
- Mother: Lady Georgiana Charlotte Curzon

Captain Henry Adelbert Wellington FitzRoy Somerset, 9th Duke of Beaufort JP, DL (19 May 1847 – 24 November 1924), styled the Earl of Glamorgan until 1853 and Marquess of Worcester between 1853 and 1899, was a British peer.

== Background and education ==
Beaufort was born in Berkeley Square, London, the first surviving son and heir of Charles, Somerset, Marquess of Worcester and his wife, the Marchioness of Worcester (born Lady Georgiana Charlotte Curzon, daughter of Richard Curzon-Howe, 1st Earl Howe.

He was named after his godparents, his grandfather Henry, 7th Duke of Beaufort; Adelaide, Dowager Queen of the United Kingdom; and Arthur Wellesley, 1st Duke of Wellington.

In 1853, his father succeeded as the 8th Duke of Beaufort, at which point he was styled as the Marquess of Worcester. He was educated at Eton College between 1860 and 1864.

== Military service and public appointments ==
Beaufort became a cornet in 1865 in the Royal Horse Guards and was promoted to captain in 1869. He was aide-de-camp to Queen Victoria in 1899 and served as Lord High Steward of Bristol in 1899. On 8 January 1900 he was appointed a Deputy Lieutenant of Brecknockshire. He was Hereditary Keeper of Raglan Castle. He was appointed the Honorary Colonel of the Royal Gloucestershire Hussars. He was a Justice of the Peace for Monmouthshire and Gloucestershire and a Deputy Lieutenant of Gloucestershire and Monmouthshire.

== Family ==
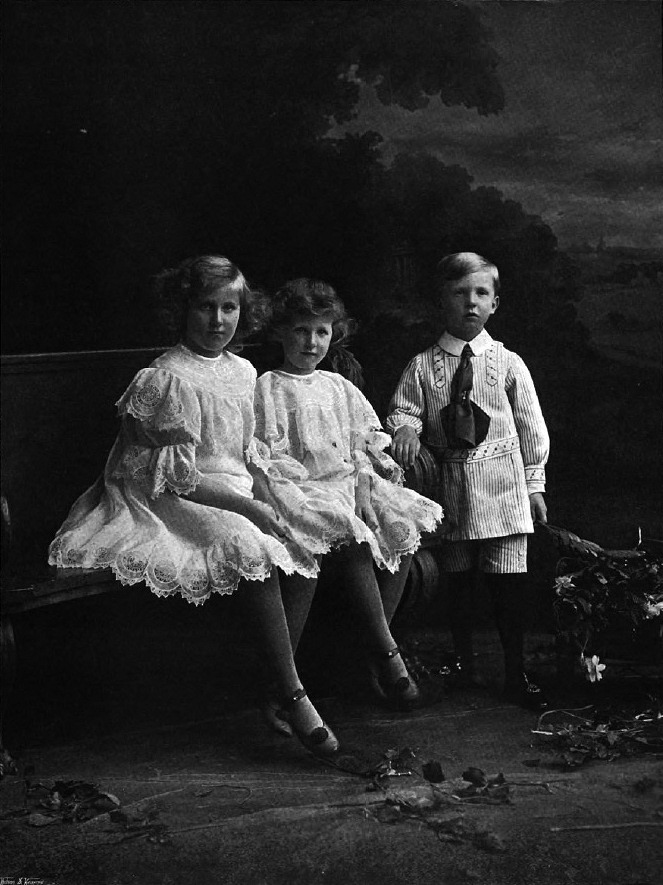
The Duke's three children in 1905

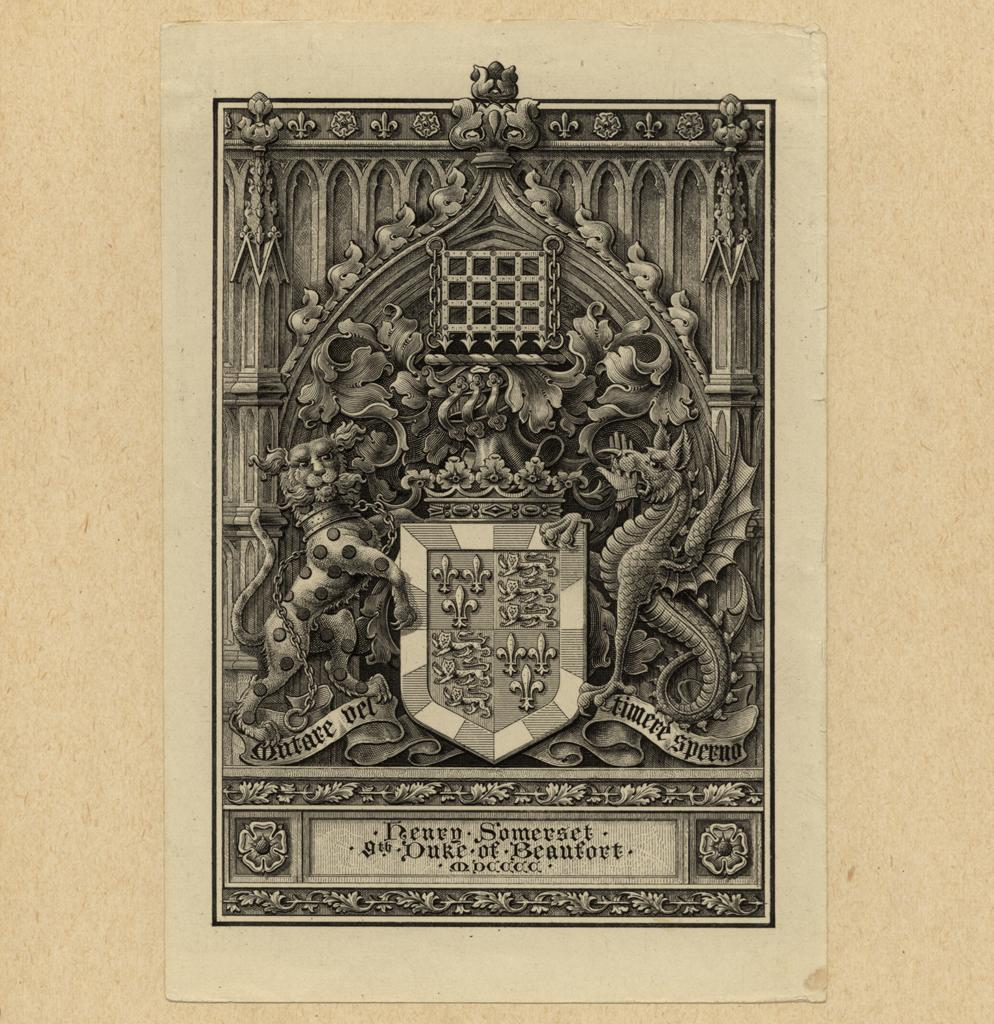
Bookplate with the Duke's arms

Beaufort married Louise Emily Harford (1864–1945), widow of a Dutch nobleman (Baron Charles Frederic van Tuyll van Serooskerken, 1859–1893, leaving two sons), on 9 October 1895. They had three children:

- Lady Blanche Linnie Somerset (1897–1968), married John Eliot, 6th Earl of St Germans (11 June 1890 – 31 March 1922), who died in a riding accident during a steeplechase, aged 31, leaving as issue two daughters. On 15 July 1924, she married George Francis Valentine Scott Douglas (14 February 1898 – 12 June 1930), who died from a polo injury. They had one son who died as the last of the Douglas baronets of Maxwell in 1969. Her descendants are the sole surviving descendants of the 9th Duke. Lady Blanche's eldest surviving grandson, David John Seyfried-Herbert, 19th Baron Herbert, eventually had the barony of Herbert called out of abeyance in his favour in 2002, after eighteen years.
- Lady Diana Maud Nina Somerset (12 September 1898 – 6 May 1935), married Captain Lindsey Shedden (1881–1971) on 19 September 1925, but had no known issue.
- Henry Hugh Arthur FitzRoy Somerset, 10th Duke of Beaufort (4 April 1900 – 5 February 1984), married Princess Mary of Teck. He left no issue and was succeeded by David Somerset, a first cousin twice removed.

The 9th Duke of Beaufort died in 1924, aged 77, at Badminton House, Gloucestershire. He is buried at St Michael and All Angels Church, Badminton.

== Ancestry ==
Ancestors of Henry Somerset, 9th Duke of Beaufort

16. Henry Somerset, 5th Duke of Beaufort
8. Henry Somerset, 6th Duke of Beaufort
17. Elizabeth Boscawen
4. Henry Somerset, 7th Duke of Beaufort
18. Granville Leveson-Gower, 1st Marquess of Stafford
9. Lady Charlotte Leveson-Gower
19. Lady Susannah Stewart
2. Henry Somerset, 8th Duke of Beaufort
20. Charles Smith
10. Charles Culling Smith
21. Zabier Law
5. Emily Culling Smith
22. Garret Wesley, 1st Earl of Mornington
11. Lady Anne Wesley
23. The Hon. Anne Hill-Trevor
1. Henry Somerset, 9th Duke of Beaufort
24. Assheton Curzon, 1st Viscount Curzon
12. The Hon. Penn Curzon
25. Esther Hanmer
6. Richard Curzon-Howe, 1st Earl Howe
26. Richard Howe, 1st Earl Howe
13. Sophia Howe, 2nd Baroness Howe
27. Mary Hartop
3. Lady Georgiana Curzon-Howe
28. The Hon. Robert Brudenell
14. Robert Brudenell, 6th Earl of Cardigan
29. Anne Bishopp
7. Lady Harriet Brudenell
30. George Cooke
15. Penelope Cooke
31. Penelope Bowyer

== Notes ==
Peerage of England
Preceded by Henry Charles FitzRoy Somerset	Duke of Beaufort; 1899–1924	Succeeded by Henry Hugh Arthur FitzRoy Somerset
