= Anne Wellesley =

Anne Wellesley may refer to:

- Anne Wellesley, Countess of Mornington (1742–1831), matriarch of the Wellesley family
- Lady Anne Culling Smith (1768–1844), born Anne Wesley
- Lady Charles Bentinck (1788–1875), born Anne Wellesley
- Anne Rhys, 7th Duchess of Ciudad Rodrigo, known as Lady Anne Wellesley from 1910 to 1933
