= George Hay-Drummond, 12th Earl of Kinnoull =

Scottish peer & cricketer (1827–1897)

The Right Honourable The Earl of Kinnoull JP DL
- Hay-Drummond coat of arms

Personal details
- Born: George Hay-Drummond; 16 July 1827 Mayfair, London
- Died: 30 January 1897 (aged 69) Newton Abbot, Devon
- Spouse: Lady Emily Somerset (m. 1848)
- Children: 9, including Archibald, Alistair, and Claude
- Parents: Thomas Robert Hay-Drummond, 11th Earl of Kinnoull; Louisa Burton Rowley

George Hay-Drummond, 12th Earl of Kinnoull (16 July 1827 – 30 January 1897), styled as Viscount Dupplin until 1866, was a Scottish peer and cricketer. His titles were Earl of Kinnoull, Viscount Dupplin and Lord Hay of Kinfauns in the Peerage of Scotland; and Baron Hay of Pedwardine in the Peerage of Great Britain.

== Biography ==
Kinnoull was born in 1827 at 51 Grosvenor Street, the eldest son of Thomas Robert Hay-Drummond, 11th Earl of Kinnoull, and Louisa Burton Rowley, daughter of Sir Charles Rowley, 1st Baronet.

He married Lady Emily Blanche Charlotte Somerset, daughter of Henry Somerset, 7th Duke of Beaufort, and Emily Frances (née Smith), on 20 July 1848. She, who was born 26 January 1828, died of bronchitis, 27 January 1895, at the Berkeley Hotel, Piccadilly, London, and was buried at Dupplin. He died on 30 January 1897, aged 69, at 'The Bungalow, Torquay, Devon. He was buried on the afternoon of Saturday, 6 February 1897, within the little private family burying ground in the gardens of Dupplin Castle.

He served as Justice of the Peace and Deputy Lieutenant of Perthshire.

== Family ==
The Earl and Countess had nine children:

- George Robert Hay, Viscount Dupplin (27 May 1849 – 10 March 1886), married Lady Agnes Duff, daughter of the 5th Earl Fife, and Lady Agnes Hay (daughter of the 18th Earl of Erroll); they had one daughter, Hon. Agnes Blanche Marie Hay
- Lady Constance Blanche Louisa Hay (15 August 1851 – 21 December 1931), married cricketer Walter Henry Hadow
- Hon. Francis George Hay (29 May 1853 – 11 September 1884)
- Archibald Hay, 13th Earl of Kinnoull (20 June 1855 – 7 February 1916)
- Lady Celia Evangeline Constance Hay (9 June 1857 – 18 May 1868)
- Capt. Hon. Alistair George Hay (18 April 1861 – 15 April 1929), married Hon. Violet Greville, daughter of the 2nd Baron Greville and Lady Violet Graham (daughter of the 4th Duke of Montrose)
- Hon. Claude George Drummond Hay (24 June 1862 – 24 October 1920)
- Lady Muriel Henrietta Constance Hay (14 August 1863 – 2 January 1927), married Count Alexander zu Münster
- Lady Magdalen Constance Mary Hay (b. 15 December 1866)

== Ancestors ==
Ancestors of George Hay-Drummond, 12th Earl of Kinnoull

16. George Hay, 8th Earl of Kinnoull
8. Robert Hay-Drummond, Archbishop of York
17. Abigail Harley
4. Robert Hay-Drummond, 10th Earl of Kinnoull
18. Peter Auriol
9. Henrietta Auriol
2. Thomas Hay-Drummond, 11th Earl of Kinnoull
20. Edward Harley, 3rd Earl of Oxford and Earl Mortimer
10. Hon. Thomas Harley (Lord Mayor of London)
21. Martha Morgan
5. Sarah Harley
22. Edward Bangham
11. Anne Bangham
1. George Hay-Drummond, 12th Earl of Kinnoull
24. Admiral of the Fleet Sir William Rowley
12. Vice-Admiral Sir Joshua Rowley, 1st Baronet
25. Arabella Dawson
6. Admiral Sir Charles Rowley, 1st Baronet
26. Bartholomew Burton (Governor of the Bank of England)
13. Sarah Burton
27. Philadelphia Herne
3. Louisa Burton Rowley
28. Curtis King
14. Admiral Sir Richard King, 1st Baronet
29. Mary Barnett
7. Elizabeth King
30. William Coker
15. Susannah Margaretta Coker
31. Susanna Saintlo

Peerage of Scotland
Preceded by Thomas Hay-Drummond	Earl of Kinnoull; 1866 – 1897	Succeeded by Archibald Hay
