= Joseph Ashe =

Joseph Ashe may refer to:

- Sir Joseph Ashe, 1st Baronet (1618–1686), English MP for Downton
- Joseph Ashe (English politician) (c. 1684–1725), English MP for Chippenham
- Joseph Ashe (Irish politician) (1717–c. 1760), Irish MP for Trim
