= Portrait of Elizabeth Kerr =

Painting by Joshua Reynolds

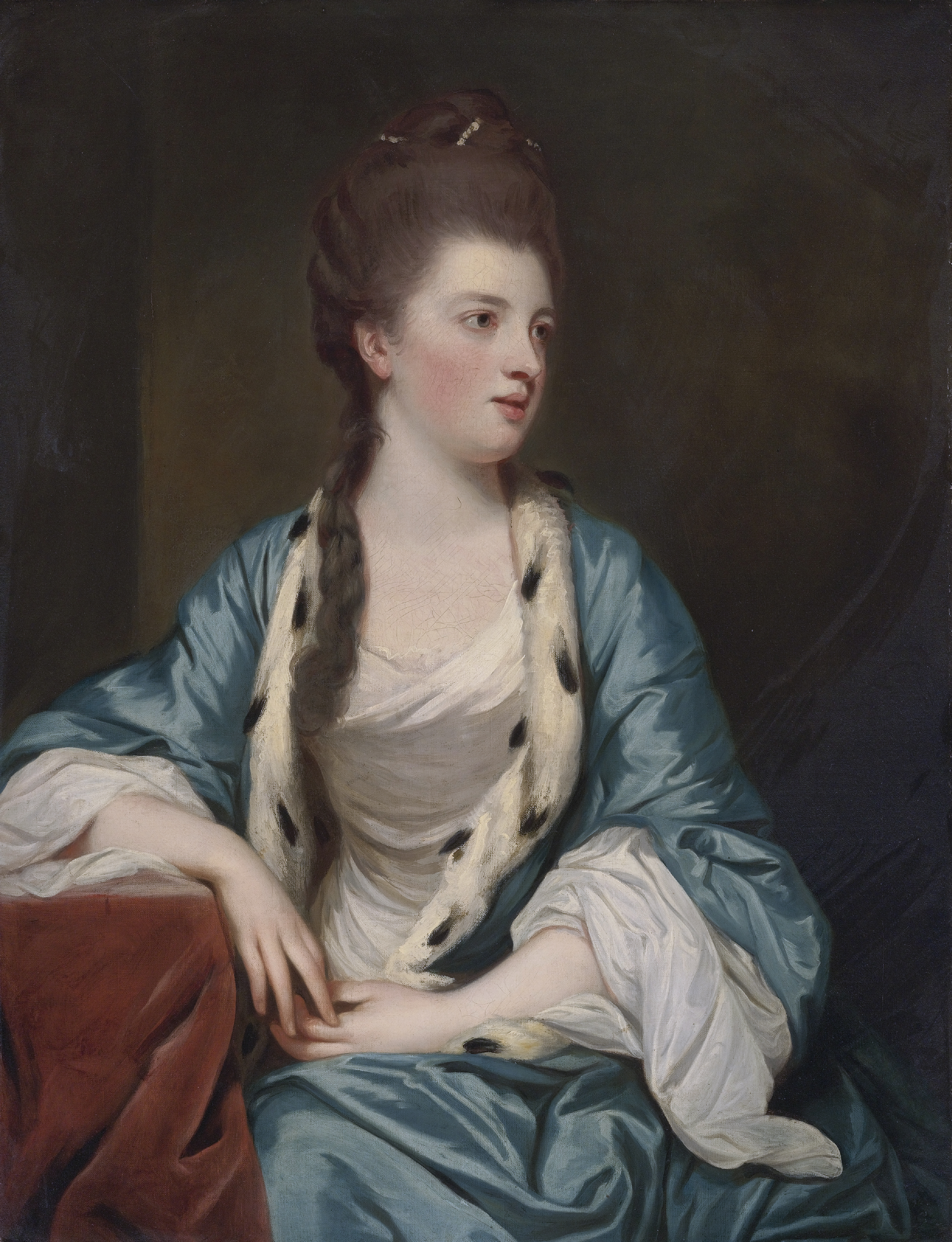
- Artist: Joshua Reynolds
- Year: c.1769
- Medium: Oil on canvas
- Dimensions: 97.7 cm × 74.4 cm (38.5 in × 29.3 in)
- Location: Museo Soumaya, Mexico City

Portrait of Elizabeth Kerr is a c. 1769 oil on canvas portrait painting by the English artist Joshua Reynolds. It is now in the Museo Soumaya in Mexico City.

It shows Elizabeth Kerr (née Fortescue), daughter of Chichester Fortescue (1718–1757), High Sheriff of County Down, Ireland. Reynolds also painted her at least twice between her marriage in 1762 and her husband's succession to the marquisate in 1775 – these half-lengths are on show at Blickling Hall and Fyvie Castle. John Spilsbury engraved the c.1769 work in 1770, though he altered a few details of the dress.

The c. 1769 work was inherited by William and Elizabeth's seventh child and second son Lord Charles Beauchamp Kerr (1775–1816), who passed it to his own son Captain Beauchamp Kerr. Sometime before 1899 it came into the hands of one E. Beckett, who sold it to Agnew's that year. Agnew's sold it on four days later to George J. Gould, who bequeathed it to a private collector in Washington, D.C. That private collector then sold it at auction at Sotheby's New York on 9 June 2011, where it was bought by its present owner for $62,500 (then equivalent to £38,514).

== Description ==
The subject is shown seated three-quarter-length, her hands resting in her lap and her right forearm resting on a table. She wears a dress influenced by the ancient Greek chiton and an overmantle of blueish silk, edged with ermine to reflect her noble status. Influenced by ancient Roman busts, her high and heavily-ornamented hairstyle was very fashionable for the time, with a single braid running over her right breast. Reynolds contrasts her white skin with a darker background Some art historians argue that the work complies with the "four principles of painting" outlined by Reynolds in his Discourses on Art, namely invention, colour, drapery and expression.
