= Charles Somerset, 8th Duke of Beaufort =

British politician (1824–1899)

His Grace The Duke of Beaufort KG PC
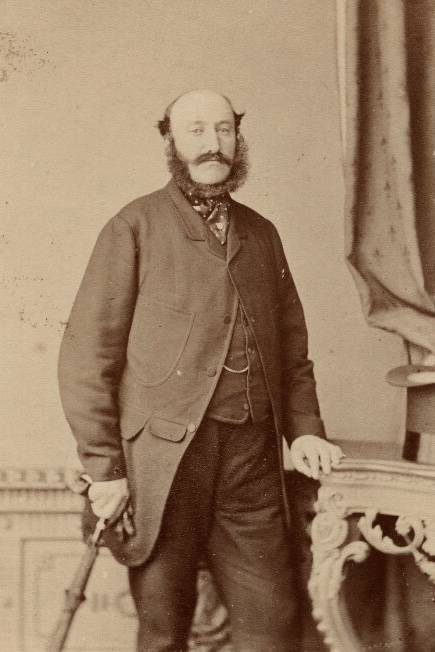
- The Duke of Beaufort, c. 1865–1875

Master of the Horse
- In office 26 February 1858 – 11 June 1859
- Monarch: Victoria
- Prime Minister: The Earl of Derby
- Preceded by: The Duke of Wellington
- Succeeded by: The Marquess of Ailesbury
- In office June 1866 – 1 December 1868
- Monarch: Victoria
- Prime Minister: The Earl of Derby; Benjamin Disraeli
- Preceded by: The Marquess of Ailesbury
- Succeeded by: The Marquess of Ailesbury

Personal details
- Born: 1 February 1824 Paris, France
- Died: 30 April 1899 (aged 75) Stoke Gifford, Gloucestershire, England
- Party: Conservative
- Spouse: Lady Georgiana Curzon (1825–1906)
- Children: 6, including Henry Adelbert, Henry Richard, and Henry Arthur
- Parent(s): Henry Somerset, 7th Duke of Beaufort; Emily Culling Smith

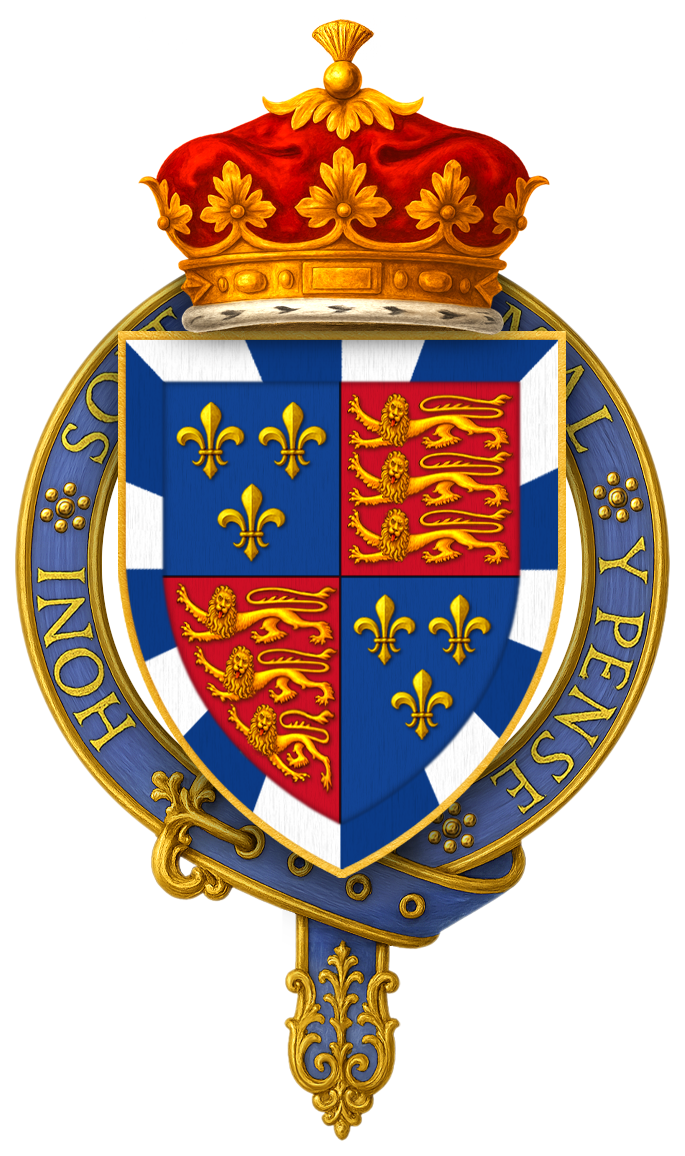
Garter-encircled arms of Charles Somerset, 8th Duke of Beaufort, KG

Henry Charles FitzRoy Somerset, 8th Duke of Beaufort (1 February 1824 – 30 April 1899), styled Earl of Glamorgan until 1835 and Marquess of Worcester from 1835 to 1853, was a British peer, soldier, and Conservative politician. He served as Master of the Horse, Member of Parliament for East Gloucestershire, and Lord Lieutenant of Monmouthshire.

== Background and education ==
Born in Paris, Beaufort was the only son of Henry Somerset, 7th Duke of Beaufort by his second wife Emily Frances (1800–1889), daughter of Charles Culling Smith and his wife Lady Anne Wellesley (the sister of Arthur Wellesley, 1st Duke of Wellington). He was educated at Eton College.

Throughout his life he was known as 'Charles Beaufort' to distinguish him from his father; his sons, all given the first name Henry, also went by their middle names.

== Military career ==
Beaufort was commissioned a Cornet and Sublieutenant in the 1st Life Guards on 17 August 1841. From 1842 to 1852, he was an aide-de-camp to the Duke of Wellington, then Commander-in-Chief of the Forces (Beaufort's father had also been Wellington's aide-de-camp during the Peninsular War). He was promoted lieutenant on 7 July 1843. On 13 August 1847, he purchased a captaincy in the 7th Hussars.

On 15 June 1852, Beaufort was appointed a deputy lieutenant of Gloucestershire, and after the death of Wellington in September, he continued to serve as aide-de-camp to the new Commander-in-Chief, Viscount Hardinge, until the latter's death in 1856.

On 21 April 1854, Beaufort purchased a commission as an unattached major, and on 5 May, he was appointed Lieutenant-Colonel Commandant of the Royal Gloucestershire Yeomanry, replacing his late father. During this time it was proposed to start "a cattle show" in Monmouth, and in 1857 Beaufort and John Etherington Welch Rolls each put money into a fund to start the show. Rolls was the greater financial contributor and he became President of the show. This cattle show is now known as the Monmouthshire Show.

Beaufort was breveted lieutenant colonel on 26 October 1858, but sold his commission and left the Army on 11 June 1861. On 16 September 1863, he was made a deputy lieutenant of Monmouthshire. He was also appointed Honorary Colonel of the 1st Gloucestershire Engineer Volunteer Corps on 20 November 1867. On 29 April 1874, he resigned the lieutenant-colonelcy of the Gloucestershire Yeomanry and became Honorary Colonel of the regiment. He resigned that commission on 2 July 1887. He also resigned the honorary colonelcy of the 1st Gloucestershire Engineer Volunteers on 2 December 1888.

== Political career ==
In 1846, Beaufort was returned as a Member of Parliament (MP) for East Gloucestershire, holding the seat until succeeding his father in the dukedom in November 1853. He was appointed Master of the Horse on 26 February 1858, as part of Lord Derby's second government and was made a Privy Counsellor the same day. He left office in 1859, when Derby's ministry fell. Beaufort was again appointed Master of the Horse in Derby's third government in 1866. On 19 March 1867, he was made a Knight of the Garter and appointed Lord Lieutenant of Monmouthshire later that year. He lost the Mastership of the Horse in 1868 when the government fell, but remained Lord Lieutenant for the remainder of his life.

Beaufort conceived and planned the Badminton Library series of sporting books, the publication of which began in 1885 with a volume on Hunting, and acted as its overseeing editor.

== Family ==
Beaufort married Lady Georgiana Charlotte Curzon (29 September 1825 – 14 May 1906), daughter of Richard Curzon-Howe, 1st Earl Howe, on 3 July 1845. They had eight children:

- Henry Arthur Fitzroy Somerset, Earl of Glamorgan (born and died 28 May 1846), survived only two hours after a difficult labour
- Henry Adelbert Wellington FitzRoy Somerset, 9th Duke of Beaufort (1847–1924); married Louise Emily Harford and had issue.
- Lord Henry Richard Charles Somerset (1849–1932); married Lady Isabella Caroline Cocks and had issue.
- Major Lord Henry Arthur George Somerset (1851–1926); died unmarried.
- Major Lord (Henry) Edward Brudenell Somerset (1853–1897); married Fanny Julia Dixie, daughter of Sir Alexander Dixie, 10th Baronet, and had issue.
- Lord (Henry) FitzRoy Francis Somerset (9 February 1855 – 23 July 1881), died aged 26, suddenly, of a heart attack while playing cricket near Tetbury, Gloucestershire
- Lady Blanche Elizabeth Adelaide Somerset (26 March 1856 – 1897); married John Beresford, 5th Marquess of Waterford and had issue.

Somerset died in 1899, aged 75 at Stoke Gifford, Gloucestershire, from gout and was buried on 5 May 1899 at St Michael and All Angels Church, Badminton.

He owned 51,000 acres, mostly in the counties of Monmouth and Gloucester.

- Emily Rowland (1841 - 1907) ; Henry Charles Somersets "spouse". They had two children, Jesse Thomas Rowland ( 1866 - 1950 ) and Elizabeth Jane Rowland ( 1860 - 1931 ). They split up not long after they had the two children and Henry cut ties with the children. Emily Frances Culling Smith were Jesse's and Elizabeth's grandmother (paternal) and gave them a monthly allowance ≈£300 as she didn't cut ties with them.

== Ancestry ==
Ancestors of Charles Somerset, 8th Duke of Beaufort

8. Henry Somerset, 5th Duke of Beaufort
4. Henry Charles Somerset, 6th Duke of Beaufort
9. Elizabeth Boscawen
2. Henry Somerset, 7th Duke of Beaufort
10. Granville Leveson-Gower, 1st Marquess of Stafford
5. Lady Charlotte Sophia Leveson-Gower
11. Lady Susanna Stewart
1. Henry Somerset, 8th Duke of Beaufort
12. Charles Smith
6. Charles Culling Smith
13. Zabier Law
3. Emily Frances Smith
14. Garret Wesley, 1st Earl of Mornington
7. Lady Anne Wesley
15. The Hon. Anne Hill-Trevor

Parliament of the United Kingdom
Preceded by Sir Christopher Codrington; Hon. Francis Charteris	Member of Parliament for East Gloucestershire; 1846–1853; With: Sir Christopher Codrington	Succeeded by Sir Christopher Codrington; Sir Michael Hicks Beach, Bt
Political offices
Preceded by The Duke of Wellington	Master of the Horse; 1858–1859	Succeeded by The Marquess of Ailesbury
Preceded by The Marquess of Ailesbury	Master of the Horse; 1866–1868	Succeeded by The Marquess of Ailesbury
Honorary titles
Preceded by The Lord Llanover	Lord Lieutenant of Monmouthshire; 1867–1899	Succeeded by The Lord Tredegar
Peerage of England
Preceded by Henry Somerset	Duke of Beaufort; 1853–1899	Succeeded by Henry Somerset
