= Georgiana Somerset, Marchioness of Worcester =

Georgiana Frederica FitzRoy
- Marchioness of Worcester
- Born: Georgiana FitzRoy; 3 October 1792
- Died: 11 May 1821; Apsley House, London
- Spouse(s): Henry Somerset, Marquess of Worcester (m. 1814; died 1821)
- Issue: Lady Charlotte Augusta Frederica Somerset; Lady Georgiana Charlotte Anne Somerset; Lady Anne Harriet Charlotte Somerset
- Father: Hon. Henry FitzRoy
- Mother: Lady Anne Wellesley

Georgiana Somerset, Marchioness of Worcester (née FitzRoy; 3 October 1792 – 11 May 1821), formerly Georgiana Frederica Fitzroy, was the first wife of Henry Somerset, 7th Duke of Beaufort, but died prior to his inheriting the dukedom.

== Early life ==
Georgiana was a daughter of the Hon. Henry FitzRoy, a son of Lord Southampton, and his wife, Lady Anne Wellesley, a sister of Arthur Wellesley, 1st Duke of Wellington. Following the death of Georgiana's father, her mother married Charles Culling Smith and had a daughter and a son.

== Personal life ==
Georgiana was a friend of Princess Charlotte of Wales (died 1817), the daughter of the Prince of Wales (the future King George IV of the United Kingdom), and her engagement to Somerset, the future duke of Beaufort, was announced at a ball given by the prince at Carlton House. They married on 25 July 1814, when he was known as Marquess of Worcester. He had been a junior officer under her uncle, the Duke of Wellington, who gave Georgiana away at the wedding. The following week, the marquess's uncle, Lord FitzRoy Somerset, married another of Wellington's nieces, Lady Emily Harriet Wellesley-Pole; she was also given away by the duke.

Before her death on in 1821, they were the parents of three daughters:

- Lady Charlotte Augusta Frederica Somerset (1816–1850), who married Austrian diplomat Baron Philipp von Neumann.
- Lady Georgiana Charlotte Anne Somerset (1817–1884), who married Christopher Bethell-Codrington, MP.
- Lady Anne Harriet Charlotte Somerset (1819–1877), who married Colonel Philip James of Dorset.

=== Death ===
Georgiana died at Apsley House, the home of the Duke of Wellington, of an "internal inflammation", only a week after attending a ball. Diarist Charles Greville wrote:

She has been snatched from life at a time when she was becoming every day more fit to live, for her mind, her temper, and her understanding were gradually and rapidly improving; she had faults, but her mind was not vicious, and her defects may be ascribed to her education and to the actual state of the society in which she lived. Her virtues were inherent in her character; every day developed them more and more, and they were such as to make the happiness of all who lived with her and to captivate the affection of all who really knew her.

The Journal of Harriet Arbuthnot notes:

She was only 28, one of the handsomest women in England, had made the most brilliant marriage and was flattered, followed and admired by all the world. It is sad to contrast all this brilliancy with the cold and dreary grave that will so soon close over her; and yet she will then have more tranquility, for her prospects were not happy ones. Lord Worcester, overwhelmed with debts, had lately had executions in his house and, if the Duke of Wellington had not given her rooms in his house, she would not have had a hole to put her head into. . . . .

Her deathbed was attended by wild exhibitions of grief from many of her female friends, who were distraught by the great pain she endured. Her last words were "I never thought death could hurt so much."

A year after the death of his wife, on 29 June 1822, the Marquess of Worcester married her younger half-sister, Emily Frances Smith. Under church law, the proximity of the relationship meant that the marriage could have been voided during the couple's lifetime; this was one of several cases that led to changes in the law under the Marriage Act 1836. The marriage led to a bitter quarrel between the Duke of Wellington, who opposed it and his sister Anne, Emily and Georgiana's mother, who supported it, and they were never close again.
