= Philipp von Neumann =

Austrian diplomat

Philipp Roger Franz Baron von Neumann

Austrian Minister in Brussels
- In office 1850–1851
- Preceded by: Eduard von Woyna
- Succeeded by: Johann von Zaremba

Austrian Minister in Florence
- In office 1844–1847
- Preceded by: Karl Schnitzer von Meerau (as Chargé d'Affaires)
- Succeeded by: Karl Schnitzer von Meerau (as Chargé d'Affaires)

Austrian Minister to the Court of St. James's
- In office 1843–1844
- Preceded by: Paul III Anton, Prince Esterházy
- Succeeded by: Jan Moritz von Dietrichstein-Proskau-Leslie

Personal details
- Born: 4 December 1781 Brussels, Austrian Netherlands
- Died: 14 January 1851 (aged 69) Brussels, Kingdom of Belgium
- Spouse: Lady Charlotte Augusta Frederica Somerset (m. 1844; died 1850)
- Children: 2
- Parent(s): Carl von Neumann; Marie Ducpetiaux

Baron Philipp Roger Franz von Neumann (German: Philipp Roger Franz Freiherr von Neumann; English: Philipp Roger Francis Baron de Neumann; 4 December 1781 – 14 January 1851) was an Austrian diplomat.

== Early life ==
Neumann was born in Brussels (then in the Austrian Netherlands), the son of Carl von Neumann (an official in the Habsburg administration) and his wife, Marie Ducpetiaux. Nothing is known of his education, but, since he did not begin work until he was 21, it seems likely that he attended university. His brother was General-major Maximillian Ritter von Neumann (c. 1778–1846).

== Career ==
Neumann began his career in the Austrian Treasury Service in 1802 and was posted to Venice which had come under Austrian control a few years previously. After just over a year he joined the diplomatic service and was posted to Paris where Prince Klemens Wenzel von Metternich was Austrian ambassador.

Later Neumann joined the staff of the Austrian embassy in London under the ambassador Prince Esterházy; Neumann served as chargé d'affaires in his absence. Neumann's activity was regarded as notable, especially in 1814 and 1815, on the occasion of the remittance of the British subsidies to the Austrian government, when he succeeded in obtaining very favourable conditions for Austria on the question of the rate of exchange. He was on excellent terms with the Duke of Wellington, whose grandniece he married, and with Castlereagh. When Wellington repeated his famous remark that "Nothing except a battle lost can be half as melancholy as a battle won", Neumann tactfully replied that in fact Wellington had never lost a battle. He described Castlereagh's suicide as "a great mystery which perhaps time will explain".

In 1824 Neumann took part in the negotiations between Portugal and Brazil, as a result of King John VI of Portugal and his son Emperor Pedro I of Brazil were reconciled. In December 1826 Neumann was sent to Brazil to negotiate the marriage of Pedro's daughter Maria to his brother Miguel, and the demand by Miguel that he be recognised as regent of Portugal. In October of the following year he attended the negotiations on this matter carried on at Vienna.

In December 1829 Neumann conducted the Treaty of Commerce between Austria and Great Britain. In recognition of his services he was created a Baron by the Emperor Francis I of Austria on 31 August 1830.

In 1844 Neumann became Minister Plenipotentiary and Envoy Extraordinary for Austria to the Court of St. James's. In 1845 he was appointed Austrian minister in Florence, and on 31 December 1849 he was appointed Austrian minister in Brussels.

== Personal life ==
On 5 December 1844 in Marylebone, London, Baron von Neumann married Lady Charlotte Augusta Frederica Somerset (1816-1850), eldest daughter of Henry Somerset, 7th Duke of Beaufort and Georgiana FitzRoy. A Roman Catholic ceremony was celebrated first at the Austrian embassy, Chandos House (officiated by Dr. Griffiths, vicar apostolic of the district of London), followed by a Church of England ceremony at St George's, Hanover Square, Hanover Square (officiated by Dr. Gerald Wellesley). Together, they were the parents of a stillborn son in 1850 and a daughter:

- Natalie von Neumann (b. 1845), who was born in England.

A week after she gave birth to a stillborn son, Lady Charlotte Augusta died, aged 34, on 20 September 1850 in Brussels. Neumann died less than four months later on 14 January 1851 in Brussels. Neumann is buried in the Duke of Beaufort's family vault at Badminton, Gloucestershire. There is a memorial in Badminton church.

=== Honours ===
Neumann was a Knight (since 1822) and a Commander (since 1830) of the Austrian Order of Leopold, Commander of the Portuguese Order of the Tower and Sword, Commander of the Brazilian Order of the Southern Cross, Knight Grand Cross of the Russian Order of St Stanislas. He was also awarded the Austrian Cross for Civil Merit.
