= Henry Somerset, 7th Duke of Beaufort =

British peer, soldier, and politician

His Grace The Duke of Beaufort KG
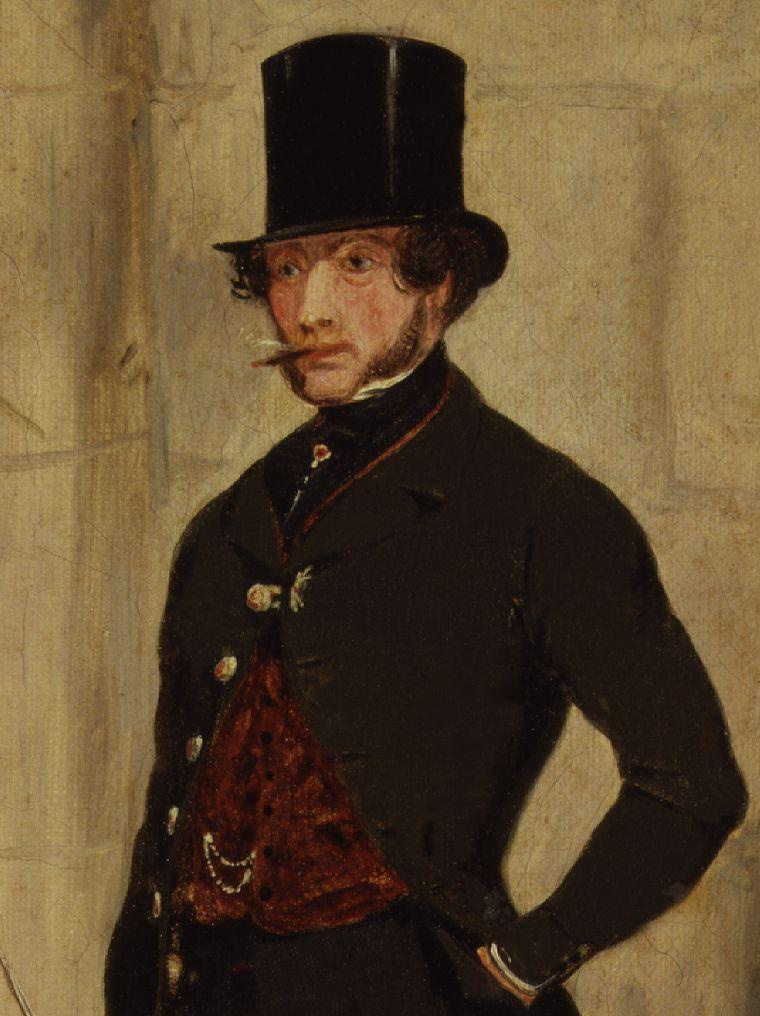
- The Duke of Beaufort by Henry Alken.

Personal details
- Born: 5 February 1792
- Died: 17 November 1853 (aged 61) Badminton House, Gloucestershire
- Party: Tory
- Spouse(s): (1) Georgiana Somerset, Marchioness of Worcester (1792–1821) (2) Emily Culling Smith (1800–1889)
- Children: 10, including Henry
- Parent(s): Henry Somerset, 6th Duke of Beaufort; Lady Charlotte Sophia Leveson-Gower

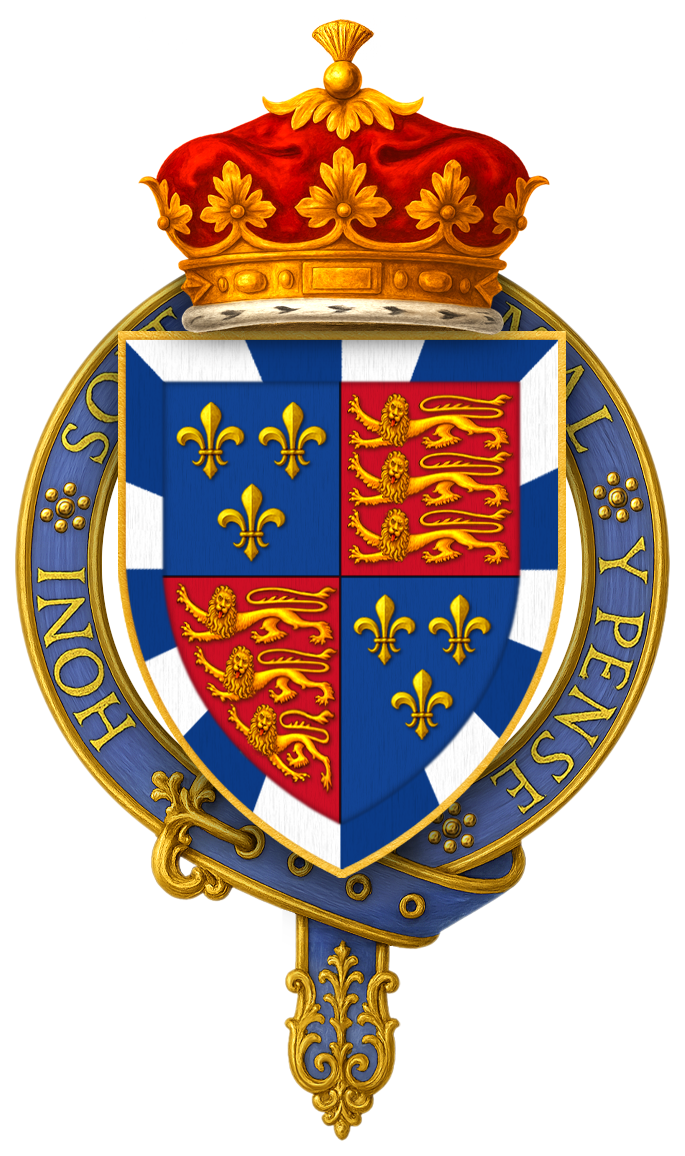
Garter-encircled arms of Henry Somerset, 7th Duke of Beaufort, KG

Major Henry Somerset, 7th Duke of Beaufort (5 February 1792 – 17 November 1853), styled Earl of Glamorgan until 1803 and Marquess of Worcester between 1803 and 1835, was a British peer, soldier, and politician.

== Background ==
Beaufort was the eldest son of Henry Somerset, 6th Duke of Beaufort, and Lady Charlotte Sophia, daughter of Granville Leveson-Gower, 1st Marquess of Stafford. Lord Granville Somerset was his younger brother.

== Military and political career ==
Beaufort was commissioned a cornet in the 10th Hussars on 18 June 1811. He was promoted to lieutenant in the 14th Light Dragoons on 21 August, but transferred back to the 10th Hussars on 6 September. Worcester also served as an aide-de-camp to the Duke of Wellington in Portugal and Spain between 1812 and 1814.

In 1813, Beaufort was returned as Member of Parliament (MP) for the Monmouth Boroughs, as a Tory, and continued to hold the seat until 1831. On 26 October 1815, he transferred to the 7th Hussars. In the following year, he was appointed a Lord of the Admiralty under Lord Liverpool, serving on the Board until 1819. On 2 December 1819, he was made a captain in the 37th Foot, and on 30 December, was promoted to the rank of major.

In the contentious election of 1831, Beaufort was defeated by Benjamin Hall at Monmouth Boroughs. While Hall's victory was overturned on petition and Beaufort regained the seat, he again lost to Hall in the 1832 election. He was appointed lieutenant-colonel commandant of the Gloucestershire Yeomanry in 1834. In 1835, he successfully contested West Gloucestershire, but left the House when he succeeded as Duke of Beaufort that November. In 1836, he became Lord High Steward of Bristol and was appointed a Knight of the Garter on 11 April 1842.

== Family ==
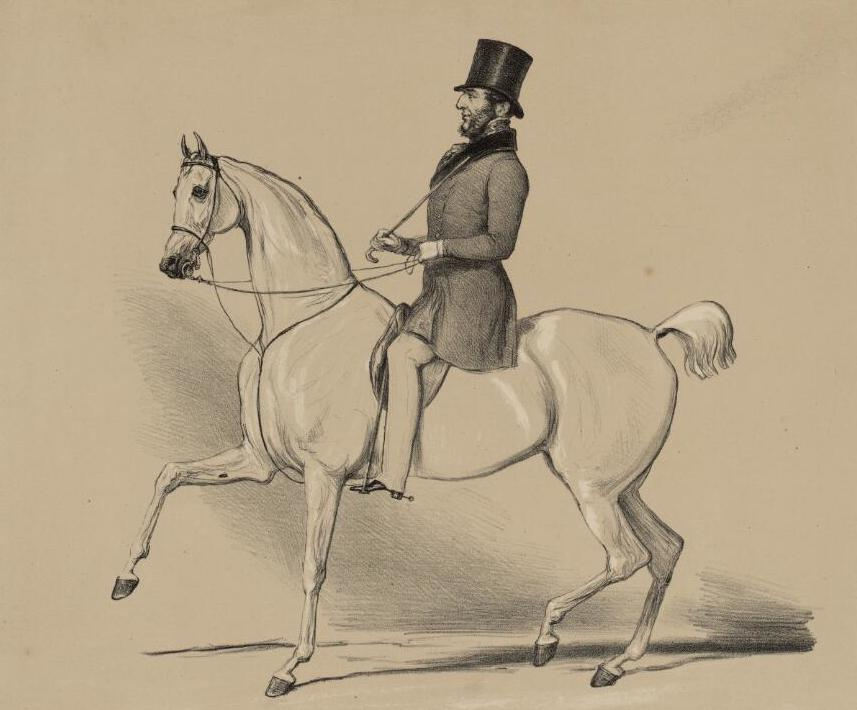
Lord Beaufort mounted on his horse, 1841

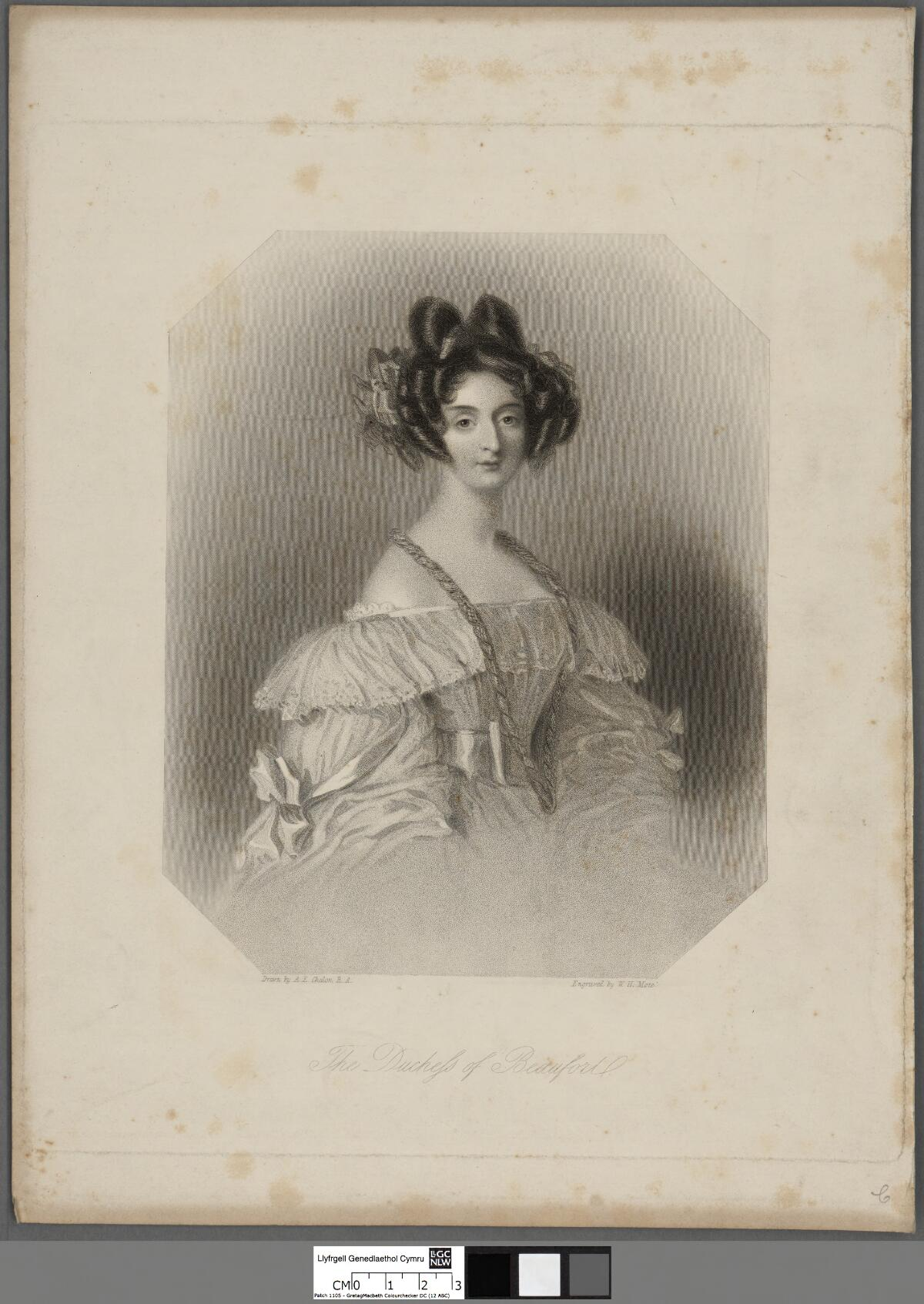
Emily, The Duchess of Beaufort, 1841

Beaufort married Georgiana Frederica Fitzroy (1792–1821), daughter of the Hon. Henry FitzRoy and Lady Anne Wellesley, on 25 July 1814. They had three daughters:

- Lady Charlotte Augusta Frederica Somerset (1816–1850), married, on 5 December 1844, Baron Philipp von Neumann (4 December 1781 – 14 January 1851), an Austrian diplomat, by whom she had issue.
  - Natalie von Neumann
  - Charlotte Augusta von Neumann
- Lady Georgiana Charlotte Anne Somerset (1817–1884), married, in 1836, Sir Christopher Bethell-Codrington, son of Christopher Bethell-Codrington.
  - Alice Bethell-Codrington, married Sir Henry Mervyn Vavasour, 3rd Bt.
  - Sir Gerald Codrington, 1st Bt., married Lady Edith Denison, daughter of William Denison, 1st Earl of Londesborough.
  - George Bethell-Codrington.
- Lady Anne Harriet Charlotte Somerset (1819–1877), married Colonel Philip James of Dorset.

After the death of his wife in 1821, he married her younger half-sister, Emily Frances Smith, daughter of Charles Culling Smith, on 29 June 1822; they were both daughters of Lady Anne Smith, the Duke of Wellington's sister. (This marriage, in contravention of the canon laws of the Church of England, rendered his marriage potentially annullable for many years: for this reason, Wellington himself strongly opposed it.) They had seven children, one son and six daughters:

- Henry Charles FitzRoy Somerset, 8th Duke of Beaufort (1824–1899), married Lady Georgiana Charlotte Curzon and had issue.
- Lady Emily Blanche Charlotte Somerset (1828–1895), married George Hay-Drummond, 12th Earl of Kinnoull.
  - George Robert Hay, Viscount Dupplin, married Agnes, daughter of James Duff, 5th Earl Fife.
  - Lady Constance Blanche Louisa Hay, married cricketer Walter Hadow.
  - Archibald Hay, 13th Earl of Kinnoull.
  - Capt. Hon. Alistair George Hay, married Camilla, daughter of Algernon Greville, 2nd Baron Greville.
  - Hon. Claude George Drummond Hay, unmarried.
  - Lady Muriel Henrietta Constance, married Prince Alexander Münster.
- Lady Rose Caroline Mary Somerset (1829–1885), who eloped to marry Captain Francis Frederick Lovell, son of Peter Harvey Lovell. Four daughters.
- Lady Henriëtta Louisa Priscilla Somerset (1831–1863), married John Morant, son of John Morant and Lady Caroline Hay. No issue.
- Lady Geraldine Harriett Anne Somerset (1832–1915), served as Lady-in-Waiting to Princess Augusta, Duchess of Cambridge and left a diary: died unmarried
- Lady Katherine Emily Mary Somerset (1834–1914), married Arthur Walsh, 2nd Baron Ormathwaite.
  - Arthur Walsh, 3rd Baron Ormathwaite, unmarried.
  - George Walsh, 4th Baron Ormathwaite, unmarried.
  - Reginald Walsh, 5th Baron Ormathwaite, married Lady Margaret Douglas-Home, daughter of Charles Douglas-Home, 12th Earl of Home.
- Lady Edith Frances Wilhelmina Somerset (1838–1915), married William Denison, 1st Earl of Londesborough, and had issue.
  - William Henry Francis Denison, 2nd Earl of Londesborough, who married Lady Grace Adelaide Fane, daughter of Francis Fane, 12th Earl of Westmorland.
  - Lady Edith Henrietta Sybil Denison, married her half-cousin Sir Gerald Codrington, 1st Bt.
  - Lady Lilian Katharine Selina Denison, who married Newton Charles Ogle of Kirkley.
  - Lady Ida Emily Augusta Denison, married Sir George Reresby Sitwell, 4th Baronet.

In 1840, Beaufort bought the house at 22 Arlington Street in St. James's, a district of the City of Westminster in central London from John Pratt, 1st Marquess Camden and proceeded to expend enormous sums refurbishing the interior of the house. He renamed the house after his title and during his residency, it was known as "Beaufort House." He hired architect Owen Jones, who had studied the Alhambra to embellish the interiors. Beaufort sold the house a year before he died to William Hamilton, 11th Duke of Hamilton.

Beaufort died in 1853, aged 61 at Badminton House, Gloucestershire, and was buried at St Michael and All Angels Church, Badminton. He is best known today for his two marriages, and his involvement, as a very young man, with the courtesan Harriette Wilson, to whom he apparently proposed marriage.

== Fictional portrayal ==
Both Beaufort and Harriette Wilson feature as minor characters in Black Ajax by George MacDonald Fraser.

== Ancestry ==
Ancestors of Henry Somerset, 7th Duke of Beaufort

16. Henry Somerset, 2nd Duke of Beaufort
8. Charles Noel Somerset, 4th Duke of Beaufort
17. Lady Rachel Noel
4. Henry Somerset, 5th Duke of Beaufort
18. John Symes Berkeley
9. Elizabeth Berkeley
19. Elizabeth Norborne
2. Henry Somerset, 6th Duke of Beaufort
20. Hugh Boscawen, 1st Viscount Falmouth
10. Admiral Rt. Hon. Edward Boscawen
21. Charlotte Godfrey
5. Elizabeth Boscawen
22. William Evelyn-Glanville
11. Frances Glanville
23. Frances Glanville
1. Henry Somerset, 7th Duke of Beaufort
24. John Leveson-Gower, 1st Baron Gower
12. John Leveson-Gower, 1st Earl Gower
25. Lady Catherine Manners
6. Granville Leveson-Gower, 1st Marquess of Stafford
26. Evelyn Pierrepont, 1st Duke of Kingston-upon-Hull
13. Lady Evelyn Pierrepont
27. Lady Mary Feilding
3. Lady Charlotte Sophia Leveson-Gower
28. James Stewart, 5th Earl of Galloway
14. Alexander Stewart, 6th Earl of Galloway
29. Lady Catherine Montgomerie
7. Lady Susannah Stewart
30. John Cochrane, 4th Earl of Dundonald
15. Lady Catherine Cochrane
31. Lady Anne Murray

Parliament of the United Kingdom
Preceded by Lord Charles Somerset	Member of Parliament for Monmouth Boroughs; 1813–1831	Succeeded by Benjamin Hall
Preceded by Benjamin Hall	Member of Parliament for Monmouth Boroughs; 1831–1832	Succeeded by Benjamin Hall
Preceded by Hon. Grantley Berkeley; Hon. Augustus Moreton	Member for Gloucestershire West; 1835; With: Hon. Grantley Berkeley 1832–1852	Succeeded by Hon. Grantley Berkeley; Robert Blagden Hale
Peerage of England
Preceded by Henry Somerset	Duke of Beaufort; 1835–1853	Succeeded by Henry Somerset
