= George Burnett (officer of arms) =

Scottish officer of arms

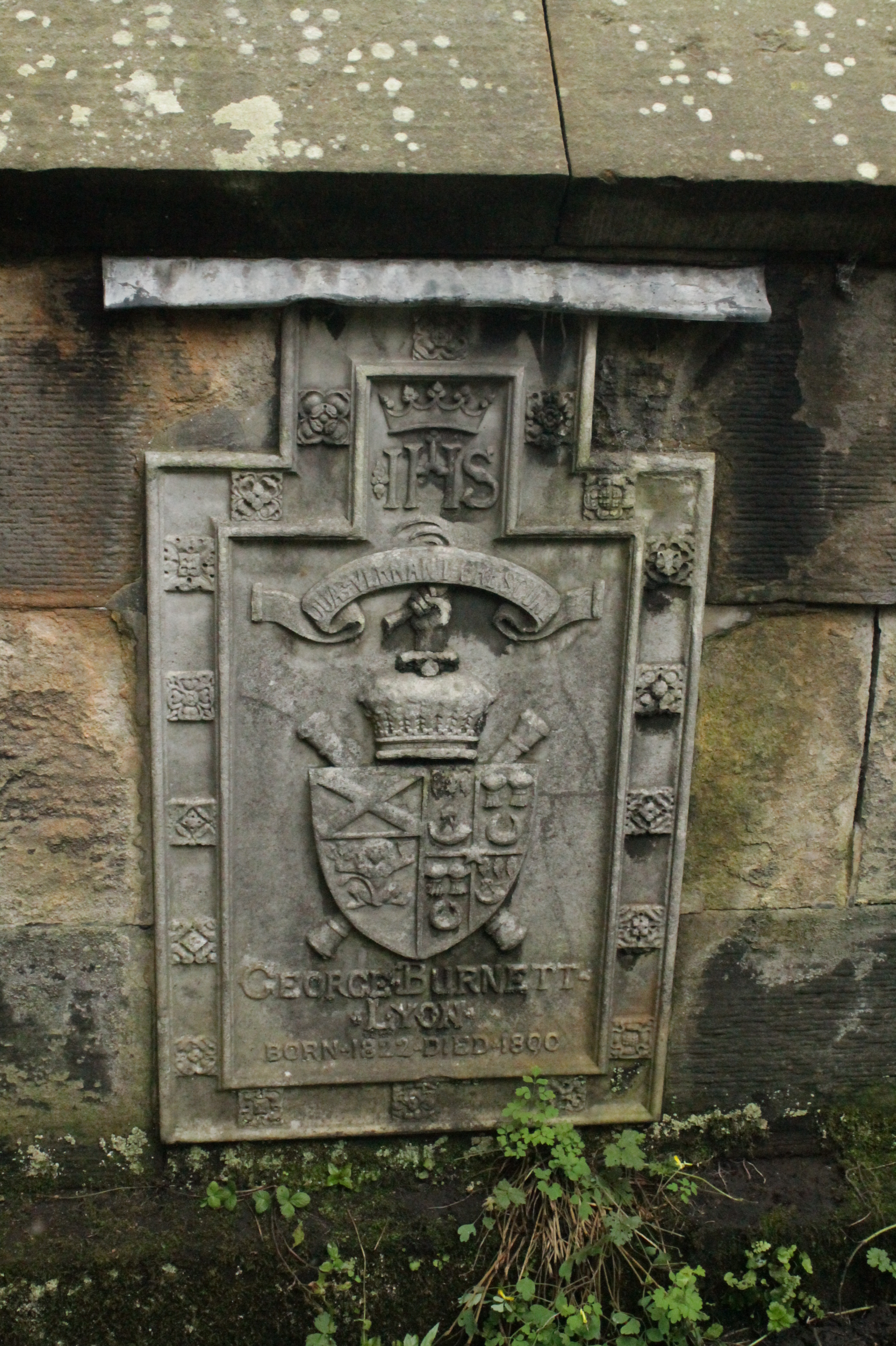
The grave of George Burnett Lyon, St John's Church, Edinburgh

George Burnett, LLD, WS (9 March 1822 – 1890) was a Scottish officer of arms who was Lord Lyon King of Arms from 1866 until his death in 1890.

== Life ==
He was born on 9 March 1822, the second son of John Burnett, 5th Laird of Kemnay in Aberdeenshire. He trained as a lawyer (normal for the Lord Lyon) and in 1860 appears as an advocate in Edinburgh living at 21 Ainslie Place on the Moray Estate. He was appointed Lord Lyon King of Arms in 1866 and served in that post until his death in 1890, being known in this period as George Burnett, Lord Lyon.

A son was the politician John George Burnett.

== Arms ==
Coat of arms of George Burnett
Escutcheon Quarterly (1&4) Argent three holly leaves in chief Vert and a hunting horn in base Sable garnished and stringed Gules (Burnett); (2&3) Azure two garbs in chief and a crescent in base or, a mullet sable in heart point for cadency.

== See also ==
- Herald
- Heraldry
- King of Arms
- Pursuivant

Heraldic offices
Preceded by The Earl of Kinnoull	Lord Lyon King of Arms; 1866–1890	Succeeded by Sir James Balfour Paul
