= William Francis Crosbie =

William Francis Crosbie (died 11 September 1768, was 48) was an Irish Member of Parliament.

In 1750, he married Frances Wesley, daughter of Richard Wesley, 1st Baron Mornington, and in 1758 he was elected to succeed his brother-in-law Garret Wesley, 2nd Baron Mornington as Member for Trim in the Irish House of Commons, sitting until 1760. His son, William Arthur Crosbie, later also served as MP for Trim.
