= Marie Hay =

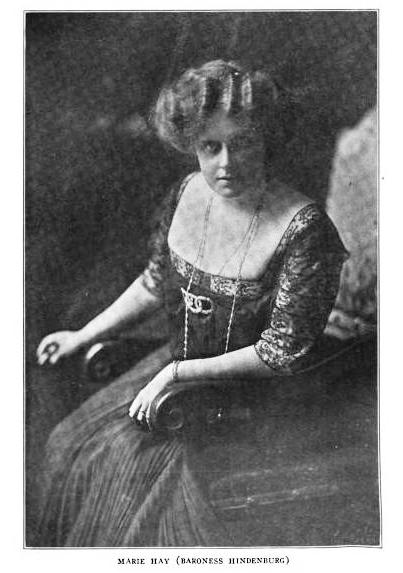
- Born: Marie Blanche Hay-Drummond; 6 December 1873; London
- Died: 13 December 1938
- Occupation: Writer
- Spouse: Herbert von Hindenburg
- Parents: George Hay-Drummond, Viscount Dupplin (father); Agnes Duff (mother)

Agnes Blanche Marie Hay-Drummond, Baroness von Hindenburg (6 December 1873 – 13 December 1938) was a British writer of historical romances under her maiden name Marie Hay.

Marie Hay was born on 6 December 1873 in London, the daughter of George Robert Hay-Drummond, Viscount Dupplin and Lady Agnes Cecil Emmeline Duff. She was the granddaughter of two earls, George Hay-Drummond, 12th Earl of Kinnoull and James Duff, 5th Earl Fife.

Hay married at the German church in Rome on 21 February 1903 Herbert von Beneckendorff und von Hindenburg, a German diplomat.

Her work is largely historical romance and historical fiction. She wrote fictionalized biographies of Elizabeth of Bohemia. The Winter Queen (1910), and Wilhelmine von Graevenitz, A German Pompadour (1906). Her Mas'aniello (1913) is a romance set during the Neapolitan Revolt of 1647. In her The Evil Vineyard (1923), an English woman, Mary Latimer marries an older man, archeologist George Latimer, and lives in an Italian house called La Vignaccia ("The Evil Vinyard") in Minusio, haunted by the ghost of a murderous Landsknecht, Heinrich von Brunnen. Carl Jung included the novel in his 1925 Seminar on Analytical Psychology as an example of anima.

Marie Hay died on 13 December 1938.

== Bibliography ==
- Diane de Poytiers (1900)
- An Unrequited Loyalty (1901)
- A German Pompadour: Being the Extraordinary History of Wilhelmine von Graevenitz, Landhofmeisterin of Wirtemberg: A Narrative of the Eighteenth Century London: A. Constable, 1906.
- The Winter Queen: The Story of Elizabeth of Bohemia (1910)
- Mas'aniello: A Neapolitan Tragedy. London: Constable, 1913.
- The Story of a Swiss Poet (1919)
- The Evil Vineyard G. P. Putnam's Sons, 1923.
