= Custos Rotulorum of Meath =

Civil officer in County Meath

The Custos Rotulorum of Meath was the highest civil officer in County Meath. The position was later combined with that of Lord Lieutenant of Meath.

== Incumbents ==
- 1679–?1714 Henry Hamilton-Moore, 3rd Earl of Drogheda (died 1714)
- 1769–?1781: Garret Wesley, 1st Earl of Mornington (died 1781)
- 1781–1842 Richard Wellesley (died 1842)

For later custodes rotulorum, see Lord Lieutenant of Meath
