= Elizabeth Fortescue =

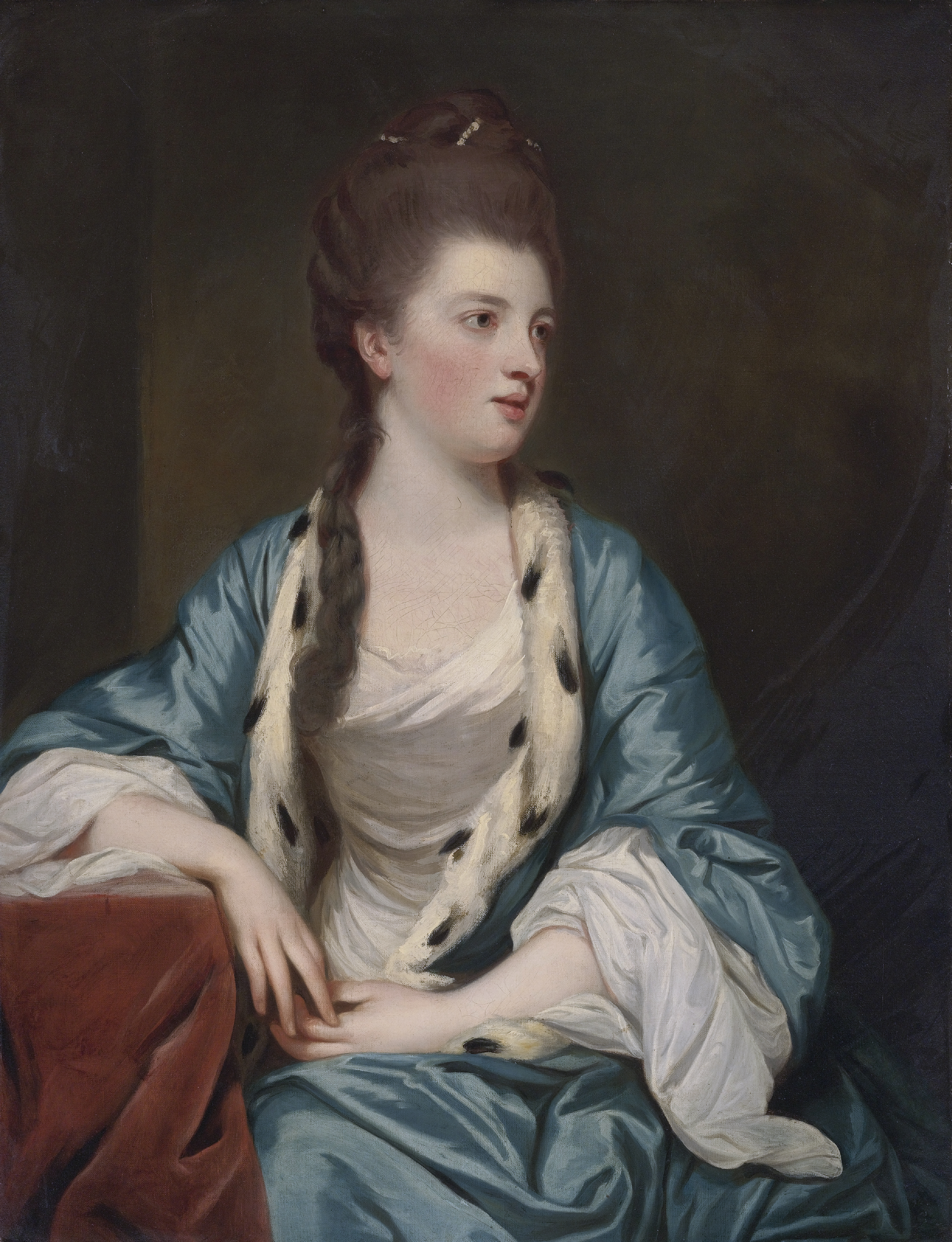
Her portrait by Reynolds.

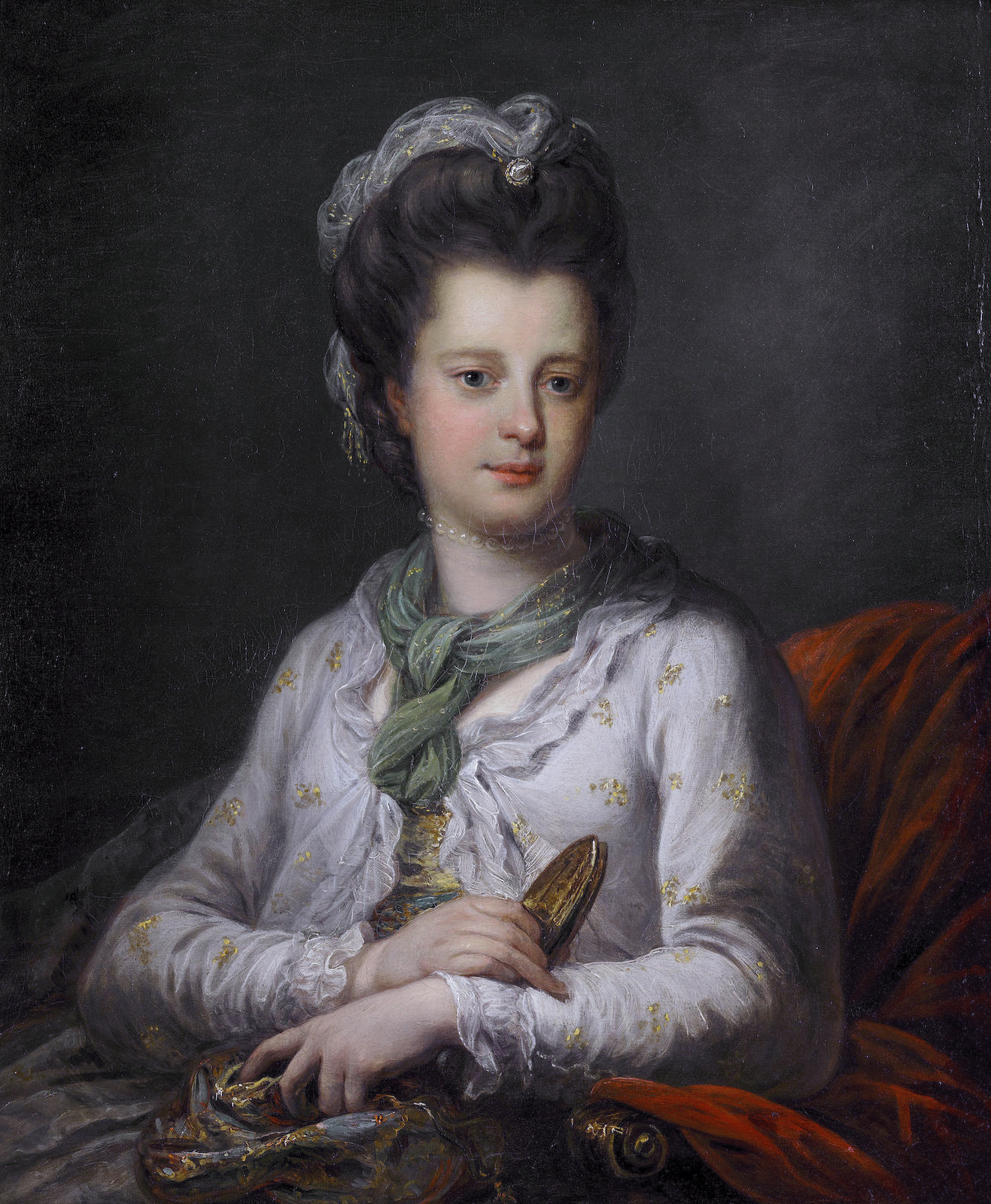
Portrait by Angelica Kauffman

Elizabeth, Marchioness of Lothian (née Fortescue; 3 April 1745 – 30 September 1780) was a noblewoman in the peerage of Great Britain and Ireland. She was a daughter of Chichester Fortescue (1718–1757), High Sheriff of County Down in what is now Northern Ireland. Around 1769 she was painted by Joshua Reynolds.

On 15 July 1762, she married William John Kerr (1737-1815), who was then styled Lord Newbottle or Newbattle and Earl of Ancram. After the death of Kerr's father in 1775, he inherited the Marquisate of Lothian, making Elizabeth a marchioness by marriage. He and Elizabeth Kerr had nine children, the last of which was Lord Robert Kerr, born on 14 September 1780. She died in Marylebone 16 days later.

== Styles ==
- 1745–1762: Miss Elizabeth Fortescue
- 1762–1767: Elizabeth, Lady Newbattle
- 1767–1775: Elizabeth, Countess of Ancrum
- 1775–1780: Elizabeth, Marchioness of Lothian
