= Trim (Parliament of Ireland constituency) =

Pre-1801 Irish constituency

- Former borough constituency for the Irish House of Commons
- County: County Meath
- Borough: Trim

–1801
- Replaced by: Disfranchised

Trim was a constituency and rotten borough in Trim, County Meath, represented in the Irish House of Commons until 1800.

== Members of Parliament ==
- 1560 John Parker and Patrick Martell
- 1585 Moses Hamon and Thomas Gwyre
- 1613–1615 Sir Thomas Ashe and Roger Jones
- 1634–1635 Robert, Lord Dillon and Valerian Weasley
- 1639–1649 Robert, Lord Dillon (elevated to the peerage and replaced by James Whyte. Whyte died and was replaced 1643 by Thomas Trafford) and Patrick Barnewall of Kilbrew (expelled and replaced 1642 by George Peasley. Peasley died and was replaced 1642 by Thomas Coote)
- 1661–1666 Sir Thomas Gifford, 1st Baronet (died and replaced 1662 by Henry Whitfield) and Alexander Jephson (Jephson executed July 1663. Replaced 1663 by Arthur Dillon)

=== 1689–1801 ===
Election	First MP	Second MP
1689	Nicholas Cusack	Walter Nangle
1692	Stafford Lightbourne	Garret Wesley
1695	Stafford Lightbourne	William Napper
1697	Robert Johnson	William Napper
1703	James Napper	William Napper
1709	James Napper	John Bligh
1713	Richard Ashe	Thomas Jones
1715	John Perceval	John Keating
1717	John Perceval	Robert Perceval
1719	Thomas Carter	Robert Perceval
1727	Garret Wesley	Richard Ashe
1728	Garret Wesley	John Wade
1729	Richard Wesley	John Wade
1735	Richard Wesley	Joseph Ashe
1747	Chichester Fortescue	Joseph Ashe
1757	Hon. Garret Wesley	Joseph Ashe
1758	William Francis Crosbie	Joseph Ashe
1761	Robert Perceval	John Pomeroy
1768	Thomas Fortescue	John Pomeroy
1780	Richard Wesley, Viscount Wellesley	John Pomeroy
1781	William Arthur Crosbie	John Pomeroy
1783	Hon. William Wesley	John Pomeroy
1790	Hon. Arthur Wellesley	John Pomeroy
1791	Hon. Arthur Wellesley	Hon. Clotworthy Taylor
February 1795	Hon. Arthur Wellesley	Hon. Henry Wellesley
1795	Hon. Arthur Wellesley	William Arthur Crosbie
1798	Sir Chichester Fortescue	William Arthur Crosbie
1801	Constituency disenfranchised	
