= Lord Lieutenant of Perthshire =

Ceremonial officer in Perthshire, Scotland

This is a list of people who served as Lord Lieutenant of Perthshire. The office was replaced by the Lord Lieutenant of Perth and Kinross in 1975.

- John Murray, 4th Duke of Atholl 17 March 1794 – 29 September 1830
- Thomas Hay-Drummond, 11th Earl of Kinnoull 18 October 1830 – 18 February 1866
- George Kinnaird, 9th Lord Kinnaird 26 February 1866 – 7 January 1878
- John Stewart-Murray, 7th Duke of Atholl 9 February 1878 – 20 January 1917
- John Stewart-Murray, 8th Duke of Atholl 15 March 1917 – 15 March 1942
- Kenneth Kinnaird, 12th Lord Kinnaird 28 April 1942 – 1960
- Mungo Murray, 7th Earl of Mansfield and Mansfield 30 April 1960 – 2 September 1971
- David Henry Butter 25 November 1971 – 1975
- Butter became Lord Lieutenant of Perth and Kinross
