= Gerald Valerian Wellesley (born 1770) =

Irish cleric (1770–1848)

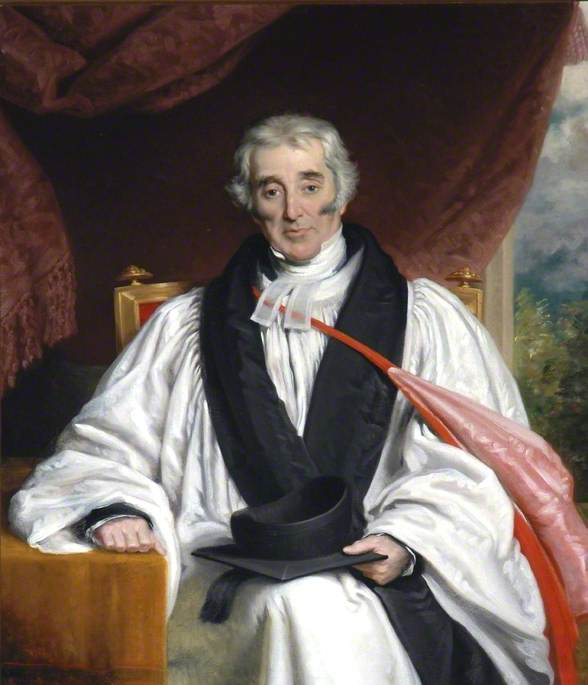
Portrait of Wellesley by Richard Evans

The Honourable Gerald Valerian Wellesley (1770–1848) was a British clergyman of the Church of Ireland.

He was the fourth surviving son of Garret Wesley, 1st Earl of Mornington and Anne Hill-Trevor, and the brother of politician Richard Wellesley, 1st Marquess Wellesley, general Arthur Wellesley, 1st Duke of Wellington, and diplomat Henry Wellesley, 1st Baron Cowley. When he was born his family were part of the Anglo-Irish Protestant Ascendancy based in Trim, County Meath.

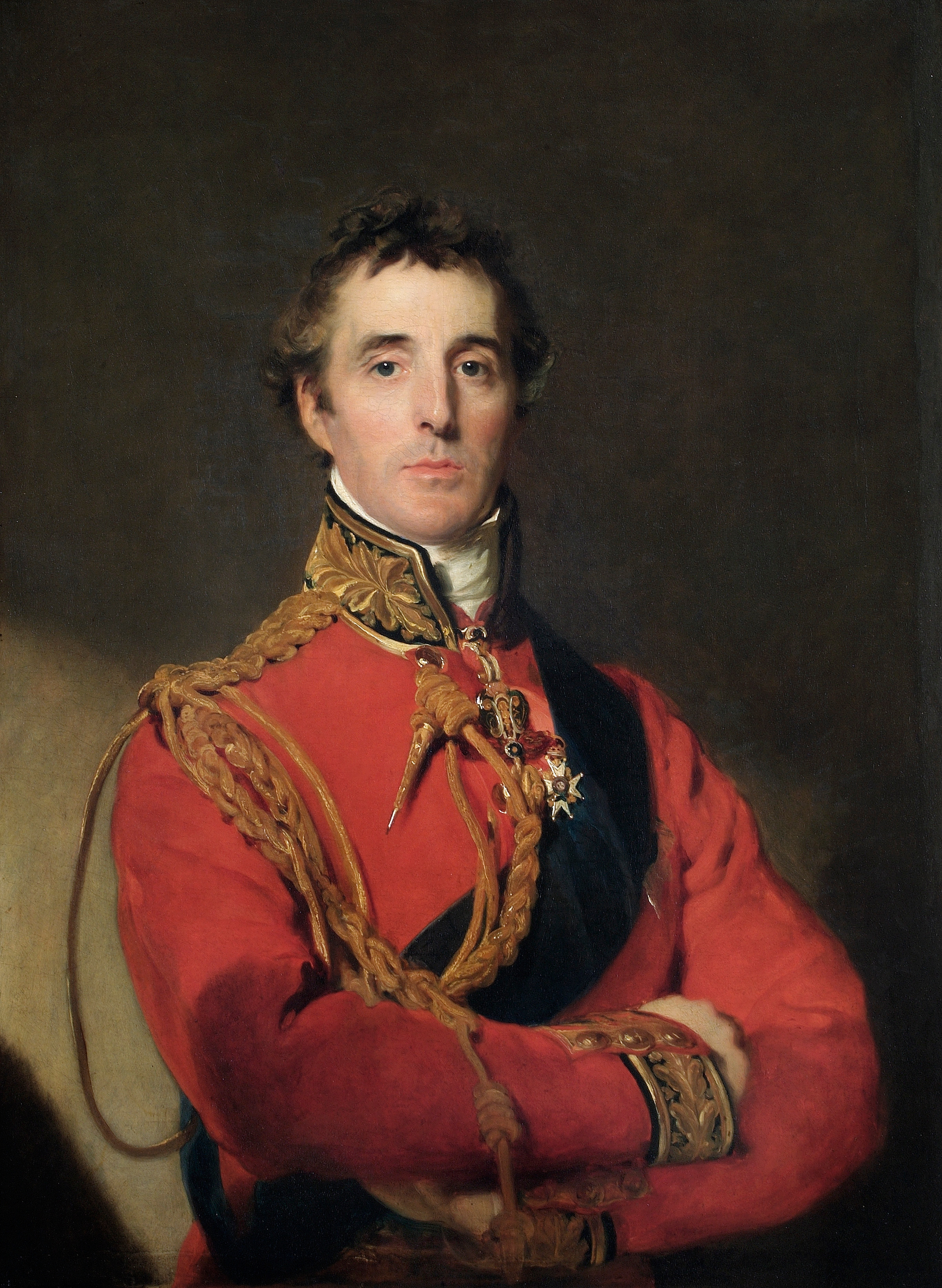
Portrait of Wellington in 1815. Wellesley was the younger brother of the celebrated general the 1st Duke of Wellington who tried to advance Gerald's career in the Church

In 1806 he performed the Dublin wedding ceremony of his brother Arthur and Catherine Pakenham.

He rose to be Prebendary of Durham, but future promotion was halted by his complex relationship with his wife Lady Emily Cadogan whom Wellesley had married while he was a rector in Chelsea. Their son, Sir George Wellesley, became an admiral in the Royal Navy.

In 1826 he was a source of conflict between his brother Wellington and his political ally the Prime Minister Lord Liverpool. Wellington pushed for his brother to be granted a vacant Irish bishopric, and was supported by Richard who was now the Viceroy of Ireland, but Liverpool objected as he was living with a woman who wasn't his wife. The dispute, which strained the relationship between the two, was resolved after Liverpool enlisted the support of both the Chief Secretary for Ireland and the Archbishop of Canterbury to support his case.

== Bibliography ==
- Gash, Norman. Lord Liverpool: The Life and Political Career of Robert Banks Jenkinson. Faber & Faber, 2016.
- Muir, Rory. Wellington: The Path to Victory, 1769-1814. Yale University Press, 2010.
