= Henry FitzRoy (cricketer) =

Personal information
- Born: 13 September 1765
- Died: 19 March 1794 (aged 28)

Domestic team information
- Years: Team
- Marylebone Cricket Club

The Honourable Henry FitzRoy (13 September 1765 in Southampton – 19 March 1794 in England) was a son of the 1st Baron Southampton who, as a member of Marylebone Cricket Club (MCC), regularly took part in historically important matches as an amateur player. He made 44 known appearances from the 1788 season to the 1793 season.

FitzRoy is believed to have been right-handed as both batsman and bowler. He was a very useful bowler (underarm, pace unknown) who took 38 known wickets in his 44 matches, twice taking at least four in an innings. As a batsman, he made a few good scores, his best being 89 for MCC v Essex at Hornchurch in 1791. A score of 89 at that time, given the prevailing conditions, was very high indeed. FitzRoy took only 11 catches in his career which suggests he was an outfielder.

FitzRoy was brother-in-law to Arthur Wellesley, 1st Duke of Wellington having married Lady Anne Wellesley (c.1775 – 16 December 1844) on 7 January 1790. They had two daughters, including Georgiana Frederica (1792–1821).

Like John Tufton, Thomas Scott and a few others, FitzRoy died very young when the trend among cricketers of his era was to live a long life. He was playing regularly in 1793 but died, aged only 28, before the beginning of the 1794 season.

== Senior cricket career record ==
Season	–	M	I	runs	HS	ct	wkts	BB
1788	–	2	3	0	0	0	1	1-?
1789	–	2	4	20	14	0	3	3-?
1790	–	6	11	139	36	1	14	4-?
1791	–	13	24	386	89	1	12	3-?
1792	–	12	20	96	20	4	3	3-?
1793	–	9	16	197	64	5	5	3-?
Totals	–	44	78	838	89	11	38	4-?

== External sources ==
- CricketArchive record of Henry FitzRoy
