= Thomas Hay-Drummond, 11th Earl of Kinnoull =

Scottish peer (1785–1866)

The Right Honourable The Earl of Kinnoull
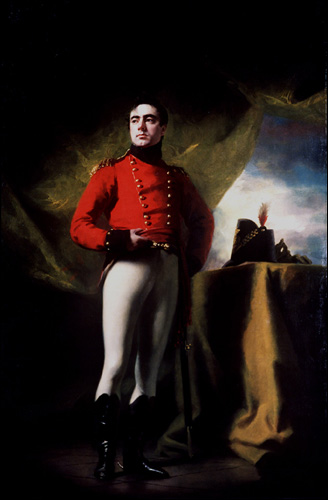
- The 11th Earl of Kinnoull

Lord Lyon King of Arms
- In office 1804–1866
- Preceded by: Robert Hay-Drummond
- Succeeded by: George Burnett

Lord Lieutenant of Perthshire
- In office 1830–1866
- Preceded by: The Duke of Atholl
- Succeeded by: The Lord Kinnaird

Personal details
- Born: 5 April 1785 Bath, Somerset
- Died: 18 February 1866 (aged 80) Torquay, Devon
- Spouse: Louisa Burton Rowley (m. 1848)
- Children: 9, including George
- Parents: Robert Hay-Drummond, 10th Earl of Kinnoull; Sarah Harley

Thomas Robert Hay-Drummond, 11th Earl of Kinnoull (5 April 1785 – 18 February 1866), styled Viscount Dupplin between 1787 and 1804, was a Scottish peer. His titles were Earl of Kinnoull, Viscount Dupplin and Lord Hay of Kinfauns in the Peerage of Scotland; and Baron Hay of Pedwardine in the Peerage of Great Britain.

== Biography ==
Hay-Drummond was born in Bath, Somerset, the son of Robert Hay-Drummond, 10th Earl of Kinnoull and his second wife, Sarah Harley, daughter of Thomas Harley, Lord Mayor of London. Hay served as Lord Lyon King of Arms from 1804 until 1866, succeeding his father in that office.

He served as colonel of the Perthshire Militia from 1809 to 1855, and from 1830 to 1866 he was Lord Lieutenant of Perthshire.

Lord Kinnoull married Louisa Burton Rowley, daughter of Sir Charles Rowley, 1st Baronet, on 17 August 1824. They had nine children:

- Lady Louisa Hay-Drummond, married Sir Thomas Moncreiffe, 7th Baronet; one of their daughters was Georgina Ward, Countess of Dudley
- George Hay-Drummond, 12th Earl of Kinnoull (1827–1897)
- Lady Sarah Hay-Drummond (1828–1859), married Hugh Cholmondeley, 2nd Baron Delamere of Vale Royal (b. 3 Oct 1811, d. 1 Aug 1887)
- Captain Hon. Robert Hay-Drummond (1831–1855)
- Lady Frances Hay-Drummond (died 1886)
- Captain Hon. Arthur Hay-Drummond (1833–1900), Captain in the Royal Navy, succeeded to the Cromlix and Innerpeffray estates; married 1855 Katherine Derby
- Lady Elizabeth Hay-Drummond (1835–1902), married Sir Frederick Arthur, 2nd Baronet
- Lady Augusta Sophia Hay-Drummond (died 1915), mother of Geoffrey Twisleton-Wykeham-Fiennes, 18th Baron Saye and Sele
- Colonel Hon. Charles Rowley Hay-Drummond (1836–1918)

He died in Torquay, Devon, where he had lived the last six months of his life. The earldom passed to his eldest son, George.

Heraldic offices
Preceded by The Earl of Kinnoull	Lord Lyon King of Arms; 1804–1866	Succeeded by George Burnett
Honorary titles
Preceded by The Duke of Atholl	Lord Lieutenant of Perthshire; 1830–1866	Succeeded by The Lord Kinnaird
Masonic offices
Preceded by Viscount Glenorchy	Grand Master of the Grand Lodge of Scotland; 1826–1827	Succeeded by Lord Elcho
Peerage of Scotland
Preceded by Robert Hay-Drummond	Earl of Kinnoull; 1804–1866	Succeeded by George Hay-Drummond
