= Chichester Fortescue (1718–1757) =

Irish Member of Parliament

Chichester Fortescue (5 June 1718 – 16 July 1757) was an Irish Member of Parliament.

He represented Trim in the Irish House of Commons between 1747 and 1757.

In 1743 he married The Hon. Elizabeth Colley Wesley, daughter of Richard Wesley, 1st Baron Mornington and sister of Garret Wesley, 1st Earl of Mornington. Their children included Thomas, also an MP; Elizabeth, who married William Kerr, 5th Marquess of Lothian; Chichester, an admiral and MP; and Gerald, who served as Ulster King of Arms.

== Sources ==
- https://web.archive.org/web/20090601105535/http://www.leighrayment.com/commons/irelandcommons.htm
- http://thepeerage.com/p10646.htm#i106451
