= George Wellesley =

Royal Navy Admiral (1814–1901)

Admiral Sir George Wellesley GCB
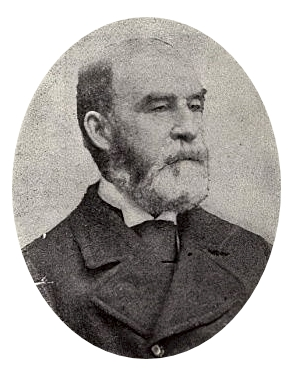
- Admiral Sir George Wellesley
- Born: 2 August 1814
- Died: 6 April 1901 (aged 86); London, England
- Military career
- Allegiance: United Kingdom
- Branch: Royal Navy
- Service years: 1828–1879
- Rank: Admiral
- Commands: First Naval Lord; North America and West Indies Station; Channel Squadron; Indian Navy; HMS Cornwallis; HMS Daedalus
- Conflicts: Oriental Crisis; Crimean War
- Awards: Knight Grand Cross of the Order of the Bath

Admiral Sir George Greville Wellesley GCB (2 August 1814 – 6 April 1901) was a Royal Navy officer. As a junior officer he took part in the capture of Acre during the Oriental Crisis in 1840 and, as Captain of HMS Cornwallis in the Baltic Fleet, he took part in the Bombardment of Sveaborg in August 1855 during the Crimean War. He went on to be Commander-in-Chief of the North America and West Indies Station and then Commander-in-Chief of the Channel Squadron but was relieved of the latter post by a court-martial after an incident in which an armoured frigate, which had been under his command at the time, ran aground at Pearl Rock off Gibraltar in July 1871. He was appointed First Naval Lord in November 1877 and in that capacity he secured a considerable increase in naval construction, for example on the Colossus-class battleships, although some of these ships were of doubtful quality.

== Early career ==
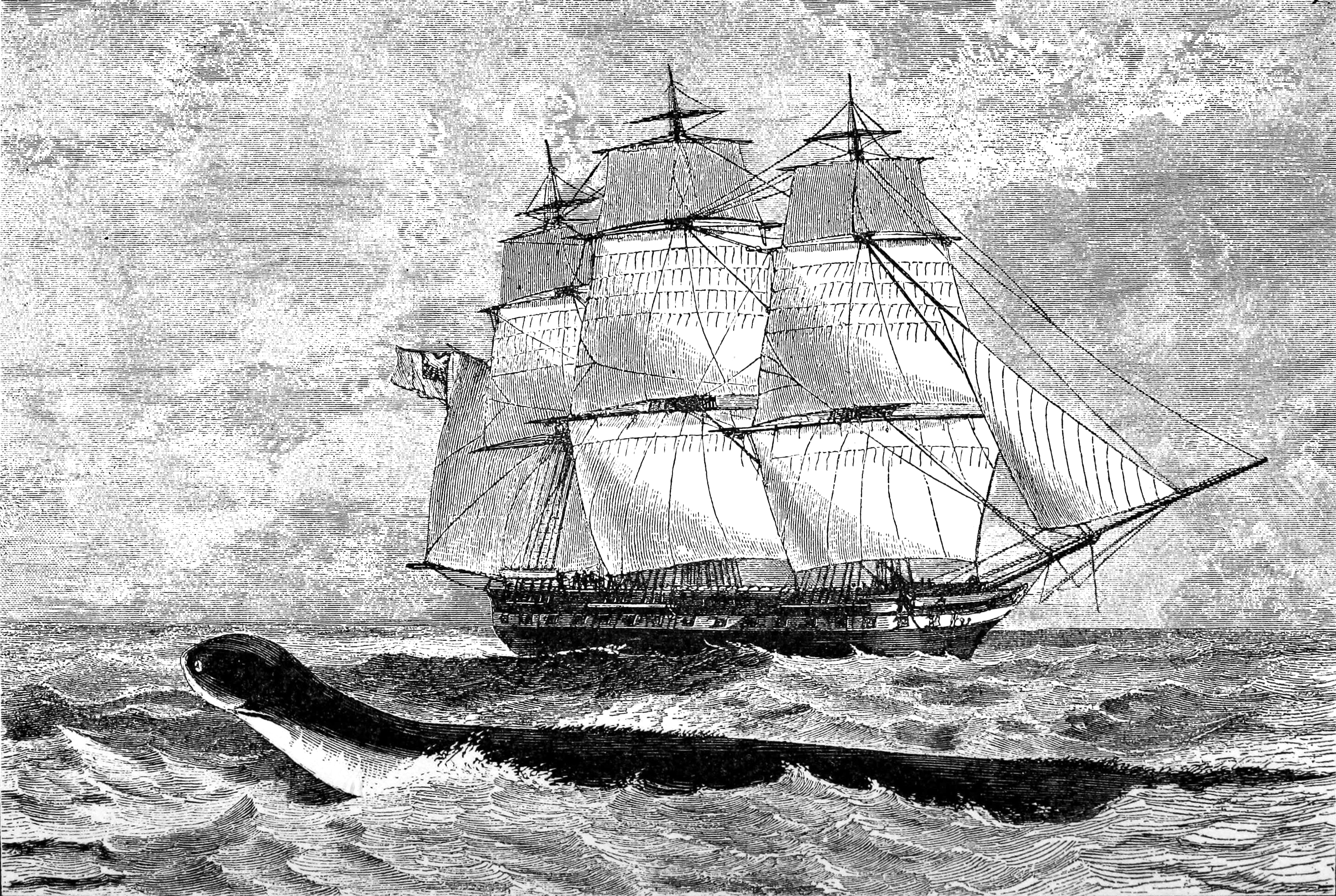
The fifth-rate HMS Daedalus which Wellesley commanded

Born the son of Gerald Valerian Wellesley (brother of the Arthur Wellesley, 1st Duke of Wellington) and Lady Emily Mary (daughter of Charles Cadogan, 1st Earl Cadogan), Wellesley joined the Royal Navy in 1828. After initial training at the Royal Navy College at Portsmouth and promotion to lieutenant on 22 April 1838, he was posted to the first-rate HMS Princess Charlotte in the Mediterranean Fleet. He transferred to the fifth-rate HMS Castor in March 1839 and took part in operations on the coast of Syria taking part in the capture of Acre in November 1840 during the Oriental Crisis. He joined the fifth-rate HMS Thalia on the East Indies Station in November 1841 and, having been promoted to commander on 16 April 1842, he transferred to the brig HMS Childers also on the East Indies Station.

Promoted to captain on 2 December 1844, Wellesley was given command of the fifth-rate HMS Daedalus on the Pacific Station in July 1849 and then became Captain of HMS Cornwallis in the Baltic Fleet in February 1855 taking part in the Bombardment of Sveaborg in August 1855 during the Crimean War. He was appointed a Companion of the Order of the Bath in February 1856. He remained in command of HMS Cornwallis when she moved to the North America and West Indies Station in 1856 and then commanded the Indian Navy from 1857 until it became the Bombay Marine in 1862.

== Senior command ==
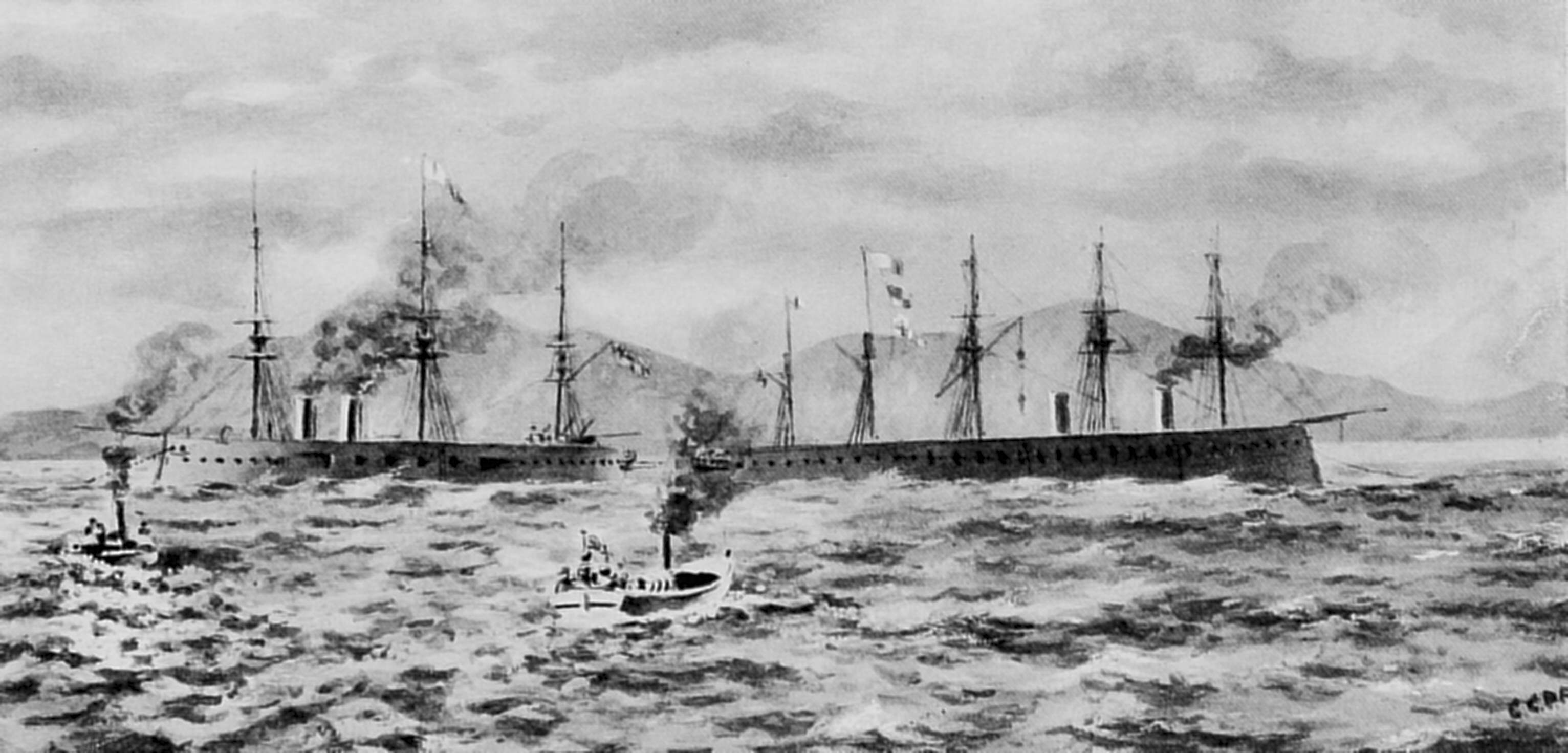
HMS Hercules (left) towing HMS Agincourt (right) off Pearl Rock; the grounding of the Agincourt led to Wellesley being court martialled and being relieved of his command

Promoted to rear admiral on 3 April 1863, Wellesley became Admiral Superintendent at Portsmouth in June 1865 and then Commander-in-Chief of the North America and West Indies Station, hoisting his flag in the ironclad frigate HMS Royal Alfred, in June 1869.

Promoted to vice admiral on 26 July 1869, Wellesley went on to be Commander-in-Chief of the Channel Squadron, hoisting his flag in the armoured frigate HMS Minotaur, in October 1870 but was relieved of that post by a court-martial after an incident in which the armoured frigate HMS Agincourt, which had been under his command at the time, ran aground at Pearl Rock off Gibraltar in July 1871. It was not until the fourth day after the incident that the central battery ironclad HMS Hercules commanded by Captain Lord Gilford, using full engines and hauling on the anchors, managed to pull HMS Agincourt free using two chains. After that Wellesley was made Commander-in-Chief of the North America and West Indies Station again, this time hoisting his flag in the central battery ironclad HMS Bellerophon, in September 1873.

Promoted to full admiral on 11 December 1875, Wellesley was appointed First Naval Lord in November 1877. In that capacity he secured a considerable increase in naval construction, for example on the Colossus-class battleships, although some of these ships were of doubtful quality. He retired in August 1879 and was advanced to Knight Commander of the Order of the Bath on 23 April 1880.

In retirement Wellesley was advanced to Knight Grand Cross of the Order of the Bath on 21 June 1887 and became a Commissioner of the Patriotic Fund in June 1888. He died at his home at Chester Square in London on 6 April 1901.

== Family ==
In 1853 Wellesley married Elizabeth Doughty Lukin (c.1816 - 1906); they had one daughter, Olivia Georgiana.

== See also ==
- O'Byrne, William Richard (1849). "Wellesley, George Greville" . A Naval Biographical Dictionary . John Murray – via Wikisource.

== Sources ==
- Fitzgerald, Penrose (1913). Memories of the Sea. London: Edward Arnold. ASIN B009YSMIH2.
- William Loney RN Career History

Military offices
Preceded by Sir Rodney Mundy	Commander-in-Chief, North America and West Indies Station; 1869–1870	Succeeded by Sir Edward Fanshawe
Preceded by Sir Hastings Yelverton	Commander-in-Chief, Channel Squadron; 1870–1871	Succeeded by Sir Geoffrey Hornby
Preceded by Sir Edward Fanshawe	Commander-in-Chief, North America and West Indies Station; 1873–1875	Succeeded by Sir Astley Key
Preceded by Sir Hastings Yelverton	First Naval Lord; 1877–1879	Succeeded by Sir Astley Key
