= Robert Hay-Drummond, 10th Earl of Kinnoull =

Scottish peer (1751–1804)

The Right Honourable The Earl of Kinnoull PC
- The Hay-Drummond coat of arms coat of arms

Lord Lyon King of Arms
- In office 1796–1804
- Preceded by: John Hooke-Campbell
- Succeeded by: Thomas Hay-Drummond

Personal details
- Born: 18 March 1751
- Died: 19 April 1804 (aged 53) Dupplin Castle
- Spouses: Julia Eyre (m. 1779; died 1780) Sarah Harley (m. 1781)
- Children: 4, including Thomas
- Parents: Robert Hay Drummond; Henrietta Auriol

Robert Auriol Hay-Drummond, 10th Earl of Kinnoull PC (18 March 1751 – 19 April 1804) was a Scottish peer and Lord Lyon King of Arms. His titles were Earl of Kinnoull, Viscount Dupplin and Lord Hay of Kinfauns in the Peerage of Scotland and Baron Hay of Pedwardine in the Peerage of Great Britain.

== Biography ==
Robert Auriol Hay-Drummond was the eldest son of the Most Rev. and Rt. Hon. Robert Hay Drummond, the Archbishop of York, and Henrietta Auriol. In 1739, his father Robert Hay took on the Drummond name and arms as heir of entail of his great-grandfather William, Viscount Strathallan.

Robert Hay-Drummond succeeded to the title of Earl of Kinnoull on 27 December 1787 on the death of his uncle, Thomas Hay.

From 1796, when he was sworn of the Privy Council, until his death in 1804, Lord Kinnoull served as Lord Lyon King of Arms. He was succeeded as Lord Lyon and in the earldom of Kinnoull by his son Thomas.

On 19 April 1779, Hay-Drummond married his first wife, Julia Eyre. On 8 June 1781, he married Sarah Harley, daughter and co-heiress of the Hon Thomas Harley MP, Lord Mayor of London.

== Marriage and issue ==
Hay-Drummond married Julia Eyre on 12 April 1779; she died 29 March 1780. On 3 June 1781, he married Sarah, fourth daughter of Right Hon. Thomas Harley, Lord Mayor of London. They had four children:

- Henrietta (23 August 1783 – 7 October 1854) - married Henry Drummond, grandson of Henry, Viscount Melville
- Thomas Robert (5 April 1785 – 18 February 1866)
- Francis John (17 September 1786 – 20 October 1810) - drowned in the River Earn
- Sarah Maria (21 June 1788 – 11 July 1874) - married the Rev. George Murray, Bishop of Rochester, nephew of the Duke of Atholl

Heraldic offices
Preceded by John Hooke-Campbell	Lord Lyon King of Arms; 1796–1804	Succeeded by Thomas Hay-Drummond
Peerage of Scotland
Preceded by Thomas Hay	Earl of Kinnoull; 1787–1804	Succeeded by Thomas Hay-Drummond
