= Joseph Ashe (Irish politician) =

MP for Trim, County Meath, from 1735 to 1760

Joseph Ashe (1707 at Ashfield, County Meath – ?) was an Irish politician and educated at Trinity College, Dublin. He was MP for Trim in County Meath from 1735 to 1760.
