= Garret Wesley, 1st Earl of Mornington =

Anglo-Irish politician and composer (1735–1781)

The Right Honourable The Earl of Mornington
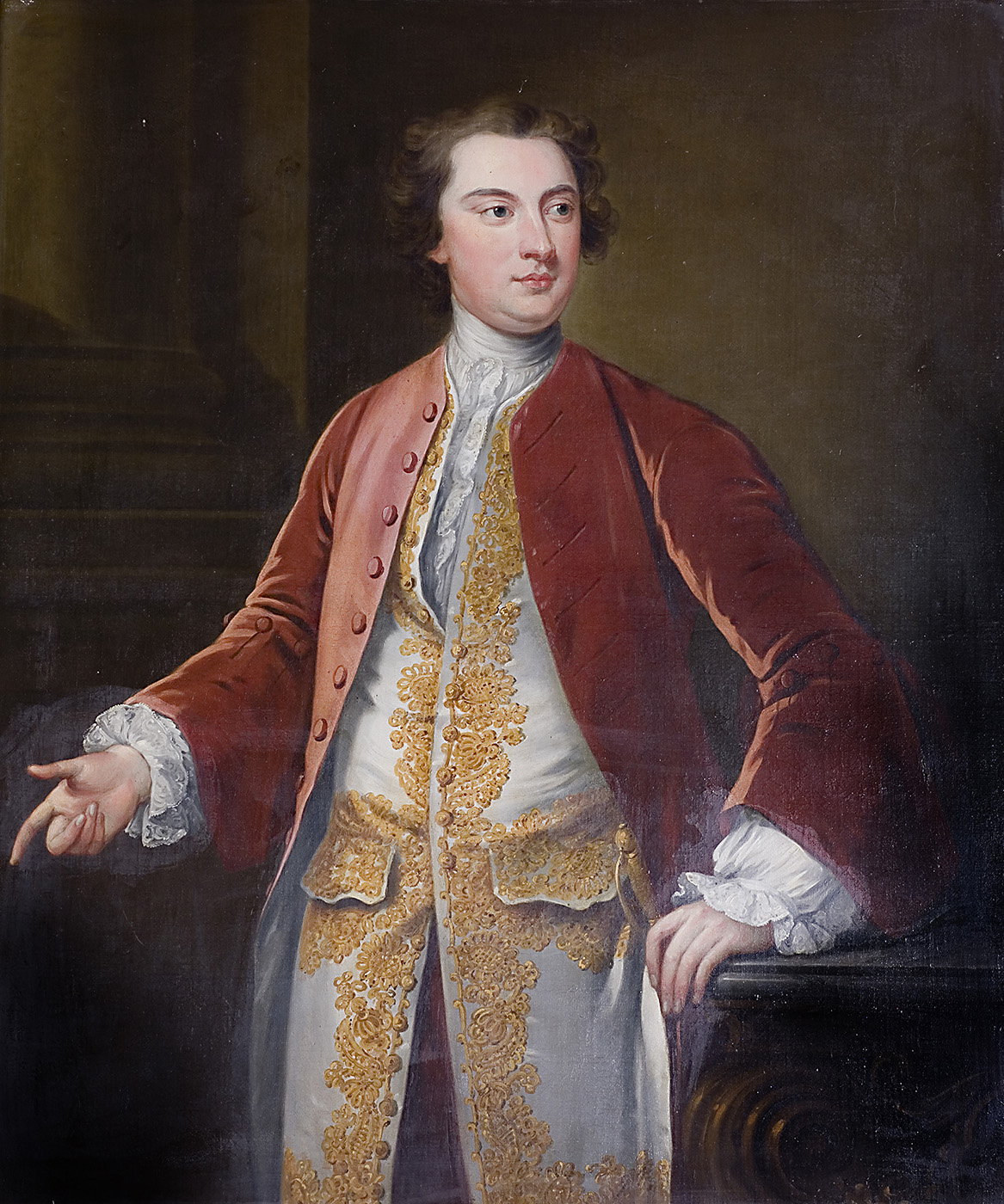
- Portrait of Mornington

Member of Parliament for Trim
- In office 1757–1758 Serving with Joseph Ashe
- Preceded by: Chichester Fortescue
- Succeeded by: William Francis Crosbie

Personal details
- Born: 19 July 1735 Dangan Castle, County Meath, Ireland
- Died: 22 May 1781 (aged 45)
- Resting place: Grosvenor Chapel, London, England
- Spouse: Anne Hill-Trevor (m. 1759)
- Relations: Henry Colley (grandfather)
- Children: Richard Wellesley, 1st Marquess Wellesley; Arthur Gerald Wesley; William Wellesley-Pole, 3rd Earl of Mornington; Francis Wesley; Lady Anne Culling Smith; Arthur Wellesley, 1st Duke of Wellington; Gerald Valerian Wellesley; Lady Mary Elizabeth Wesley; Henry Wellesley, 1st Baron Cowley
- Parents: Richard Wesley, 1st Baron Mornington (father); Elizabeth Sale (mother)
- Education: Trinity College Dublin

Garret Wesley, 1st Earl of Mornington (19 July 1735 – 22 May 1781) was an Anglo-Irish politician and composer and the father of a distinguished military commander and several politicians of Great Britain and Ireland.

== Early life ==
Wesley was born at the family estate of Dangan Castle, near Summerhill, a village near Trim in County Meath, Ireland. He was a son of Richard Wesley, 1st Baron Mornington (son of Henry Colley, MP), and Elizabeth Sale (a daughter of John Sale, Registrar of the Diocese of Dublin).

He was educated at Trinity College Dublin, and was elected its first Professor of Music in 1764. From early childhood he showed extraordinary talent on the violin, and soon began composing his own works. It was the future Duke of Wellington who, alone of his children, inherited something of his musical talent.

== Political career ==
Wesley represented Trim in the Irish House of Commons from 1757 until 1758, when he succeeded his father as 2nd Baron Mornington. In 1759 he was appointed Custos Rotulorum of Meath and in 1760, in recognition of his musical and philanthropic achievements, he was created Viscount Wellesley, of Dangan Castle in the County of Meath, and Earl of Mornington.

He was elected Grand Master of the Grand Lodge of Ireland in 1776, a post he held until the following year. Like his father, his mother-in-law Lady Dungannon, and two of his sons, he was careless with money, and his early death left the family exposed to financial embarrassment, leading ultimately to the decision in the nineteenth century to sell all their Irish estates.

== Musical compositions ==
As a composer, Lord Mornington is remembered chiefly for glees such as Here in cool grot (lyrics by William Shenstone) and some Anglican chant. But he also composed some large-scale music such as the five-act opera Caractacus (libretto by William Mason), first performed at the Theatre Royal, Smock Alley, Dublin on 26 March 1764, and the Ode for the Installation of the Duke of Bedford at Trinity College Dublin, 9 September 1768, for choir and orchestra, of which only an orchestral march survives.

In music he is also remembered as one of co-founders, with Kane O'Hara and Francis Ireland, of a Musical Academy in late 1757, which lasted about twenty years. This was a concert-giving society for amateurs where he directed the choir and orchestra.

== Personal life ==
Lord Mornington married Anne Hill-Trevor, eldest daughter of the banker Arthur Hill-Trevor, 1st Viscount Dungannon, and his wife Anne Stafford, on 6 February 1759. His godmother, the famous diarist Mary Delany, said the marriage was happy, despite his lack of financial sense and her "want of judgment". They had nine children, most of whom were historically significant, including:

- Richard Wellesley, 1st Marquess Wellesley (1760–1842), married firstly Hyacinthe-Gabrielle Roland, daughter of Pierre Roland, in 1794; married secondly Marianne Caton, daughter of Richard Caton, in 1825
- Arthur Gerald Wesley (d. 1768)
- William Wellesley-Pole, 3rd Earl of Mornington (1763–1845), married Katherine Forbes, daughter of Admiral John Forbes and maternal granddaughter of William Capell, 3rd Earl of Essex, in 1784
- Francis Wesley (1767–1770)
- Lady Anne Wesley (1768–1844), married firstly Henry FitzRoy, younger son of Charles FitzRoy, 1st Baron Southampton (descendant of an illegitimate son of Charles II); married secondly Charles Culling Smith
- Arthur Wellesley, 1st Duke of Wellington (1769–1852), who married Catherine Pakenham, daughter of Edward Pakenham, 2nd Baron Longford, in 1806
- Gerald Valerian Wellesley (1770–1848), married Lady Emily Cadogan, eldest daughter of Charles Cadogan, 1st Earl Cadogan
- Lady Mary Elizabeth Wesley (1772–1794)
- Henry Wellesley, 1st Baron Cowley (1773–1847), married firstly Lady Charlotte Cadogan, second daughter of the 1st Earl Cadogan, in 1803; divorced by Act of Parliament in 1810, and married secondly Lady Georgiana Cecil, daughter of James Cecil, 1st Marquess of Salisbury, in 1816

Four of Lord Mornington's five sons were created peers in the peerages of Great Britain and the United Kingdom. The Barony of Wellesley (held by the Marquess Wellesley) and the Barony of Maryborough are now extinct, whilst the Dukedom of Wellington and Barony of Cowley are extant. The Earldom of Mornington is held by the Dukes of Wellington, and the Barons Cowley have since been elevated to be Earls Cowley.

== Legacy ==
Four streets in Camden Town, which formed part of the estate of his son-in-law Henry FitzRoy, were named Mornington Crescent, Place, Street and Terrace after him. Of these, the first has since become famous as the name of a London Underground station.

Parliament of Ireland
Preceded by Chichester Fortescue	Member of Parliament for Trim; 1757–1758; With: Joseph Ashe	Succeeded by William Francis Crosbie
Masonic offices
Preceded by The Earl of Belvedere	Grand Master of the Grand Lodge of Ireland; 1776 – 1777	Succeeded by The Duke of Leinster
Peerage of Ireland
New creation	Earl of Mornington; 1760 – 1781	Succeeded by Richard Wellesley
Preceded by Richard Wesley	Baron Mornington; 1758 – 1781	Succeeded by Richard Wellesley
