= Walter Hadow =

English cricketer

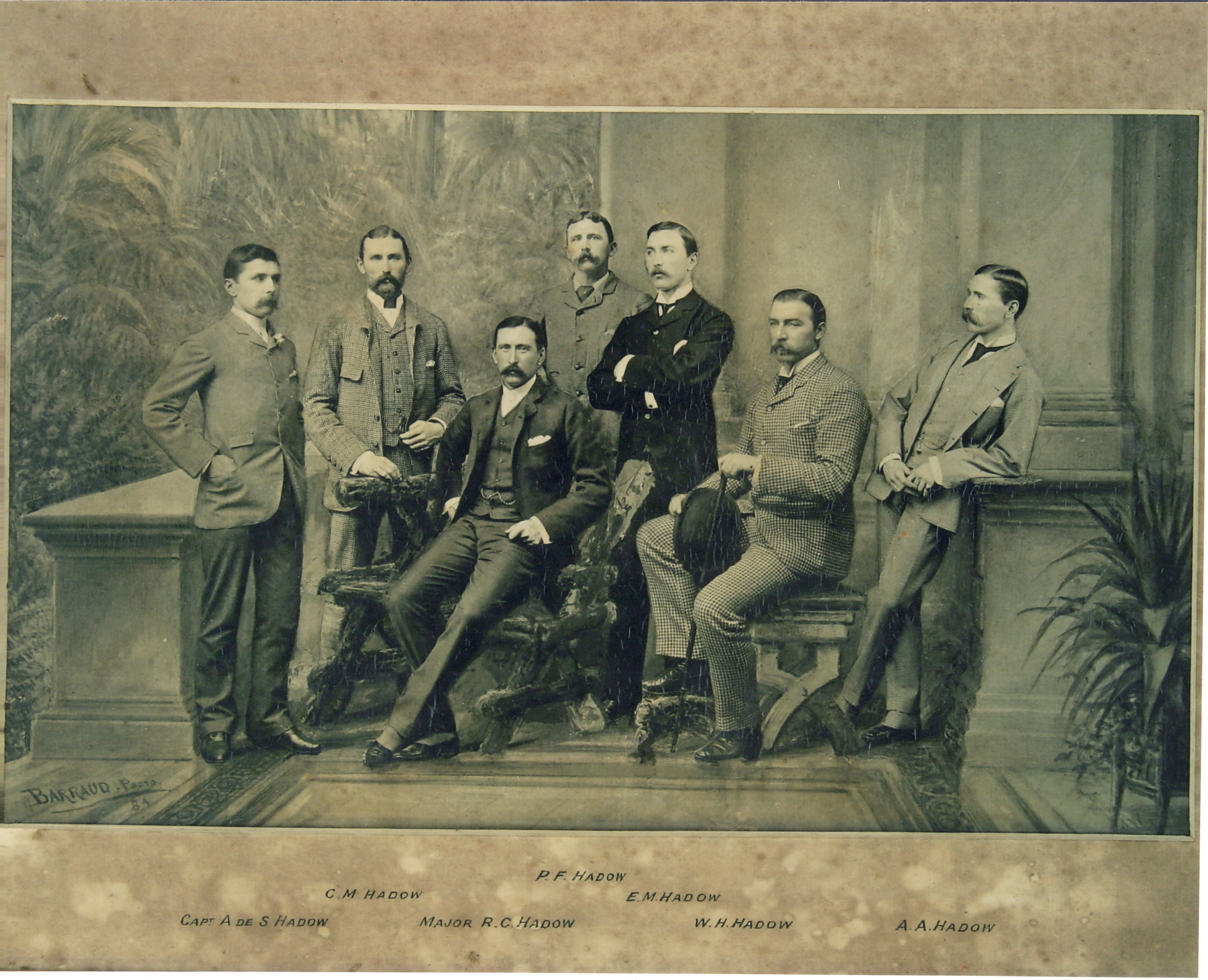
The Hadow family. Walter Hadow is seated second right.

Walter Henry Hadow (25 September 1849 – 15 September 1898) was an English first-class cricketer, who had amateur status.

Hadow was a noted schoolboy cricketer at Harrow, mentioned by Harry Altham as one of "a striking array of school batsmen". He went on to Brasenose College, Oxford, where he continued to be a noted player and Altham described him as one of "a steady stream of exceptional batsmen from the ranks of the Universities".

An all-rounder, he was a right-handed batsman and a right-arm roundarm slow bowler who made 97 first-class appearances from 1869 to 1884. He represented several teams but mostly Middlesex, Oxford University and Marylebone Cricket Club (MCC). Hadow scored 3,071 runs at an average of 19.56 with a highest innings of 217, one of two centuries in addition to ten half-centuries. He held 84 catches and took 139 wickets at an average of 16.84 with a best analysis of 8/35. He took five wickets in an innings on nine occasions and three times took ten in a match.

Below first-class he played at county level for Brecknockshire and, in 1868 and 1869, for Shropshire.

Born at Regent's Park, London in 1849, Hadow died aged 48 at Dupplin Castle, Perthshire, his father-in-law's home, on 15 September 1898. At the time of his death, he was Her Majesty's Commissioner for Prisons for Scotland. His wife was Lady Constance Hay, daughter of George Hay-Drummond, 12th Earl of Kinnoull, and they had two sons and a daughter.

== Bibliography ==
- Altham, H.S. (1962). A History of Cricket, Volume 1 (to 1914). George Allen & Unwin.
