= Lady Anne Culling Smith =

Anglo-Irish aristocrat

- Born: 13 March 1768
- Died: 16 December 1844 (aged 76); Hampton Court
- Spouses: Henry FitzRoy; Charles Culling Smith
- Issue: Anne FitzRoy; Georgiana Somerset, Marchioness of Worcester; Emily Somerset, Duchess of Beaufort; Frederick Culling Smith
- Father: Garret Wesley, 1st Earl of Mornington
- Mother: Hon. Anne Hill-Trevor

Lady Anne Culling Smith (née Wellesley, previously FitzRoy; 13 March 1768 – 16 December 1844) was an Anglo-Irish aristocrat, and the sister of Arthur Wellesley, 1st Duke of Wellington. She was the daughter of the 1st Earl of Mornington, and Anne Wellesley, Countess of Mornington, daughter of Arthur Hill-Trevor, 1st Viscount Dungannon.

On 7 January 1790 she married the Hon. Henry FitzRoy, son of Charles FitzRoy, 1st Baron Southampton. They had two daughters:

- Anne Caroline FitzRoy, died 16 December 1835
- Georgiana Frederica FitzRoy (3 October 1792 – 11 May 1821), married 25 July 1814 Henry Somerset, Marquess of Worcester, with two daughters.

FitzRoy died on 19 March 1794 in Lisbon due to consumption. Anne's brother Henry came down to Lisbon to bring her back to England. However, on their way back, their ship was captured by a French frigate and the siblings were taken prisoners. In January 1795, Anne was freed. Anne remarried on 2 August 1799 to Charles Culling Smith, having two more children:

- Emily Frances Culling Smith (3 March 1800 – 2 October 1889), married 29 June 1822 her half-sister's widower Lord Worcester, who succeeded his father as 7th Duke of Beaufort in 1835. They had one son and six daughters.
- Frederick William Culling Smith (died 19 June 1828), a godson of the Duke of York. He was made a Page of Honour on 13 March 1812 and commissioned as a Cornet in the 2nd Dragoon Guards on 22 April 1819. He transferred into the Coldstream Guards as an Ensign on 18 January 1820 and reached the rank of Lieutenant in that regiment before promotion to the Royal Horse Guards as a captain on 2 January 1823. On 1 August 1826 he was promoted to the rank of Major of Infantry on the unattached list, and joined the 80th Regiment of Foot on 17 January 1828. He died at Malta later that year, aged twenty-six.

On 25 July 1814 Lady Anne's daughter Georgiana Frederica FitzRoy (born 3 October 1792) married Henry Somerset, Marquess of Worcester, who had served the Duke of Wellington as an aide-de-camp during the Peninsular War. Lady Worcester was Wellington's favourite niece, and her death in great pain ("I did not know death could hurt so much") on 11 May 1821 was a great blow to him and all her friends. On 29 June 1822 Lord Worcester married Lady Anne's other daughter Emily Frances (born 3 March 1800), greatly to the annoyance of Wellington, who was never close to his sister afterwards. On 23 November 1835, Emily Frances became Duchess of Beaufort.

Lady Anne Culling Smith died on 16 December 1844, at Hampton Court.
