= Charles Culling Smith =

British politician and courtier

Charles Culling Smith (c. 1775 – 26 May 1853) was a British politician and courtier, most noted as the brother-in-law of the Duke of Wellington.

== Early life ==
Culling Smith was born in c. 1775. He was the son of Charles Smith, Governor of Madras, and nephew of Sir Culling Smith, 1st Baronet. His grandfather, Thomas Smith, Esq. of Hadley, Middlesex, was a prosperous London merchant.

== Career ==
Culling Smith's brother-in-law, the Marquess Wellesley, became Foreign Secretary in the Tory government of Spencer Perceval in 1809, and Culling Smith was appointed Under-Secretary of State for Foreign Affairs on 13 December that year, serving until 27 February 1812. On 1 June 1812 he was one of the Esquires to his brother-in-law the Earl of Wellington at the latter's installation (by proxy) as a Knight Companion of the Order of the Bath.

Culling Smith served as an equerry to the Duke of York, and was present in that capacity at the funeral of Queen Charlotte on 8 December 1818, while his son was there as Page of Honour. On 14 August 1820 Culling Smith and his wife, son, daughter and step-daughters were among the mourners at the funeral of the Duchess of York. His last service as equerry was at the Duke of York's funeral on 20 January 1827.

On 13 March 1827 Culling Smith was made one of the Commissioners of the Board of Customs, but he continued to attend state occasions including the funeral of the Duke of Gloucester on 11 December 1834 and the Duke of Wellington on 18 November 1852.

== Personal life ==
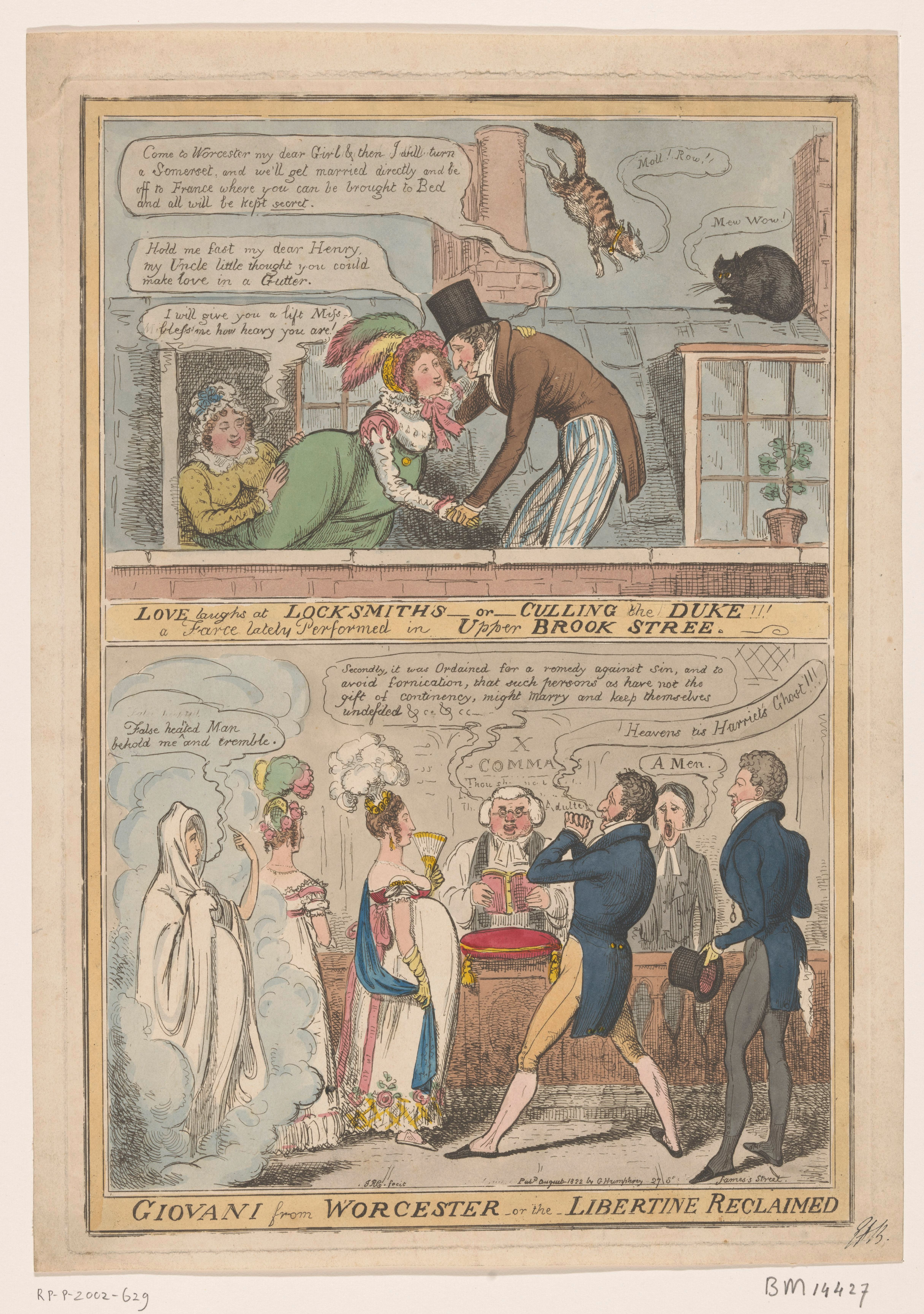
'Love laughs at locksmiths-or-culling the duke! A farce lately performed in Upper Brook Street.' Print satirising Lord Worcester's marriage to Culling Smith's daughter, by Isaac Robert Cruikshank, 1822.

On 2 August 1799 he married Lady Anne FitzRoy (1768–1844), widow of the Hon. Henry FitzRoy (fourth son of Charles FitzRoy, 1st Baron Southampton) and only daughter of Garret Wesley, 1st Earl of Mornington. By this marriage he gained two stepdaughters:

- Anne Caroline FitzRoy (died 1835)
- Georgiana Frederica FitzRoy (1792–1821), who married Henry Somerset, Marquess of Worcester, in 1814.

His marriage to Lady Anne produced a further two children, a daughter and a son:

- Emily Frances Culling Smith (1800–1889), who married her half-sister's widower Lord Worcester (who succeeded his father as 7th Duke of Beaufort in 1835) in 1822. They had one son and six daughters.
- Frederick William Culling Smith (c. 1802–1828), a godson of the Duke of York. He was made a Page of Honour on 13 March 1812 and commissioned as a cornet in the 2nd Dragoon Guards on 22 April 1819. He transferred into the Coldstream Guards as an ensign on 18 January 1820 and reached the rank of lieutenant in that regiment before promotion to the Royal Horse Guards as a captain on 2 January 1823. On 1 August 1826 he was promoted to the rank of major of infantry on the unattached list, and joined the 80th Regiment of Foot on 17 January 1828. He died at Malta later that year, aged twenty-six.

Culling Smith and Lady Anne lived in a grace-and-favour residence at Apartment 8, Hampton Court Palace.
