= Rachel Bourchier, Countess of Bath =

1656 miniature portrait of Lady Rachel Fane, by David des Granges (1611–1675), Fitzwilliam Museum, Cambridge

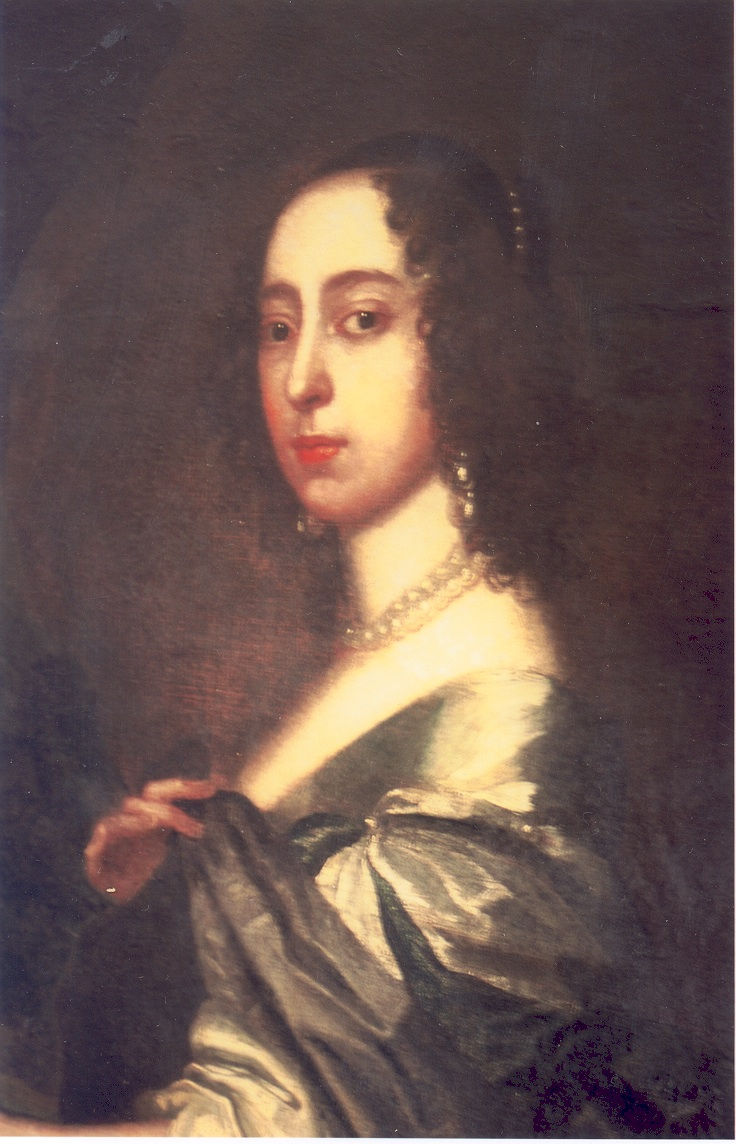
The Dowager Countess of Bath, later Countess of Middlesex

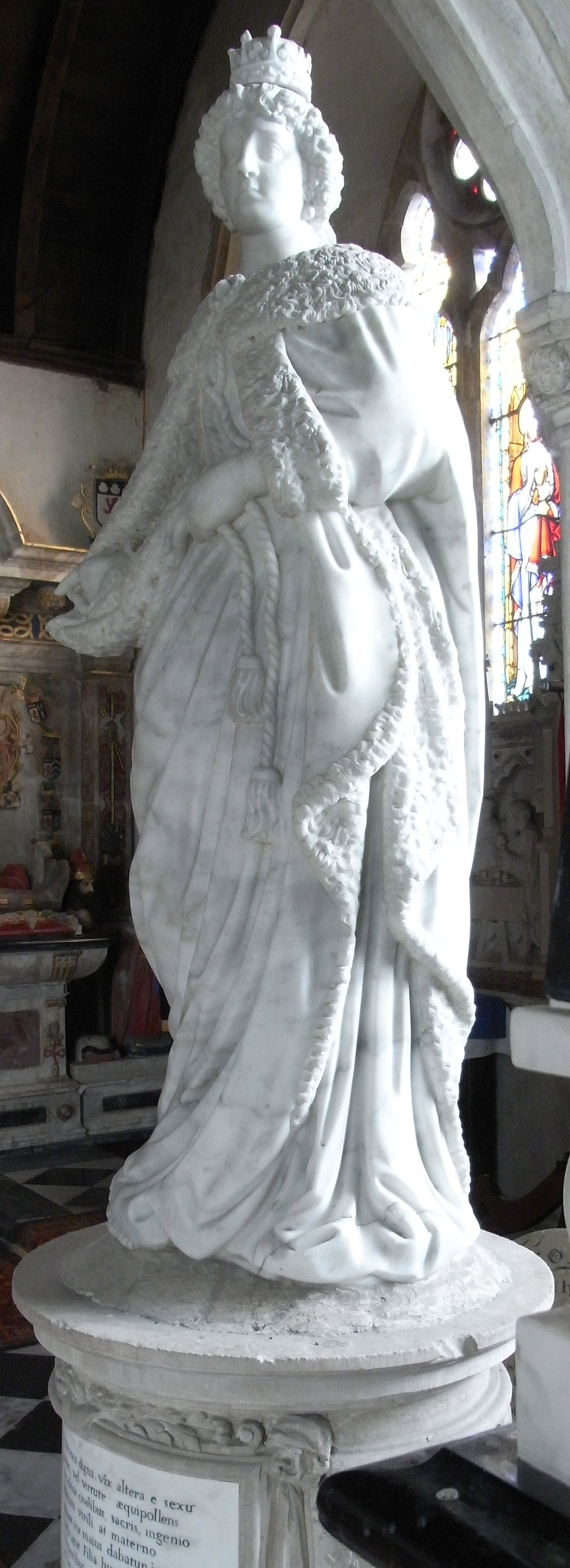
Marble statue of Rachel, Countess of Bath, St Peter's Church, Tawstock

Rachel Bourchier, Countess of Bath (Note: Alternatively Rachael) (née Fane; 28 January 1613 – 11 November 1680), wife of Henry Bourchier, 5th Earl of Bath (1587–1654), was an English noblewoman and writer, best known for her activities during the English Civil War.

== Origins ==
She was born at Mereworth Castle in Kent, the fifth daughter of Francis Fane, 1st Earl of Westmorland by his wife Mary Mildmay, a daughter of Sir Anthony Mildmay of Apethorpe Hall in Northamptonshire, where Rachel grew up. Rachel's brother, Mildmay Fane, 2nd Earl of Westmorland, a poet and dramatist, was close to King Charles I, who became a godfather to Fane's son in 1635. Another of Rachel's brothers was Colonel George Fane, who also supported the Royalist cause.

== Youth and writing ==
In her youth, Rachel Fane wrote masques for performance at family entertainments. These include A New Year's gift to my Lady, a poem addressed to her mother, which refers to the year 1627 by reference to the calculations of James Ussher and Thomas Lydiat.

Other pieces, included in one of Rachel Fane's notebooks, include May Masque of 1627, possibly a Christmas or twelfth night masque, another is known as the "Wishing Chair Entertainment". Speeches in The Wishing Chair address Rachel's mother, Lady Westmorland, and the performance may have been conceived as an all-female event. The chair is brought on stage by Puck, the seasons and shepherds dance in turns. At the finale, Night brings sleep.

A fragment of a tragicomedy features a Duchess who asks her gentlewomen about the progress of embroidering a petticoat, and gives orders for preserving fruit with sugar. She receives news of the Duke's death. The text ends abruptly and Rachel Fane noted "I lost the rest". Another fragment discusses a play involving Robin Goodfellow and Nobody.

The "May Masque" includes pastoral elements which would have been dramatised with props from the Apethorpe estate farms. These masques were either performed in the Long Gallery at Apethorpe, or the older Great Hall.

Around the time her masques were performed, Rachel Fane made a translation of a section of the French romance, Amadis de Gaul, which survives with some of her other notebooks at the Kent History and Library Centre, Maidstone.

== Marriages ==
=== First marriage ===
On 13 December 1638, at the age of 25, in the church of St Bartholomew the Great in the City of London, she married the 50 year-old Henry Bourchier, 5th Earl of Bath (1587–1654) of Tawstock Court in Devon. Several of her account books survive. Rachel bought furnishings for their houses at Tawstock and Lincoln's Inn Fields and pictures from George Geldorp. From 1640, she had a servant of African origin who was recorded in her accounts as "James the blackamore". He may have worked as a cook.

By 1642, during the Civil War, the Earl of Bath was active in the Royalist cause, and wrote to his wife from York and London about the progress of the War. In December 1642 the House of Lords ordered Thomas Browne to return the horses he had commandeered from Rachel on behalf of Robert Devereux, 3rd Earl of Essex, the Parliamentary commander. They had no children, although in 1663 she became the guardian of her nephew, Sir Henry Fane (d.1706), the only child of her brother George Fane.

Following Bourchier's death in 1654, Rachel commissioned a striking monument in his memory, which survives in the south aisle chapel of St Peter's Church, Tawstock. Opinions vary as to its artistic merit, with Hoskins (1954) calling it "massive and ugly", while J. H. Marland deemed it "almost unequalled in singularity and absurdity". It is constructed in black and white marble, with four dogs supporting a sarcophagus on their shoulders with a black obelisk at each corner.

=== Second marriage ===
Six months after the earl's death, she married Lionel Cranfield, 3rd Earl of Middlesex (1625–1674), who was 12 years her junior, a Gentleman of the Bedchamber to King Charles II. The marriage was not a happy one and the couple lived apart from 1661 onwards. After Cranfield's death in 1674, Rachel did not remarry.

== Monuments ==
The life-size white marble statue of Rachel Fane, sculpted by Balthasar Burman (son of Thomas Burman), which survives in St Peter's Church, Tawstock, is a copy of the statue of Mary Cavendish (1556–1632) the wife of Gilbert Talbot, 7th Earl of Shrewsbury, sculpted in 1671 by Thomas Burman at the cost of her nephew William Cavendish, 1st Duke of Newcastle (1592–1676), which stands in a niche on the Shrewsbury Tower of the Second Court (which she partly financed) of St John's College, Cambridge.

Sir Anthony van Dyck painted two portraits of Rachel, one prior to her first marriage, which survives, and another in 1641, for which she paid him £20, of which only an engraving survives, by Pierre Lombart. A miniature of the countess by David des Granges is held by the Fitzwilliam Museum, Cambridge.

In a 1670 work by Sir Kenelm Digby, a recipe for syllabub appears, attributed to the countess.
