= George Bourchier (Elizabethan soldier) =

Canting arms of Bourchier: Argent, a cross engrailed gules between four water bougets sable

Sir George Bourchier (c.1535 – 1605) was an English soldier who fought and settled in Ireland. He was a member of the Privy Council of Ireland, and a Member of the Irish Parliament.

== Biography ==
George Bourchier was the third son of John Bourchier, 2nd Earl of Bath by his second wife Eleanor Manners. He went to western Ireland as a captain in 1570 and remained there throughout the Desmond Rebellions; in 1573 he was seized by James FitzMaurice FitzGerald, he was surrendered after Essex met the Earl of Desmond near Waterford that July; he was knighted by Sir William Drury, Lord Justice of Ireland, in September 1579. He continued to command forces, and was elected Member for King's County 1585–86; was Master of the Ordnance (Ireland) 1592; a Privy Councillor (Ireland); and was sometime High Commissioner for Ecclesiastical Causes. He died on 24 September 1605.

In 1589 he was granted 12,800 acres (52 km^{2}) of county Limerick.

He was one of the seven signatories of a letter from the Irish Executive to the Privy Council in England (dated 4 November 1591) which inclosed the petition of the Mayor and Corporation of Dublin offering the 28-acre (110,000 m^{2}) All Hallows site for the foundation of a university (S.P.O., Ireland, Elizabeth vol. 1611–8). Trinity College Dublin was subsequently founded on 3 March 1592. He is listed, 11 March 1591/2, as an original Founder and Benefactor having donated £30, twice.

== Family ==
George Bourchier married Martha Howard (c. 1555–1598), daughter of William, 1st Lord Howard of Effingham by Margaret Gamage. Her brother was the Lord High Admiral Charles Lord Howard of Effingham.

Two of their sons, Charles (d. 17 September 1584) and Frederick-Philip (d. 8 March 1587), are buried in Kilkenny's cathedral of St. Canice.

The first three sons died young. The fourth one, Sir John Bourchier, Kt, (knighted 24 March 1610/11), of the manor of Clare, co. Armagh, died 25 March 1614 having been MP for county Armagh, 1613-14.

In 1614, therefore, Henry, the fifth son, inherited in Ireland from both his father and brother over 18,000 acres (73 km^{2}). When he became 5th Earl of Bath on the death of his cousin the 4th Earl (aged 47) in March 1636/37, he added Tawstock and 36 manors in Devon and Somerset to his name.
