= Matthew de Renzy =

German customs official and Gaelic scholar

- Born: 1577; Cologne, Holy Roman Empire
- Died: 29 August 1634 (aged 56–57)
- Occupations: Customs official and Gaelic scholar

Sir Matthew de Renzy (1577 – 29 August 1634), or Sir Matthew de Rentsi, was a German customs official in Ireland, and Gaelic scholar.

== Biography ==
De Renzy born in 1577 in Cologne. De Renzy was a descendant of the Albania's national hero, Skanderbeg.

Sir Matthew was an officer of the customs in Ireland. In 1623 he corresponded with the lord-treasurer Middlesex about revenue business (Hist. MSS. Comm. 4th Rep. App. pp. 284, 302). On 30 January 1628–9 he wrote to Middlesex that there was a plot among the Leinster catholics to massacre the English (ib. p. 290). He received grants of land from James I, and also purchased property in King's County, where he made considerable improvements. He died on 29 August 1634. Clobemon Hall, Ferns, was held by his descendants until recent times. A monument still standing in St. Peter's Church, Athlone, was erected by his son Matthew one year after his death. According to the inscription, he was "a great traveller and general linguist, and kept correspondence with most nations in many weighty affairs; and in three years gave great perfection to this nation by composing a grammar, dictionary, and chronicle in the Irish tongue: in accounts most expert, and exceeding all others to his great applause." Diligent search has been made for the works mentioned, but without result, and if they are extant it is probably in some foreign library.
