= The May Masque at Apethorpe =

The May Masque was probably performed in the long gallery at Apethorpe.

The May Masque at Apethorpe was an entertainment written by Rachel Fane and performed at Apethorpe Hall in 1627.

== Theatre at Apethorpe ==
Rachel Fane was a daughter of Francis Fane, 1st Earl of Westmorland and Mary Mildmay Fane, Countess of Westmorland. There was a tradition of Christmas and New Year entertainments and other private theatricals at their home in Northamptonshire. Around this time, Rachel's mother, the Countess of Westmorland, kept in touch with her daughter, Grace, Countess of Home, in Scotland, describing life at Apethorpe in her letters.

== The manuscript ==
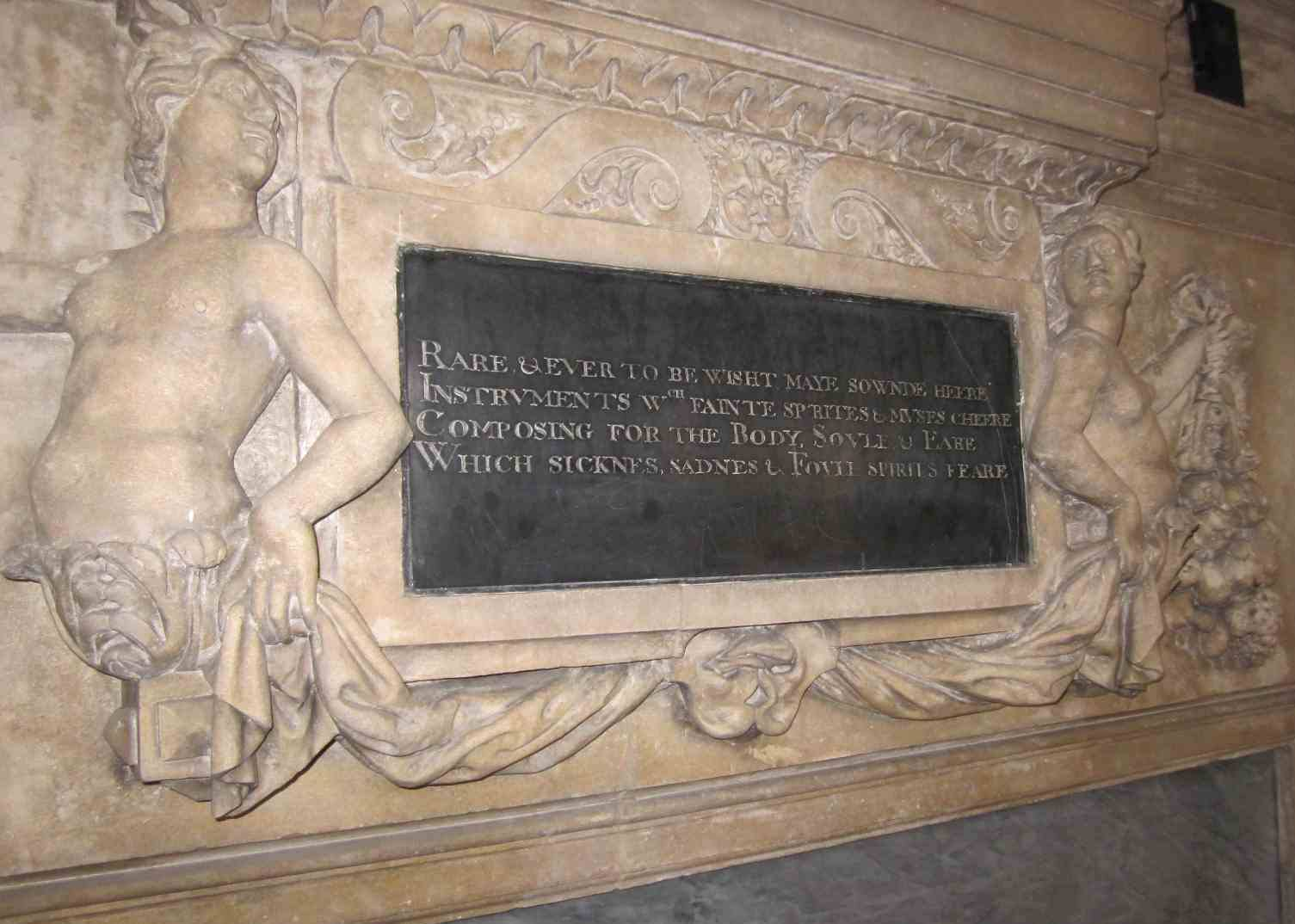
Mantlepiece in the long gallery at Apethorpe.

Rachel Fane copied some details or excerpts into a green manuscript notebook, including The May Masque. Internal evidence suggests she wrote The May Masque for performance with her siblings in 1627 when she was about 13 or 14 years old. The manuscript includes a short Christmas Prologue, The Wishing Chair entertainment, and other items.

The Wishing Chair entertainment is addressed to Rachel Fane's mother, the Countess of Westmorland. Marion O'Connor suggests that the Earl of Westmorland was either absent from Apethorpe, or that the original masque was written for performance shortly after his death in 1629.

== Performance ==
Lady Rachel Fane, 1656, by David des Granges (1611–1675), Fitzwilliam Museum

The May Masque includes pastoral elements which would have been dramatised with props from the Apethorpe estate farms. The masques were either performed in the Long Gallery at Apethorpe, or the older Great Hall, spaces which still exist. The audience included Rachel's parents, other family members, and presumably guests at the house.

In the manuscript, the text of the masque is preceded by a cast list which includes Rachel Fane's brothers and sisters, and others who may have been the children of local people, estate workers, and tenants.

== Summary ==
A jester and a shepherd set up a maypole and dance a Morris. The jester presents gifts to the audience. Francis Fane is handed a book, upside-down, as a warning against too much study. Rachel's sister-in-law, Grace Thornhurst, Lady Despencer, is pregnant, and a stage direction indicates that the jester addressed "her great belly". Sara Voisin, the Huguenot granddaughter of Henri Estienne, is given a cowslip "sprung from April showers".

The shepherd packs the maypole away. A nymph in a rich petticoat, waistcoat, and scarf, with a garland of flowers on her head, brings in a perfuming pan as a harbinger of Venus. Venus is persuaded to enter the refreshed room and dances a "canary". Urania summons the nymphs of woods and streams as "A flower of May is sprung today". They dance a dance of Rachel Fane's making.
