= Lionel Cranfield, 1st Earl of Middlesex =

English merchant and politician (1575–1645)

Lionel Cranfield 1st Earl of Middlesex
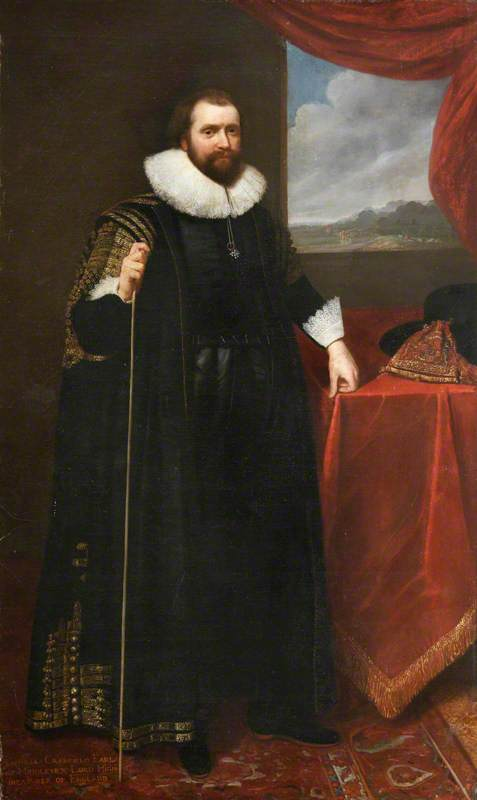

Lord High Treasurer
- In office 1621 – 25 April 1624
- Preceded by: Henry Montagu, 1st Earl of Manchester
- Succeeded by: James Ley, 1st Earl of Marlborough

Personal details
- Born: 1575 London, England
- Died: 6 August 1645
- Spouse(s): Elizabeth Sheppard; Anne Brett
- Children: Martha Cranfield, Countess of Monmouth; Elizabeth Cranfield, Lady Sheffield Countess of Mulgrave; Mary Cranfield; Gertrude Howard; James Cranfield, 2nd Earl of Middlesex; Frances Cranfield, Countess of Dorset; Lionel Cranfield, 3rd Earl of Middlesex; Edward Cranfield; Susanna Cranfield
- Occupation: mercer

Lionel Cranfield, 1st Earl of Middlesex (1575 – 6 August 1645) was an English merchant and politician. He sat in the House of Commons between 1614 and 1622 when he was raised to the peerage as Baron Cranfield.

== Life ==
He was the second son of Thomas Cranfield, a mercer at London, and his wife Martha Randill, the daughter and heiress of Vincent Randill of Sutton-at-Hone, Kent. He was apprenticed to Richard Sheppard, a mercer in London and went into partnership with him in around 1599. He was introduced to King James I and VI of England and Scotland by Lord Northampton, and entered the Royal service in 1605.

Cranfield was appointed Receiver-General of rents and revenues from royal lands in Dorset and Somerset by letters patent in 1605. This included the manors in the jointure lands given to Anne of Denmark. Much of the work was done by Randolph Baron, Sheriff of Bath, who served as deputy collector, and by clerks employed in London. A part of the income was used to pay the keepers of Portland Castle and Sandsfoot Castle. Some of Cranfield's receivership papers survive.

In 1613, he was knighted and was appointed Surveyor-General of Customs. He was elected Member of Parliament for Hythe in 1614. In 1616 he became one of the Masters of Requests, briefly in 1618 Keeper of the Great Wardrobe and in 1619 Master of the Court of Wards and Liveries and Chief Commissioner of the Navy. As Keeper of the Wardrobe he supervised the spending of £20,000 on the funeral of Anne of Denmark and made an inventory of her jewels.

He was elected MP for Arundel in 1621. Cranfield was responsible for many economies in the public service, and his business acumen was very useful to the King. He took part in the attack on Lord St Alban in 1621, and although, contrary to general expectation, he did not succeed him as Lord Chancellor, he was created Baron Cranfield, of Cranfield in the County of Bedford, in July of that year. In 1621 also he became Lord High Treasurer and in September 1622 was created Earl of Middlesex.

Cranfield lost his positions and influence shortly afterwards because he opposed the projected war with Spain, and had incurred the hostility of the Prince of Wales and the Duke of Buckingham. Impeached by the House of Commons for corruption, he was found guilty by the House of Lords in May 1624 and was sentenced to lose all his offices, to pay a heavy fine and to be imprisoned during the King's pleasure. However, he was released from prison in a few days, was pardoned in the following year, and was restored to his seat in the House of Lords in 1640. Middlesex died on 6 August 1645.

Cranfield's homes included Chelsea House, which he bought in 1619 and improved employing the services of Inigo Jones and Nicholas Stone, and Copthall in Essex. Furnishings were supplied by the upholsterers Oliver Browne and John Baker who also supplied the royal court and wardrobe, and painted and gilded by Thomas Capp. These included a suite of furnishings for Anne Brett's "lying-in" at Chelsea in 1621 with a cradle with a canopy of crimson damask for James Cranfield in 1621. Furniture from Copthall was taken to Knole in 1701.

== Family ==
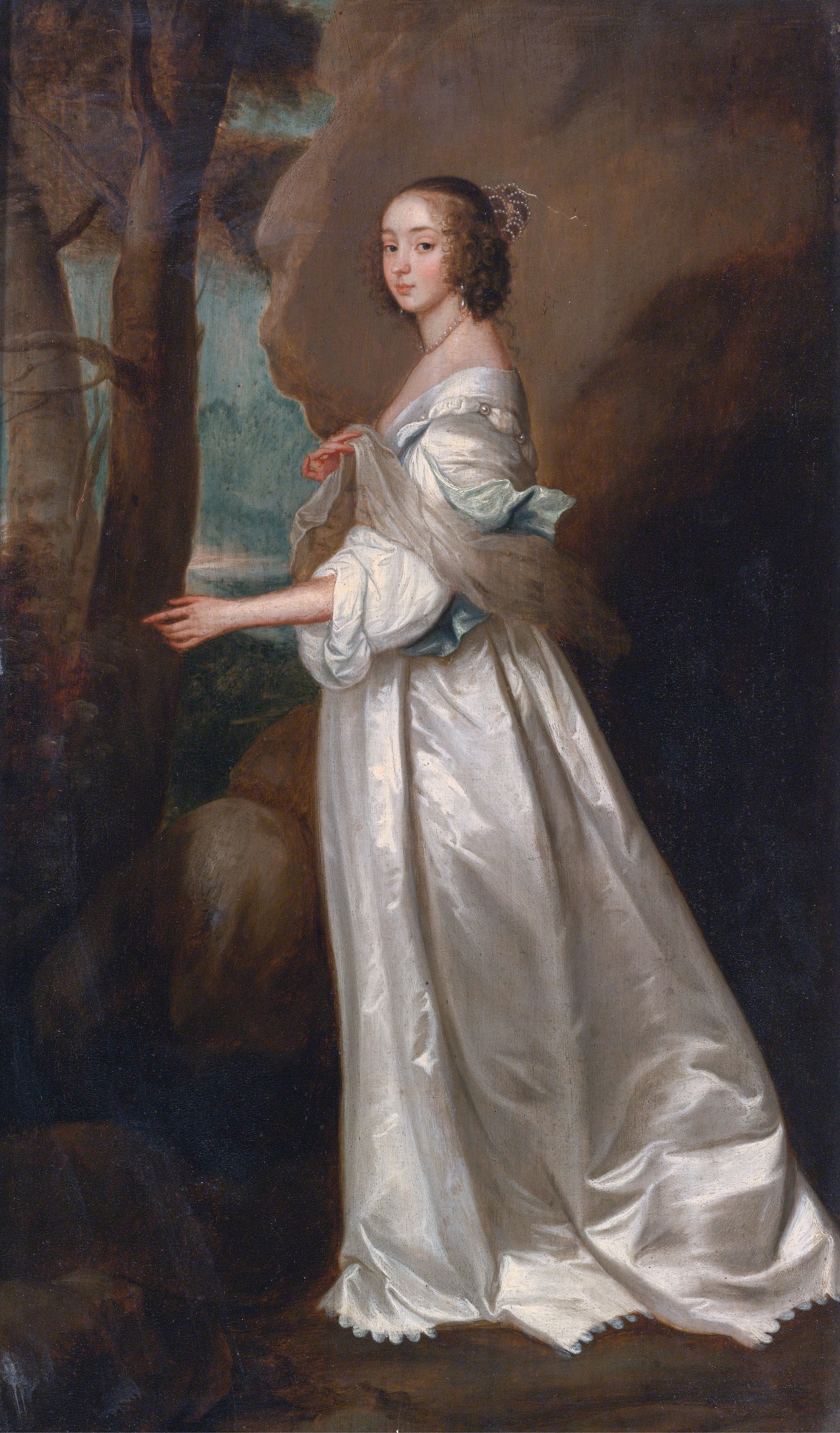
Frances Cranfield (1622–1687)

Cranfield married Richard Sheppard's daughter Elizabeth in 1599. His second wife was Anne Brett (died 1670), a cousin of Buckingham's mother, whom he married somewhat reluctantly in 1621 in order to ensure Buckingham's support. Cranfield unsuccessfully tried to promote Anne's brother Arthur Brett as a royal favourite.

His heir was James Cranfield, 2nd Earl of Middlesex (1621–1651), who succeeded him as 2nd Earl and was a partisan of the parliamentary party during the English Civil War. The 2nd Earl was succeeded by his brother, Lionel, who died without issue in October 1674, thereafter the Earldom of Middlesex and Barony of Cranfield became extinct. The 1st Earl's youngest surviving daughter, Frances, married Lord Buckhurst, later 5th Earl of Dorset, and their eldest son, Charles, by then Lord Buckhurst, was created Earl of Middlesex in 1675. Two years later he succeeded as 6th Earl of Dorset, and this Earldom of Middlesex was held by the Earls and then Dukes of Dorset until 1843, when it became extinct.

Children by his first wife Elizabeth Sheppard (d. 1617):

- Martha Cranfield, Countess of Monmouth (b. 1601)
- Elizabeth Cranfield, Lady Sheffield Countess of Mulgrave (b. 1608)
- Mary Cranfield (1610–1636)

Children by his second wife, Anne Brett (d. 1670):

- James Cranfield, 2nd Earl of Middlesex (1621–1651)
- Frances Cranfield, Countess of Dorset (1622–1687)
- Lionel Cranfield, 3rd Earl of Middlesex (1625–1674)
- Edward Cranfield (b. c. 1628)
- Susanna Cranfield (c. 1631–1636)

== Memorial ==
There is a memorial to him in the Chapel of St Benedict at Westminster Abbey.

Parliament of England
| Preceded by Sir Norton Knatchbull; Christopher Toldervey | Member of Parliament for Hythe; 1614; With: Sir Richard Smythe | Succeeded by Sir Peter Heyman; Dr Richard Zouche |
| Preceded by Sir Henry Spiller; Edward Morley | Member of Parliament for Arundel; 1621–1622; With: Sir Henry Spiller | Succeeded by Sir Richard Weston; Sir Henry Spiller |
Peerage of England
| New creation | Earl of Middlesex; First creation 1622–1645 | Succeeded by James Cranfield |
| New creation | Baron Cranfield; 1621–1645 | Succeeded by James Cranfield |
