= James Cranfield, 2nd Earl of Middlesex =

English politician and peer (1621–1651)

The Right Honourable James Cranfield
- The Earl of Middlesex
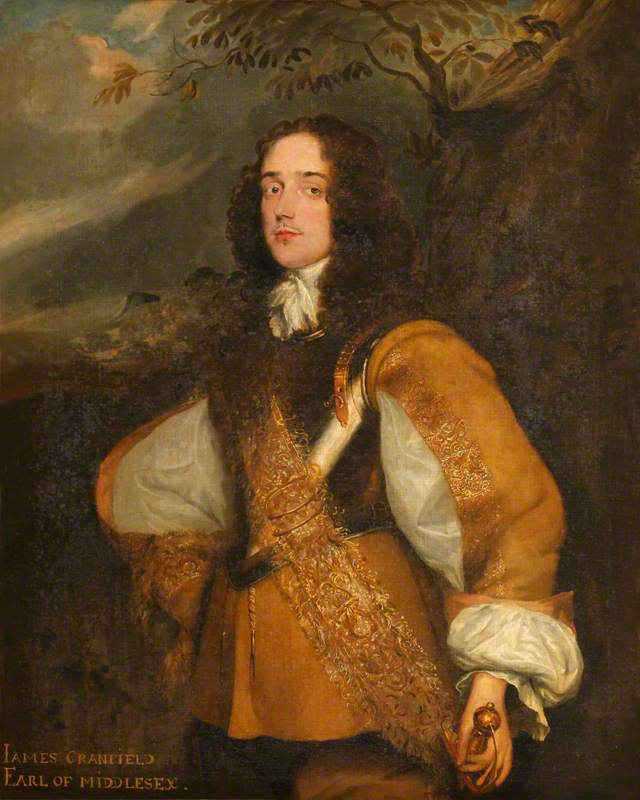
- Tenure: 1645–1651
- Predecessor: Lionel Cranfield, 1st Earl of Middlesex
- Successor: Lionel Cranfield, 3rd Earl of Middlesex
- Born: 1621
- Died: 16 September 1651 (aged 29–30)
- Spouse: Lady Anne Bourchier
- Issue: Lady Elizabeth Cranfield
- Father: Lionel Cranfield, 1st Earl of Middlesex
- Mother: Anne Brett

James Cranfield, 2nd Earl of Middlesex (1621 – 16 September 1651), styled Lord Cranfield from 1622 until 1645, was an English politician who sat in the House of Commons in 1640 and inherited his peerage in 1645.

Cranfield was the son of Lionel Cranfield, 1st Earl of Middlesex and was baptised on 27 December 1621.

In April 1640, Cranfield was elected Member of Parliament for Liverpool in the Short Parliament. He inherited the earldom on the death of his father in 1645. Middlesex was nominated as Lord Lieutenant of Staffordshire in 1646 and Keeper of Kingswood Forest in 1647. In 1648, he was a Parliamentary commissioner to the Treaty of Newport.

Cranfield married Lady Anne Bourchier, daughter of Edward Bourchier, 4th Earl of Bath. His daughter Elizabeth married John Egerton, 3rd Earl of Bridgewater. He was succeeded by his brother Lionel who became the 3rd Earl of Middlesex.

Parliament of England
Vacant Parliament suspended since 1629	Member of Parliament for Liverpool; 1640; With: John Holcroft	Succeeded by Sir Richard Wynn, 2nd Baronet; John Moore
Peerage of England
Preceded by Lionel Cranfield	Earl of Middlesex; 1645–1651	Succeeded by Lionel Cranfield
