= Henry Bourchier, 5th Earl of Bath =

16th-17th c Earl, Lord Privy Seal

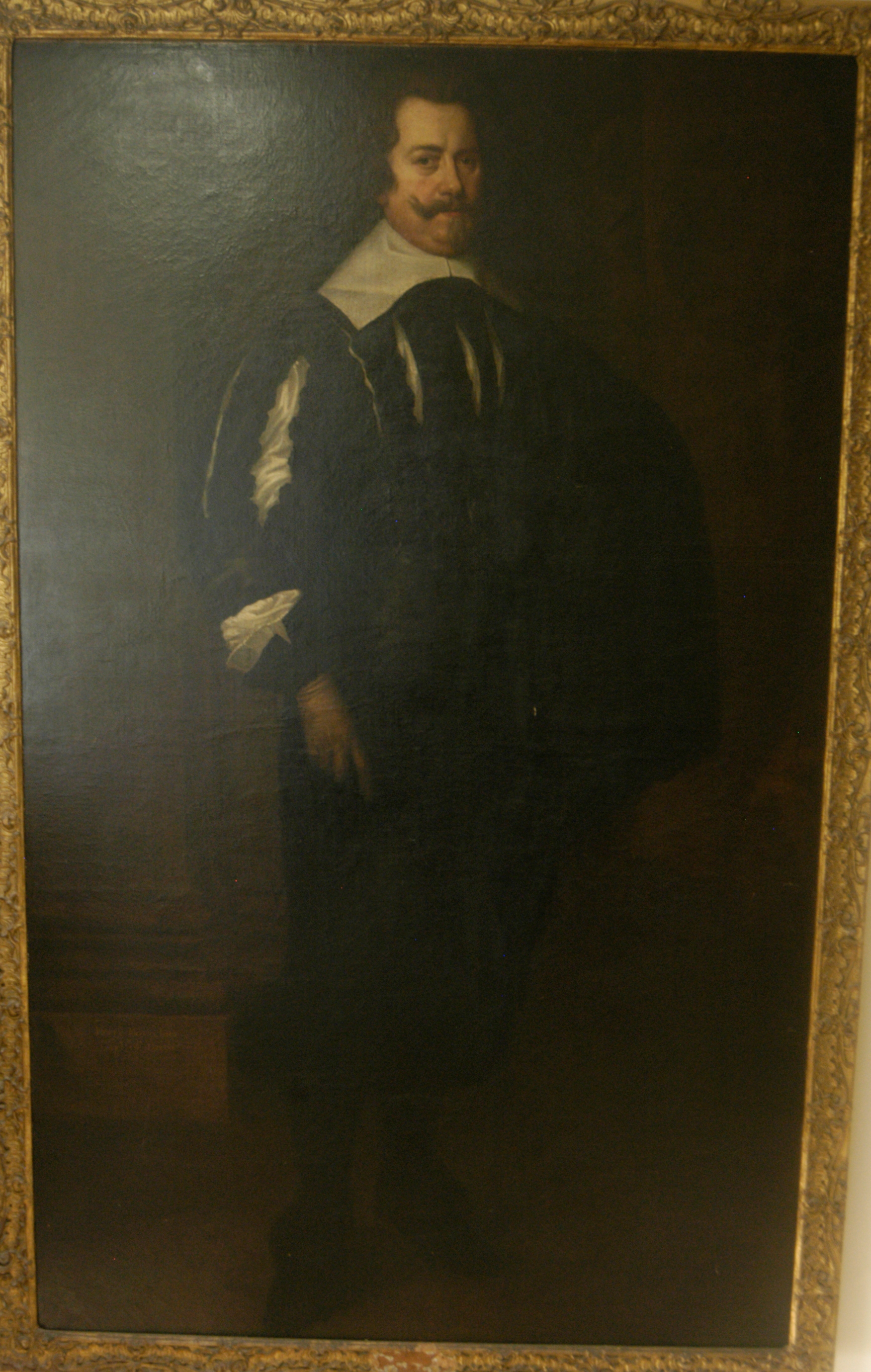
- Henry Bourchier, 5th Earl of Bath, portrait c. 1638–1643, private collection.
- Born: 1587
- Died: 16 August 1654; Tawstock, Devon, England
- Spouse: Rachel Fane
- Parent(s): Sir George Bourchier; Martha Howard

Canting arms of Bourchier: Argent, a cross engrailed gules between four water bougets sable

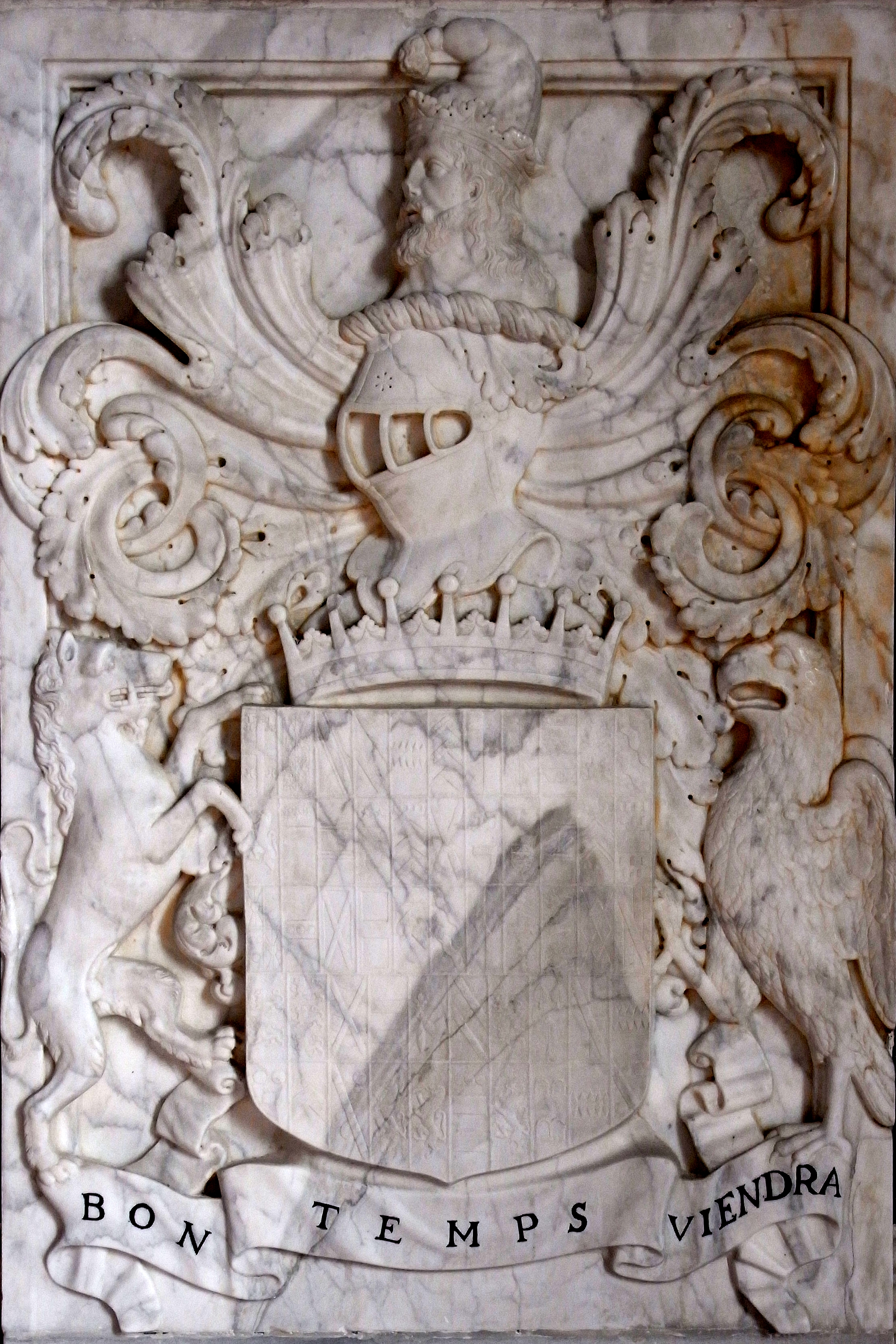
Marble panel with relief sculpture of heraldic achievement of Henry Bourchier, 5th Earl of Bath, detail from his monument in Tawstock Church, Devon. The escutcheon shows 53 quarterings (as on the monument to William Bourchier, 3rd Earl of Bath in the same church), with supporters, dexter: an heraldic tiger argent; sinister: a falcon argent beaked and membered or the wings elevated vulned gules. Above is the crest of Bourchier: A man's head in profile proper ducally crowned or with a pointed cap gules; below the motto of Bourchier: Bon Temps Viendra ("the right time will come")

Henry Bourchier, 5th Earl of Bath (1587 – 16 August 1654) of Tawstock in Devon, was an English peer who held the office of Lord Privy Seal and was a large landowner in Ireland in Limerick and Armagh counties, and in England in Devon, Somerset and elsewhere. Following his inheritance of the Earldom of Bath from his distant cousin, in 1637 he moved from his native Ireland to Tawstock Court in Devon, a county previously unknown to him where he knew few people. As the most senior resident nobleman in the county he was destined to play the leading role for the Royalist cause in Devon during the Civil War but before the outbreak of hostilities, he was captured in 1642 and imprisoned by the Parliamentarians before he had organised his local forces. In the opinion of Clarendon (d. 1674) he was a man of "sour-tempered unsocial behaviour" who "had no excellent or graceful pronunciation" and "neither had or ever meant to do the king the least service".

== Origins ==
Henry Bourchier was born in 1587, probably in Ireland, where he lived during his childhood. He was the fifth son of Sir George Bourchier (d. 1605), an English soldier who settled in Ireland, the 3rd son of John Bourchier, 2nd Earl of Bath (1499–1561) of Tawstock, Devon, by his 2nd wife Eleanor Manners, daughter of George Manners, 11th Baron de Ros. Henry's mother was Martha Howard (c. 1555–1598), daughter of William Howard, 1st Baron Howard of Effingham. Thus his uncle was Charles Howard, 1st Earl of Nottingham, Lord High Admiral.

== Education ==
Henry entered Trinity College Dublin, which his father had helped to found in about 1597. He received the degree of BA in 1605, was elected the 21st Fellow of the college in 1606 and received his MA in 1610. He was one of only eight in the first thirty years of the college's existence who remained a layman.

== Inheritance ==
Three of Henry's four elder brothers died young and the fourth one, Sir John Bourchier (d. 1614), who had been knighted on 24 March 1610/11, of the manor of Clare, County Armagh, died on 25 March 1614 having been MP for County Armagh, 1613–14. By 1614, therefore, Henry had inherited in Ireland from both his father and brother over 18,000 acres (73 km^{2}), and then when in 1636 he became 5th Earl of Bath, after it was refused by his cousin William Bourchier (1624–1689) son of Edward Bourchier, 4th Earl of Bath he added the Bourchier seat of Tawstock in Devon and 36 other manors in Devon and Somerset to his name.

== Career ==
Henry was knighted on 9 November 1621. He was appointed a member of the Privy Council on 8 August 1641.

=== Civil War ===
At the start of the Civil War, Bourchier was Devon's leading royalist. Although not Devonshire born and bred like many of his predecessor earls, he was the most senior noble resident in the county, and thus might have been expected, as later proved false, to wield "notable power and interest" among the local population. In June 1642, Bourchier's servants moved his household from his London townhouse in Lincoln's Inn Fields to Tawstock in Devon, but were ordered to travel lightly to avoid suspicion.

On 19 July 1642 King Charles I, in an unconstitutional act and without the assent of Parliament, issued a commission of array for Devonshire to Henry Bourchier and 27 other nobles and leading gentlemen. This was designed to regain royal control over the county militia which Parliament had sought to control by its own unconstitutional enactment of Militia Ordinance without Royal Assent. The commissioners were required to organise, arm and train the county forces for purposes of defence against external or internal enemies of the kingdom. Bourchier arrived in Devon from York in August 1642 and his first act in putting his commission into effect was to visit the Exeter Assizes between 9–12 August 1642. His efforts were met with politeness but without enthusiasm. On 9 August 1642 an inquest into the looming civil conflict was held at the Exeter Assizes the jury of which appealed to Bourchier as a man of "eminency and known interest in his Majesty's favour to use his good offices toward an accommodation between his Majesty and Parliament and that war, the greatest and worst of evils, be not conceived and chosen for a means to heal our distempers rather than a parliament, the cheapest and best remedy". The local population viewed the commission of array as an act of royal aggression against them, whilst ignoring the royalist argument that it had been resorted to as a defence to the Militia Ordinance passed unconstitutionally by Parliament without Royal Assent. The two competing and contradictory orders had brought unrest and tension to the county. On 13 August 1642, in an attempt to defeat the anti-Royalist propagandists, Bourchier published the text of his commission of array, and issued a statement to the county of Devon that he had "undertaken nothing contrary to the lawes of this kingdom, nor prejudicial or hurtful to any that shall observe it". He attempted further to assure the population that the commission was limited in its intentions and was not a vehicle for levying taxes, as had been rumoured.

Another of the commissioners of Array, Richard Culme of Canonsleigh Abbey, then Sheriff of Devon, attempted (in the company of his neighbour Mr Ayshford of Ayshford in Burlescombe) to read his commission to a public gathering in his local town of Cullompton, but was met with strong opposition from the community. On Bourchier's sudden appearance on the scene with a body of cavaliers, the population became greatly alarmed and started to arm and reinforce their town's defences. Bourchier's next move, resulting in humiliation, was a visit to South Molton where he intended to read his commission to a public gathering. He had attempted to soften up the mayor and corporation beforehand with a meal of venison which he had sent his cook from Tawstock to prepare, and which is shown as an expense of 19 shillings 10 d. in his surviving household accounts.

On Tuesday, 13 September 1642, Bourchier accompanied by a substantial group of local royalist gentry entered South Molton for the purpose of reading his commission and raising troops, but was met by an angry mob of over 1,000 persons who were "in a great rage with the mayor and his company for giving licence that they should enter and swore that if they did attempt anything there or read their commission of array they would beat them all down and kill them (even) if they were all hanged for it". The mob was armed with muskets, halberts, bills, clubs, pikes and poles. The event was recorded by John Cock in 1642, who stated: (Note: Quoted in Cotton, Richard W. (1889), Barnstaple and the Northern Part of Devonshire during the Great Civil War 1642–1646, pp. 66–69)

A letter sent to a worthy gentleman in London, dated from South Molton, the 15th of September 1642, printed in a contemporary tract in my possession, (A Declaration made by the right Honourable the Earle of Bath, one of his Majesties Commissioners of Array, to the whole County of Devonshire, Sec, Septemb. 29 1642. London, Printed for John Wright. Exeter City Library, Reference Room) gives the amusing account of an eye-witness of the attempt of the Earl of Bath and his party to enforce the Commission of Array at South Molton: According to my bounden duty I cannot chuse but acquaint your worship with the newes at South Molton, I my selfe being present at it. On Saturday last the Earl of Bath sent one of his servants unto the Maior of the Towne to know whether he should have a peaceable entrance into his Town the Tuesday following, for he was minded to come there, to meet some Gentlemen upon some occasions; the Maior answered the messenger, that if his intent were for peace, he should come. After better consideration, which the Maior had, he was blamed by some of his friends, for that he had not taken respite to give his answer, but that advice came too late. The Tuesday [Sept. 13] being the day appoynted, there came the Earle of Bath, my Lord Chichester, Baronet Pollard, Sir Popham Southcot, Sir Ralph Sidenham, (Sir Ralph Sydenham, of Youlston, near Barnstaple (which he held in right of his wife), a younger son of Sir John Sydenham of Brimpton, Somerset) Master Basset, Master John Acland, Master John Giffard, Captaine Newcond, with their followers, and diverse others which I cannot name. A Banquet being provided at Henry Hearders house the Inne-keeper, where the Earle sent store of Venison, and his owne Cooke for to dresse it, the common sort of the Towne fell in a great rage with the Maior and his company, for giving licence that they should enter, and swor that if they did attempt any thing there, or read their Commission of Array, they would beate them all downe and kill them, if they were all hanged for it; and thereupon betooke themselves to Armes, both men, women, and children, about the Crosse in the Market place. I doe verrily beleeve they were in number at least l,000, some with Musquets loaden, some with Halberts and blacke Bills, some with Clubs, some with Pikes, some with dunge Evells, some with great Poles, one I saw which had beat the calke of a Sive, and beat him out right, and set him into a long staffe, the women had filled all the steps of the crosse with great stones and got up and sate on them, swearing if they did come there they would braine them. One thing which is worth the noting, a woman which is a Butcher's wife, came running with her lapfull of Rams-hornes for to throw at them. Some of the Gentlemen were comming towards the Crosse, it was thought to publish the Array, presently the people gave a shoute, and did cry, they be come, at which they were all ready to stand against them, the Gentlemen seeing that, betooke themselves every one to house, and after that not one of them nor their servants, durst show themselves in the street; it is thought of many, that if the Towne had not risen against them, they would not so soone have departed. Surely whatsoever collor they put upon it, their intent was ill, for their men gave very dangerous speeches, but God is able with his smalest creatures to daunt the hearts of Kings, as with Lice and Frogs and such like : so amongst this crew there were both men and women with Clubs and Staves, which doe daily beg from doore to doore; and when the Earl rod forth of Town, they did throw stones after him and his men. I shall desire your Worships to excuse my boldnesse in writing so large; but if you had seene it, you would have thought this Relation to be too little.

=== Arrest and imprisonment ===
On 15 August 1642 Bourchier rejected a summons from the House of Lords which required his attendance at Parliament, and stated as his reason that he wished to avoid the "interruptions and menaces and affronts by people in London and Westminster" he had suffered in the previous session. This was taken as a declaration of his break with Parliament and on 23 August the House of Lords ordered his arrest. After a delay during which Bourchier continued to recruit for the royal cause in Devon, at 11 pm on 28 September 1642 Bourchier was peaceably arrested at home in Tawstock Court by the parliamentarian Captain Dewett and his troop of horse. He was immediately imprisoned in the Tower of London.

=== Release from imprisonment ===
Bourchier made appeals to many persons, including the king, for his release. His wife helped him in this regard and wrote to the queen assuring her of their loyalty. Bourchier whilst in bed one morning was searched by his gaolers and correspondence from his wife was confiscated, to which he objected that such correspondence between husband and wife was privileged and therefore exempt from examination. He was released on 4 August 1643, but on condition that he should go into exile on the Continent and not serve the king. These conditions he ignored and two days after his release he wrote to the king and set off for the royal court then at Oxford. In October 1643 he wrote to his wife in Devon to "remember me to as many in that country as you think worth the remembering", a sign of his disenchantment with the Parliamentarian members of the gentry of Devon, his neighbours and former friends.

On 22 January 1644, in the Oxford Parliament he was appointed by the king as Lord Privy Seal, which office had previously been held 1572–73 by his maternal grandfather Lord Howard of Effingham. He held the post of Lord Privy Seal for the remainder of his life. He was appointed in 1644 Commissioner for the Defense of Oxford. In the Summer of 1644, on the approach of the Parliamentarian army from the east, Bourchier and his wife fled from Tawstock and Devon into the far west of Cornwall. For this action he was publicly criticised by certain royalists for having abandoned his post, and petitioned the king for redress to what he viewed as slander, stating that he feared for his safety and was thus entitled to withdraw. However, in another account, he claimed he went to Cornwall to inspect one of the poorly performing estates.

In June 1645, the 15-year-old Prince Charles (the future King Charles II) visited Bourchier at Tawstock Court, which event is recorded in the surviving Tawstock household accounts. (Prince Charles had been sent for his safety from plague-stricken Bristol to Barnstaple, where he stayed at the house of Grace Beaple (d.1651), widow of the merchant Richard Beaple (d.1643), thrice Mayor of Barnstaple, from about 15 June to 8 July) Among the provisions purchased for the occasion were lobsters, artichokes, raspberries, and masards (cherries long grown in the locality). A cook was brought in from nearby Barnstaple and payments were made to the Prince's own cooks and musicians.

=== Career during Commonwealth ===
During the Commonwealth he was classed as a delinquent and in December 1648 the Standing Committee of Devon, responsible for the Articles of Delinquency accused him under five main charges:

- He had deserted the House of Lords and taken up arms against Parliament.
- He had actively worked for the Commission of Array in Devon and Cornwall.
- He had lent money to the king.
- He had sat in the king's assembly in Oxford.
- He had accepted the king's appointment as Lord Privy Seal.

He was forced to compound for his delinquency and his surviving household accounts for both his London residence and for Tawstock Court show recurring payments in this regard. In November 1648, the sequestrator drew up a room-by-room inventory of the contents of Tawstock Court, which survives, providing valuable insight into the arrangement of what was then the grandest house in Devon, since burnt down and rebuilt. Bourchier died in 1654 and thus did not live to witness the Restoration of the Monarchy of 1660.

== Marriage ==
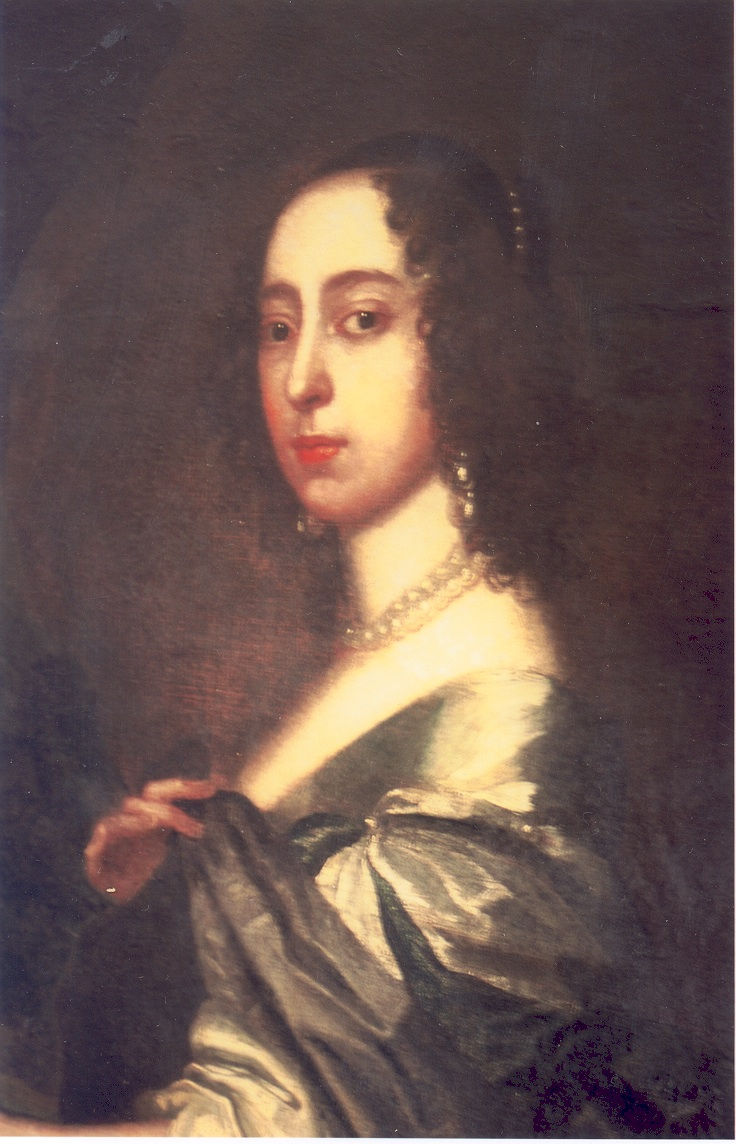
Rachel Fane, Countess Dowager of Bath (detail). Pair to the painting above

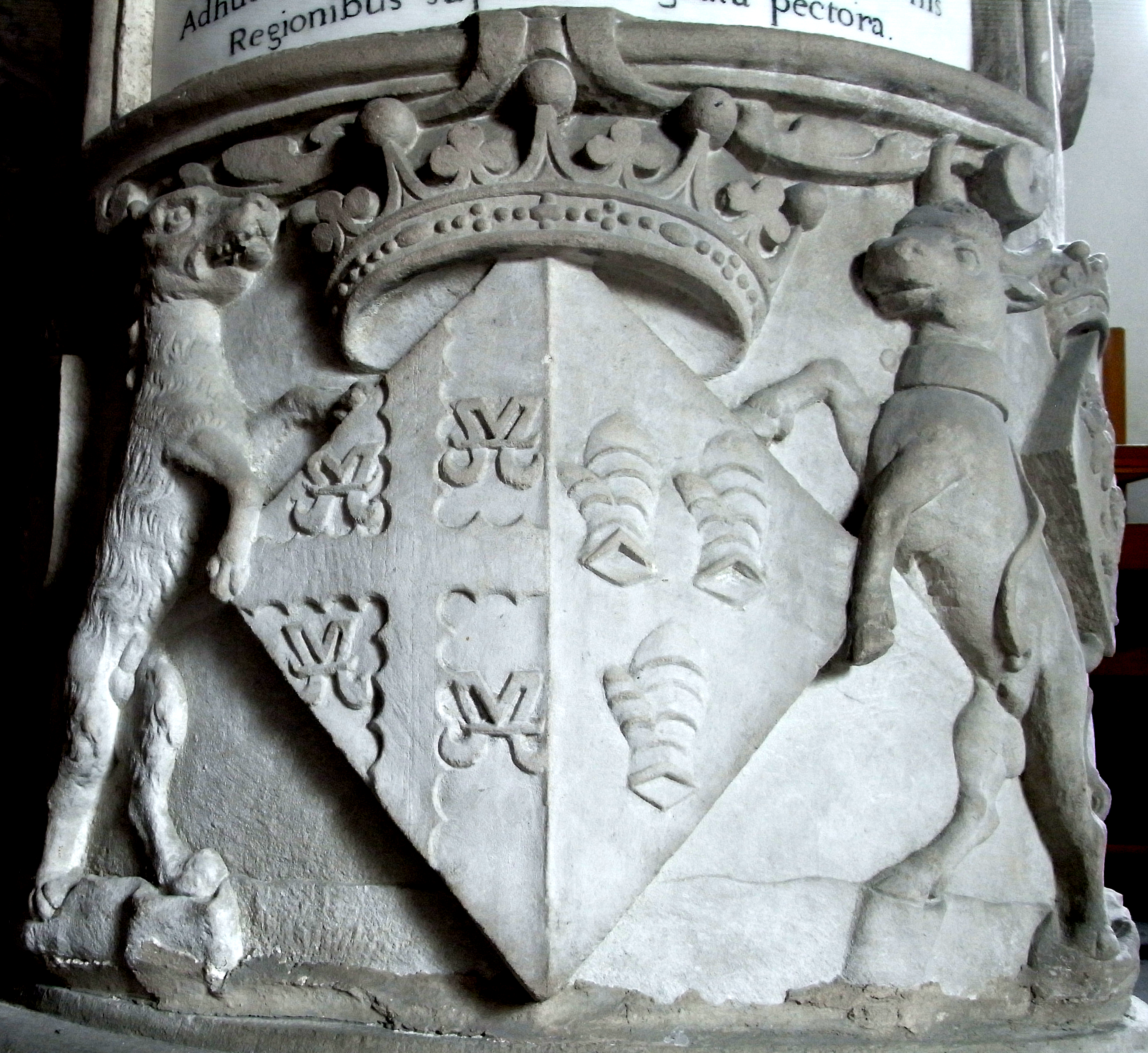
Lozenge escutcheon (as used by females) showing arms of Bourchier impaling Fane (Azure, three dexter gauntlets back affrontée or), with supporters the Fane/Nevill bull and bear, sculpted on the base of the statue of Rachel Fane in Tawstock Church

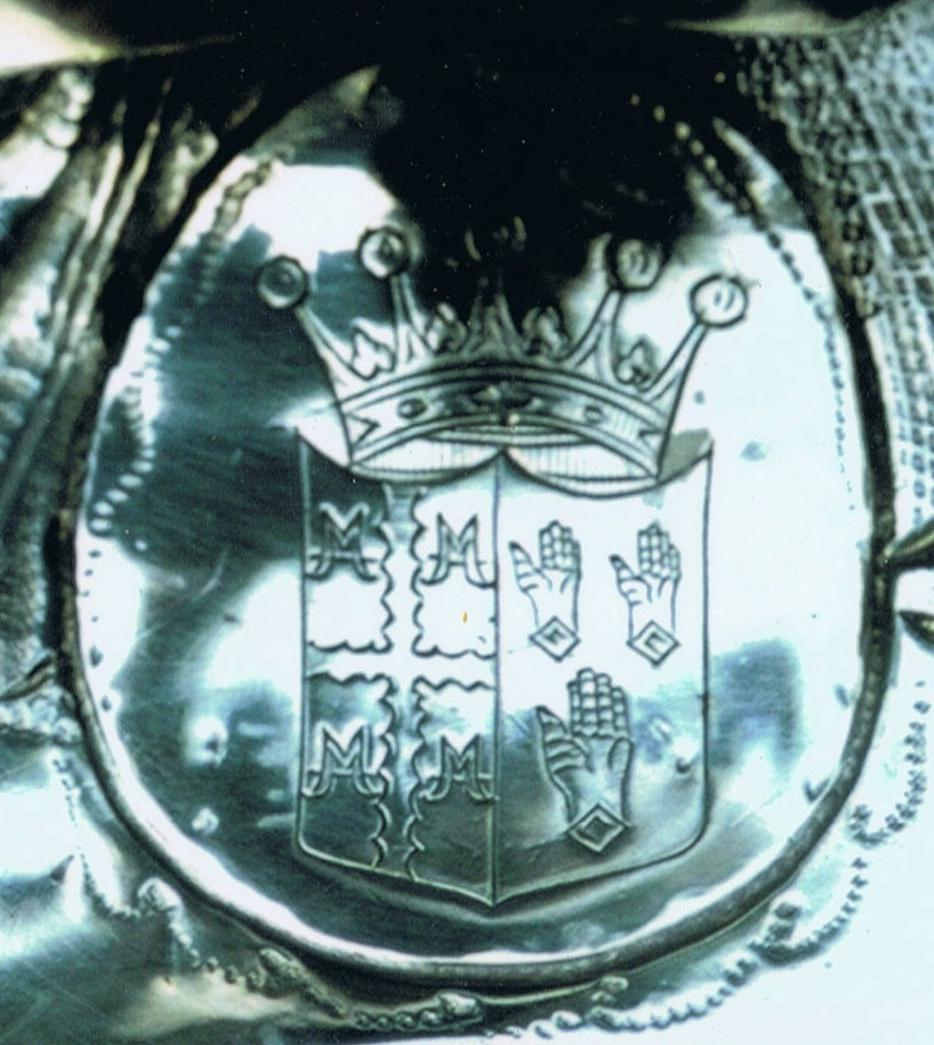
_{Bourchier impaling Fane, on the base of a 1679 candlestick}

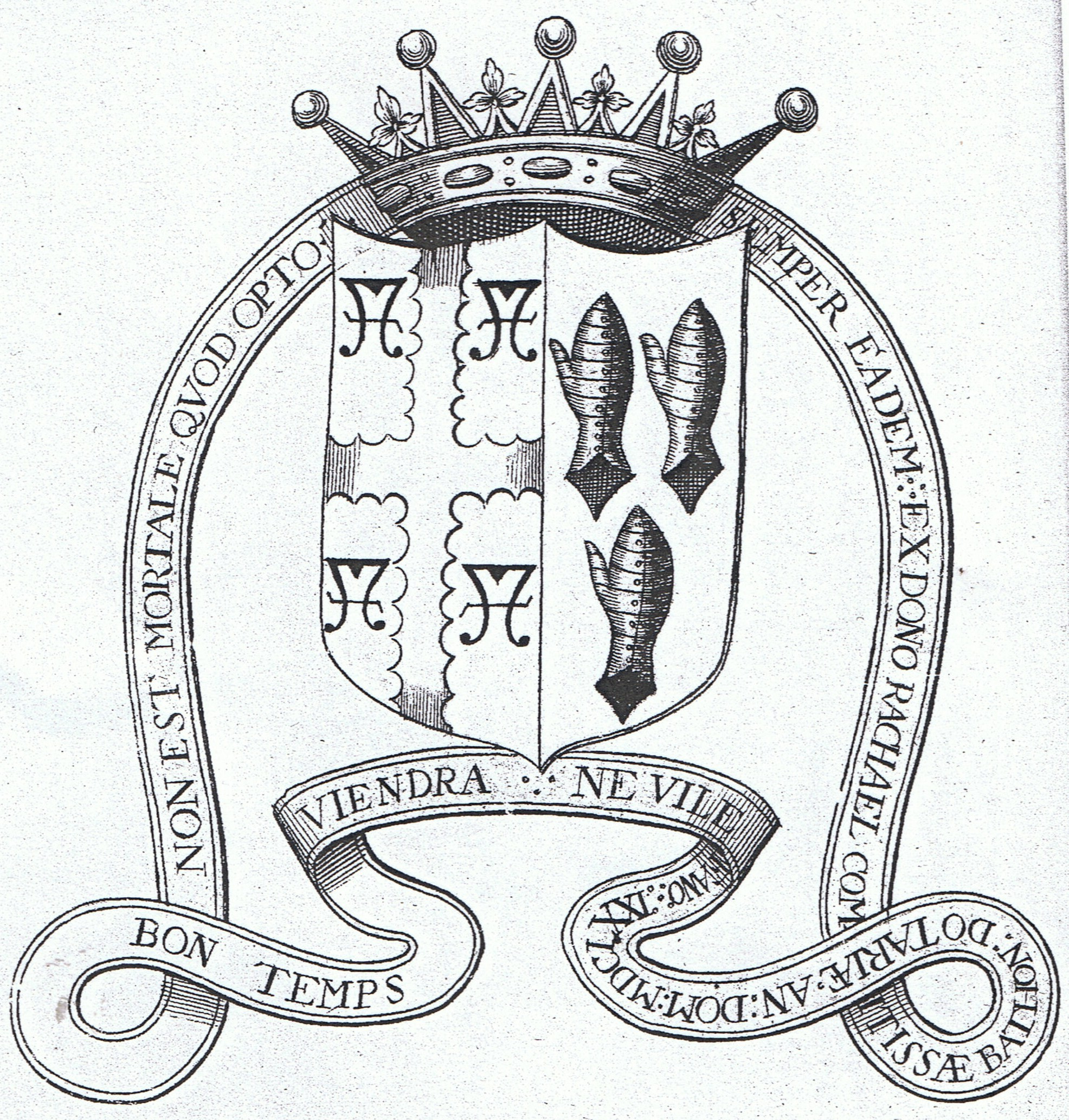
_{Bookplate of Lady Bath, 1671. Showing Bourchier impaling Fane, and their combined mottoes. Non Est Mortale Quod Opto – Bon Temps Viendra – Ne Vile Fano – Semper Eadem – EX DONO RACHAEL COMITISSAE BATHON : DOTARIÆ AN DOM:MDCLXXI.}

On 13 December 1638 at the age of 50, Henry Bourchier, by now 5th Earl of Bath, married at St Bartholomew the Great, Smithfield (the Mildmay family church), 25-year-old Rachel Fane (1612/13–1680), the fifth daughter of Francis Fane, 1st Earl of Westmorland, by his wife Mary Mildmay (d. 1640), daughter and eventual sole heiress of Sir Anthony Mildmay (d. 1617), of Apethorpe Hall, Northamptonshire. The marriage was childless.

== Monument to wife ==
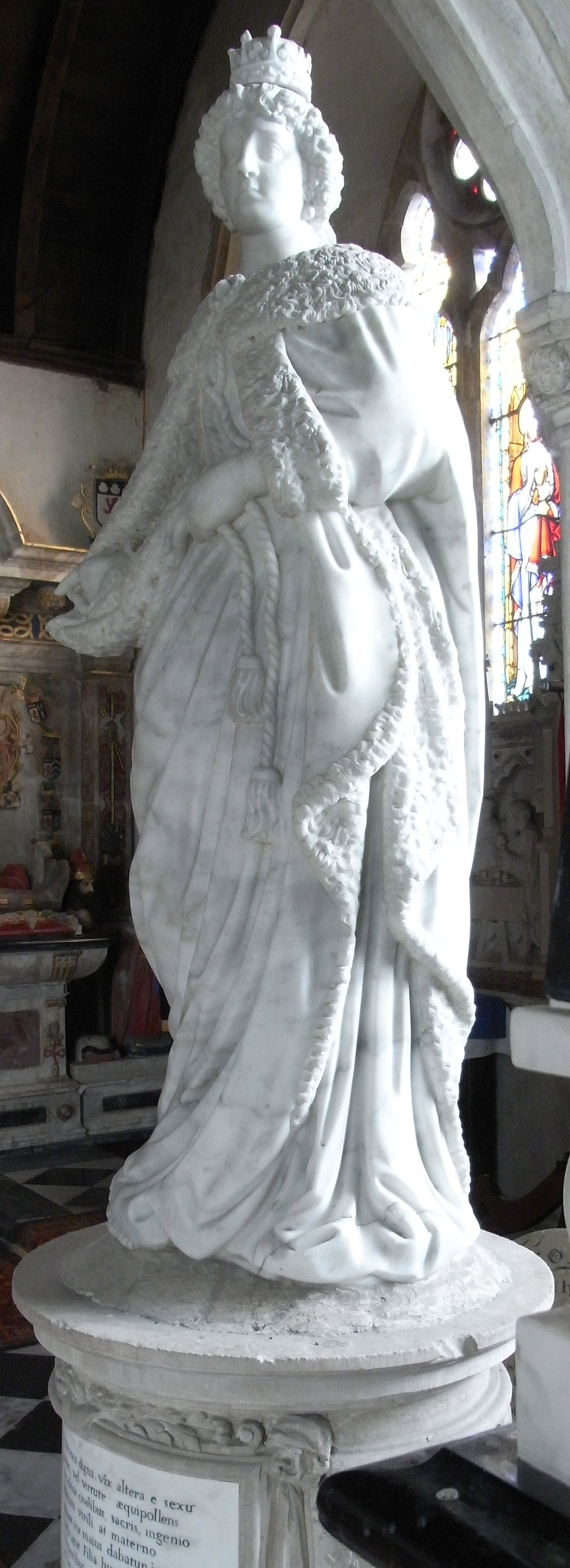
Monument to Lady Rachel Fane, Tawstock Church, Devon

Rachel's monument exists in St Peter's Church, Tawstock, in Devon, given by the Diocese of Bath and Wells, a white marble life-size standing female figure by Balthasar Burman, a replica of the statue made in 1671/1672 by his father Thomas Burman of Mary Talbot, Countess of Shrewsbury (1556–1632), which is situated in a niche in the Shrewsbury Tower of Second Court, the building of which she financed, in St John's College, Cambridge. The Latin inscription is as follows:

Rachel Comitissa Henrico digna, vix altera e sexu vel animo, vel virtute aequipollens Rebus domesticis, civilibus, sacris, ingenio plusquam virili, at materno (quo suo tempore vix maius dabatur in terris) Ecclesiae Anglicanae Filia humilis, et devota, et iniquis temporibus eiectorum Patrum mater et hie pene unica fautrix Unicum Lugendum quod in se perjisset nobile Bourchieri nomen, ni sat illa habuit virtutum vel illud immortale reddere Et liset improlis plus mille liberorum Parens, quos liberalissime educavit, dotavit, sacravit, et nobilitavit. Adhuc vivit et nunquam moritura dum his Regionibus supersunt grata pectora.("Rachel, a countess really worthy of Henry, who had scarce an equal of her sex either in spirit or in virtue. In domestic, civil and religious affairs she had a genius exceeding that of a man, and such a motherly disposition that scarce a greater then existed in the world. She was a humble and devout daughter of the Church of England and in times of persecution a mother to the ejected Fathers and in these parts almost their only protectress. This alone was worthy of our tears, that in her the noble name of Bourchier would have been extinct if she had not been endowed with virtues sufficient even to render it immortal and though she was childless yet she was parent to more than a thousand children, whom in a very genteel manner she brought up, gave portions to, consecrated and even ennobled. She still lives and never will die while any spark of gratitude remains in this country")

== Death and burial ==
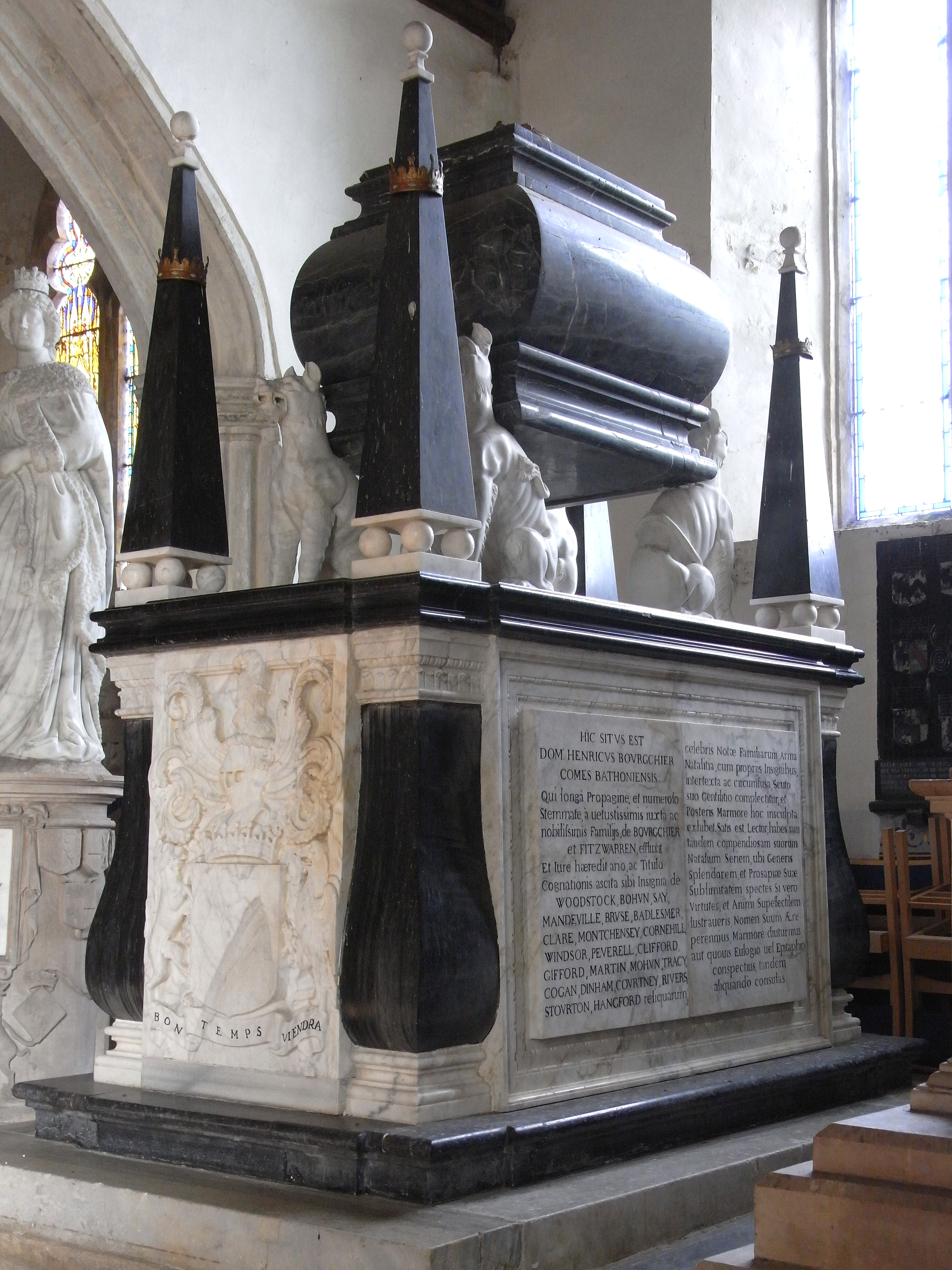
Monument to Henry Bourchier, 5th Earl of Bath (1593–1654), Tawstock Church

Henry Bourchier died at Tawstock on 16 August 1654, and was buried there the next day.

== Monument at Tawstock ==
His widow erected in the south aisle chapel of Tawstock Church a large monument to her husband, (Note: Last line of Latin inscription states Rachel erected monument) deemed "splendid" by Pevsner, "massive and ugly" by Hoskins and "almost unequalled in singularity and absurdity" by Marland. It consists of a free standing base of black and white marble on which sit four white marble dogs supporting on their shoulders a big black square bulging sarcophogus. On each of the four corners is a black obelisk. On the sides of the base is a lengthy epitaph in Latin.

== Succession ==
On Lord Bath's death without children (decessit sine prole) the Earldom of Bath became extinct. His Irish estates passed to his widow, and from her to her nephew Sir Henry Fane, KB, (1650-1705/6), then to his son Charles, who, on the strength of this inheritance, was in 1718 created Viscount Fane and Baron Loughguyre, both in the Peerage of Ireland, thence by descent to about 1979. The lesser entailed English estate in Devon centred on Tawstock, passed elsewhere, to the Wrey family, descended from one of the three daughters of the 3rd Earl of Bath.

== Residences ==
Henry lived from 1640 at Bath House, 53/54 Lincoln's Inn Fields, his London townhouse. His Devon seat was Tawstock Court, Tawstock, North Devon. Other seats of his were: Clare Castle, near Tandragee, County Armagh; Bourchier Castle, Lough Gur, near Bruff, Limerick, a tower house originally built by the FitzGerald family, Earls of Desmond. Bourchier Castle still stands, although Clare Castle, 'a stoney house or castle of lime', a 100 by 80-foot (24 m) fortified house, is today a ruin.

== Estates ==
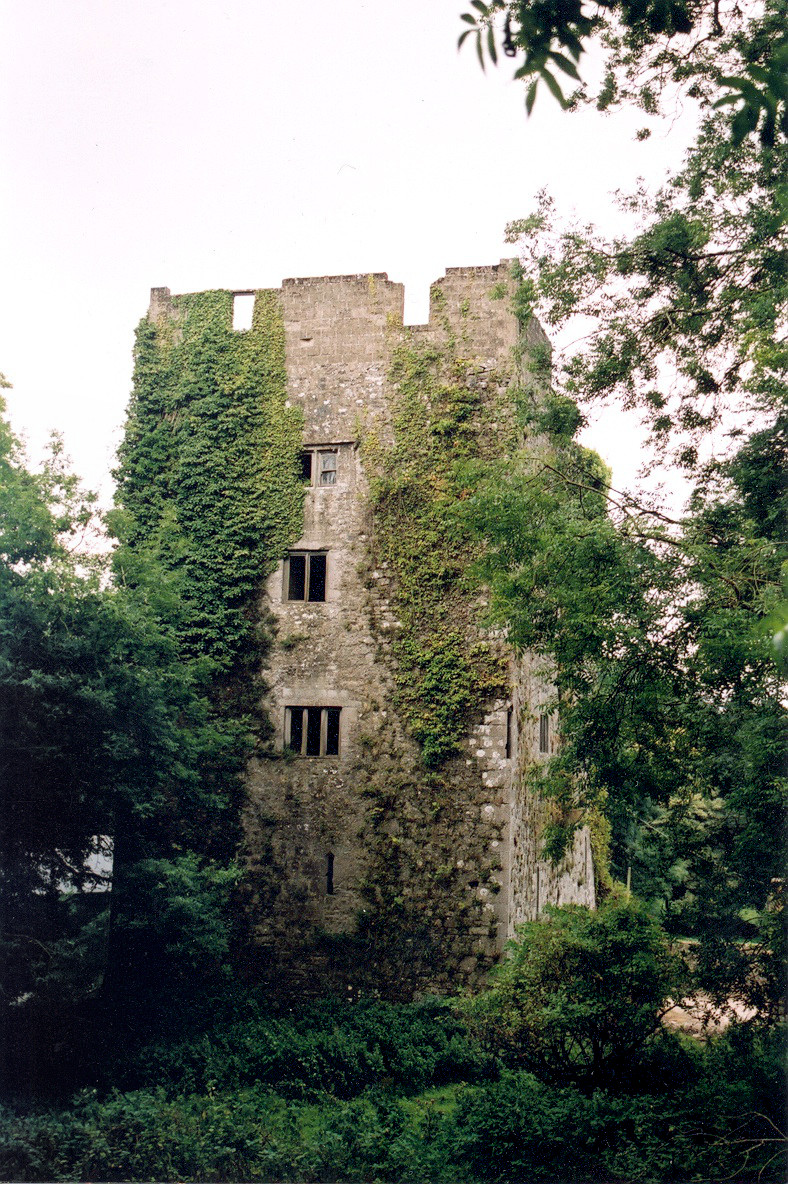
_{Bourchier Tower at Lough Gur (September 2005), owned by the Earl, at the heart of his county Limerick estate.}

The county Limerick estate (which spilt over into county Tipperary) covered 12,800 acres (52 km^{2}) (English acres) and included the manors of Lough Gur and Glenogra, in the Barony of the Small County in County Limerick, Munster, which had been granted by letters patent or other grant of Queen Elizabeth I (E.I. 30) on 2 November 1589 to his father Sir George.

In about 1718 the estate consisted of: The manor of Loughguyre & Glenogre, 5 castles, 300 Messuages, 1500 cottages, 400 Tofts, 8 Mills, 1600 Gardens, 2,500 acres (10 km^{2}) of land, 1,300 acres (5.3 km^{2}) of Meadow, 3,600 acres (15 km^{2}) of Pasture, 500 acres (2.0 km^{2}) of Wood & underwood, 300 acres (1.2 km^{2}) of Furze & Heath & 200 acres (0.81 km^{2}) other.

Most of the estate in Armagh, at least 6,000 acres (24 km^{2}), lying between Tandragee and Portadown, was granted to Henry's elder brother John (died 1614) by a patent of James I (J.I.8) on 30 November 1610. Henry acquired more land in county Armagh from Sir Francis Cook on 23 July 1646. Part of the Armagh estate, Brackagh Bog, under two miles (3 km) south of Portadown, is today a Nature and Moss Reserve. Other lands in both Limerick and Armagh were sold to them or once belonged to Sir William St Leger (1586–1642) as shown by a Deep Poll, dated 17 July 1619.

In 1805 at the time of its partition between the heirs of the Charles Fane, 2nd Viscount Fane, the last viscount, namely Peter, 3rd Count de Salis and John Montagu, 5th Earl of Sandwich, the Bourchier/Fane Irish estate comprised 6,620 acres (26.8 km^{2}) in county Limerick (with gross annual rental value of £4,189), and 6,908 acres (27.96 km^{2}) in county Armagh (worth £2,671 per annum). In 1883 the de Salis part of the divided Bourchier estate in Ireland was listed in Bateman's Great Landowners, Return of Owners of Land (taken from the Return of Owners of Land, 1873), as consisting of 3,663 acres (14.82 km^{2}), (worth £5,392 per annum), in County Armagh and 4,026 acres (16.29 km^{2}), (worth £3,349 per annum), in County Limerick.

== Tawstock accounts ==
Lady Rachel Fane, by Cornelius Johnson, c. 1630.

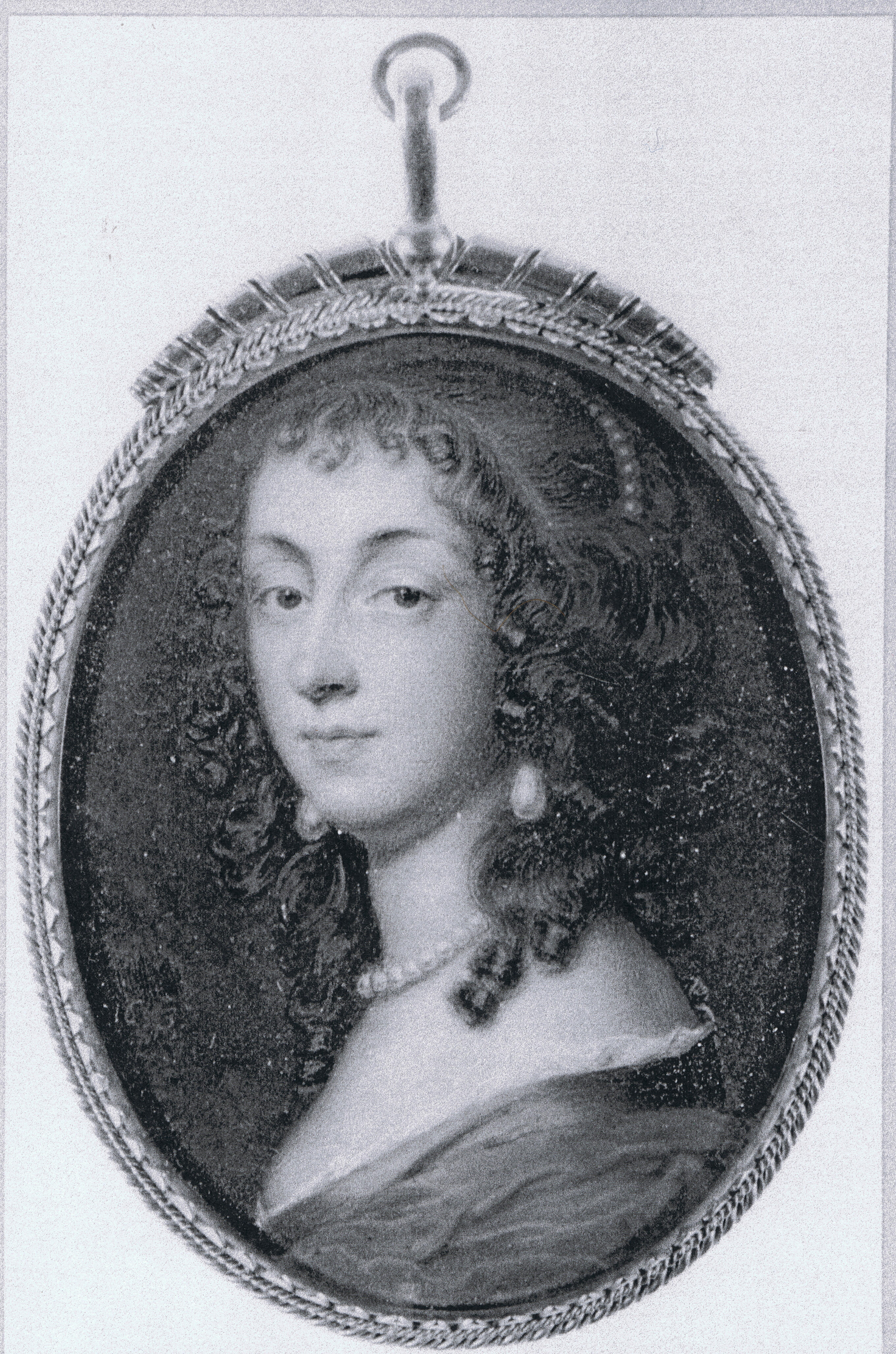
Miniature portrait of Lady Rachel Fane, c. 1640, attributed to Richard Gibson.

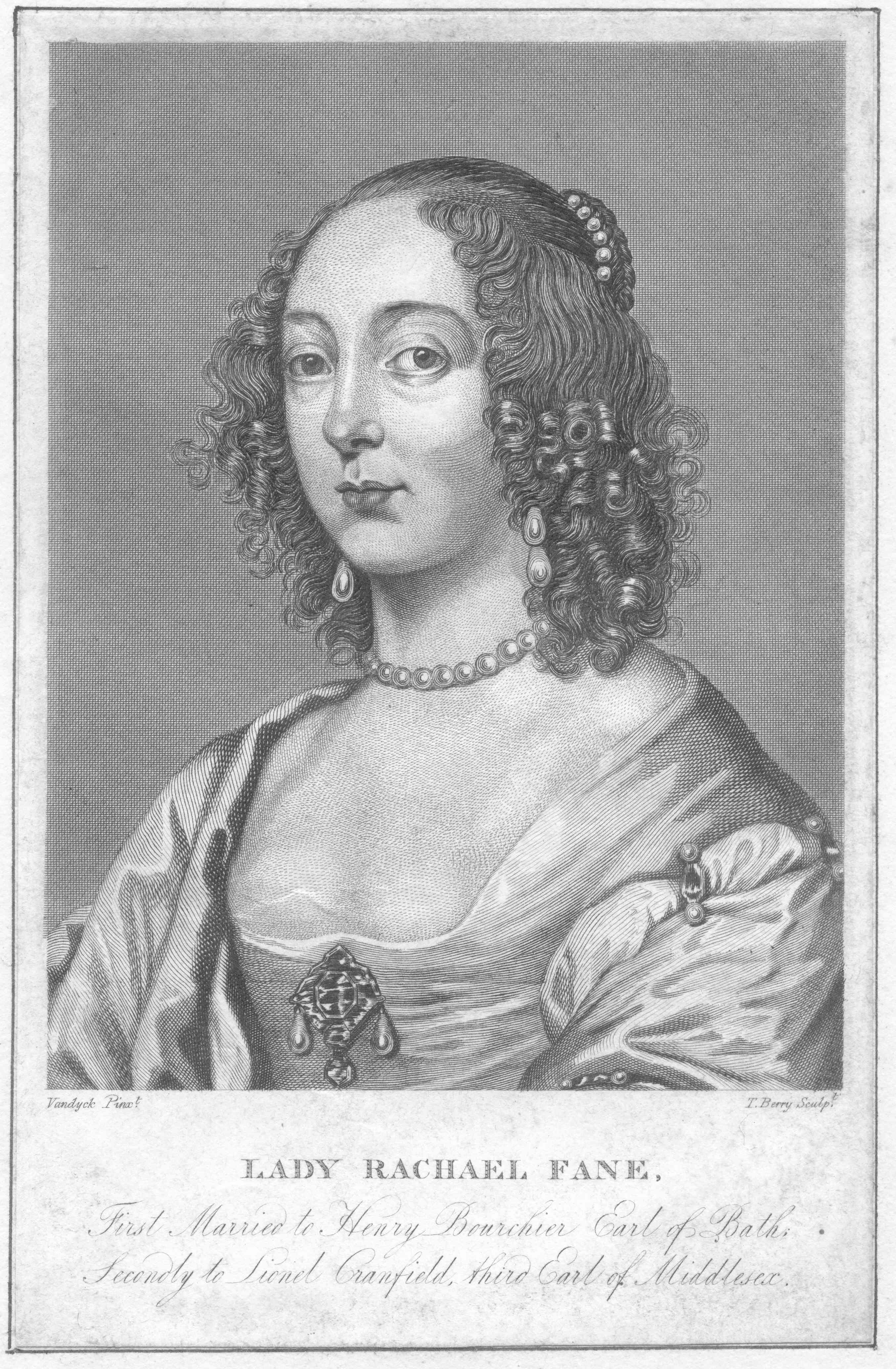
T. Berry's engraving after Pierre Lombart's engraving after the original oil portrait by Van Dyck

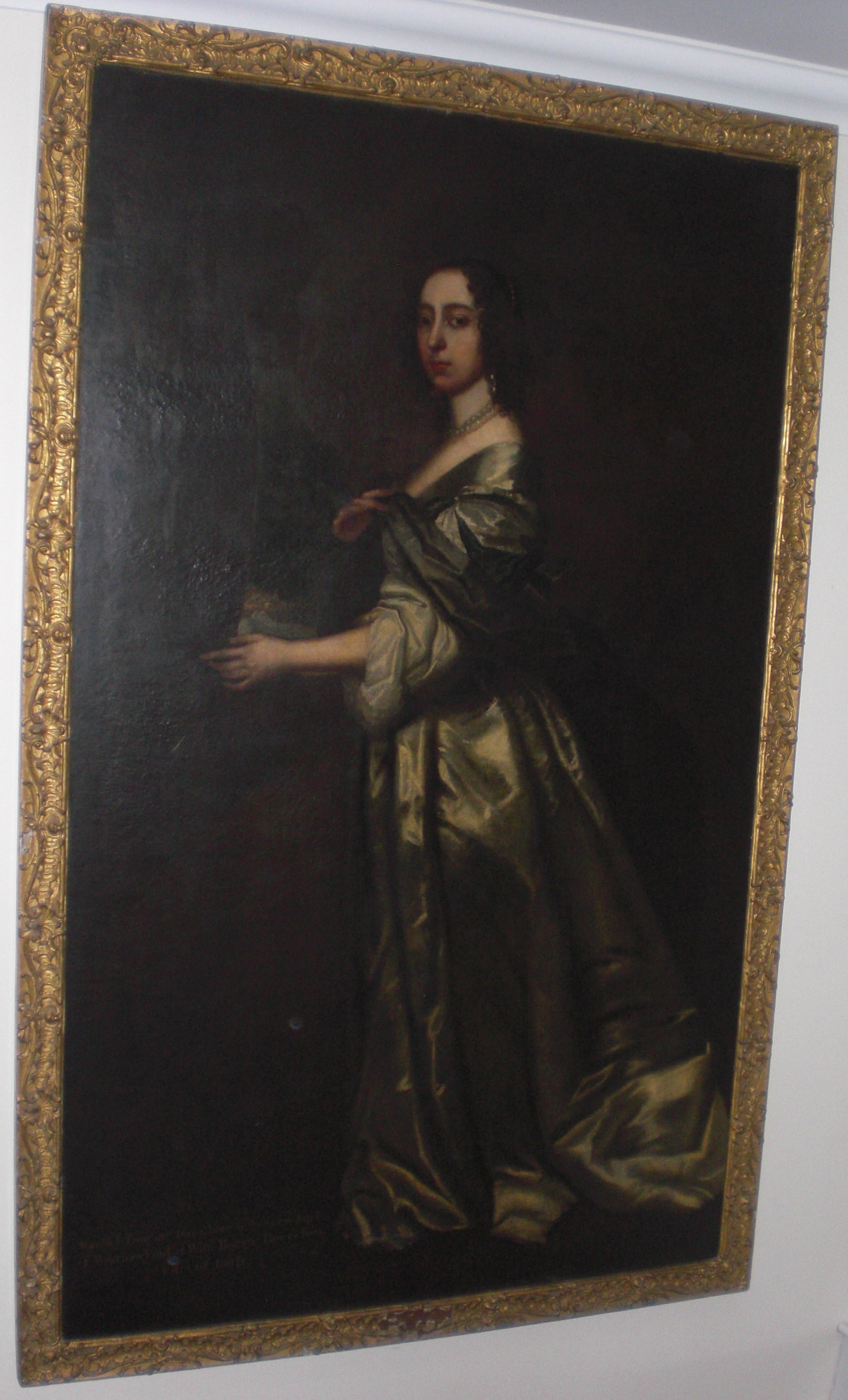
_{Portrait of Rachel Fane, Countess of Bath (1613–1680) (and sometime Countess of Middlesex), painted c. 1642/43-1646. (79 x 48.5 inches).}

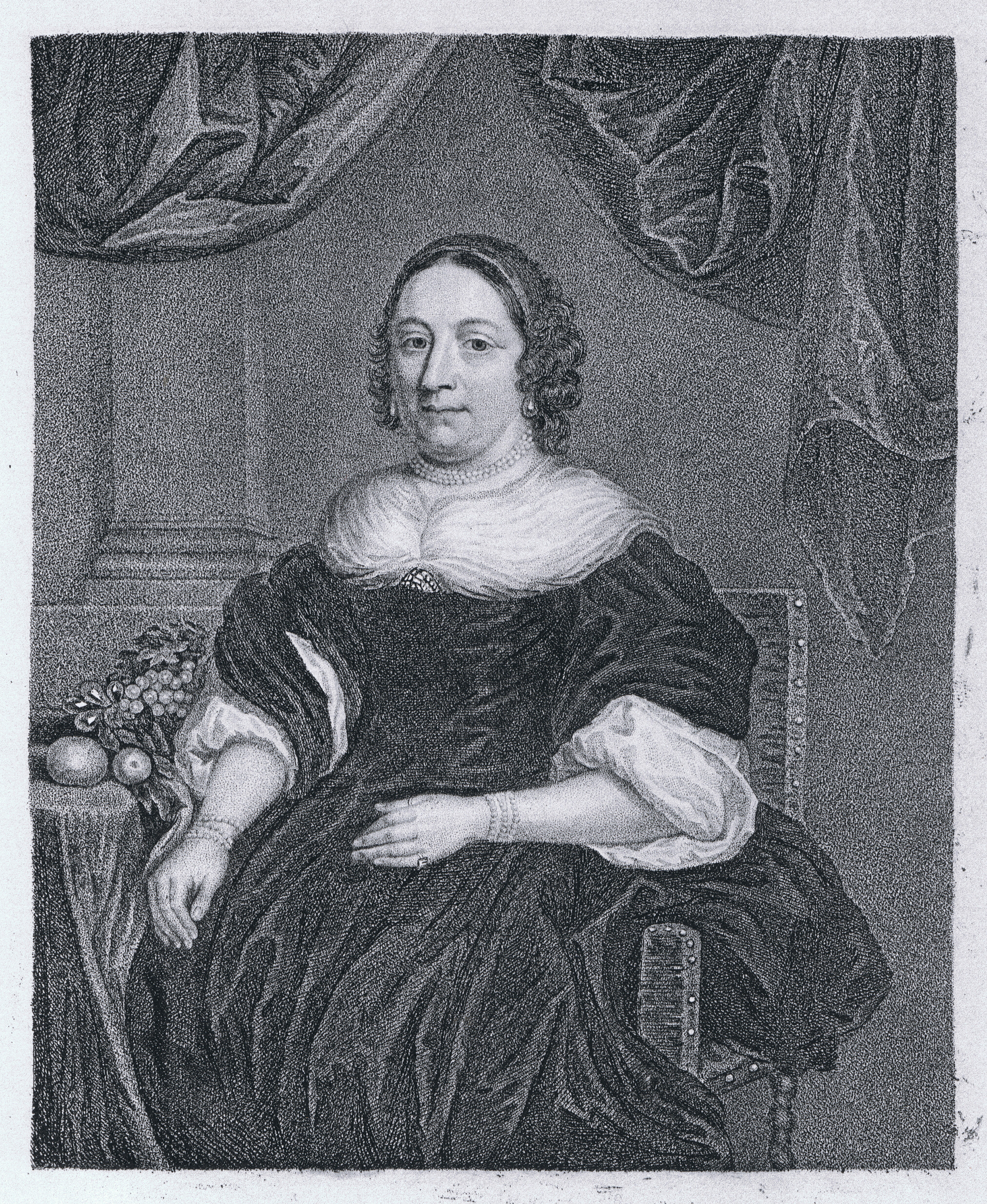
Engraving of Rachel, Countess of Middlesex, c.1660-1670.

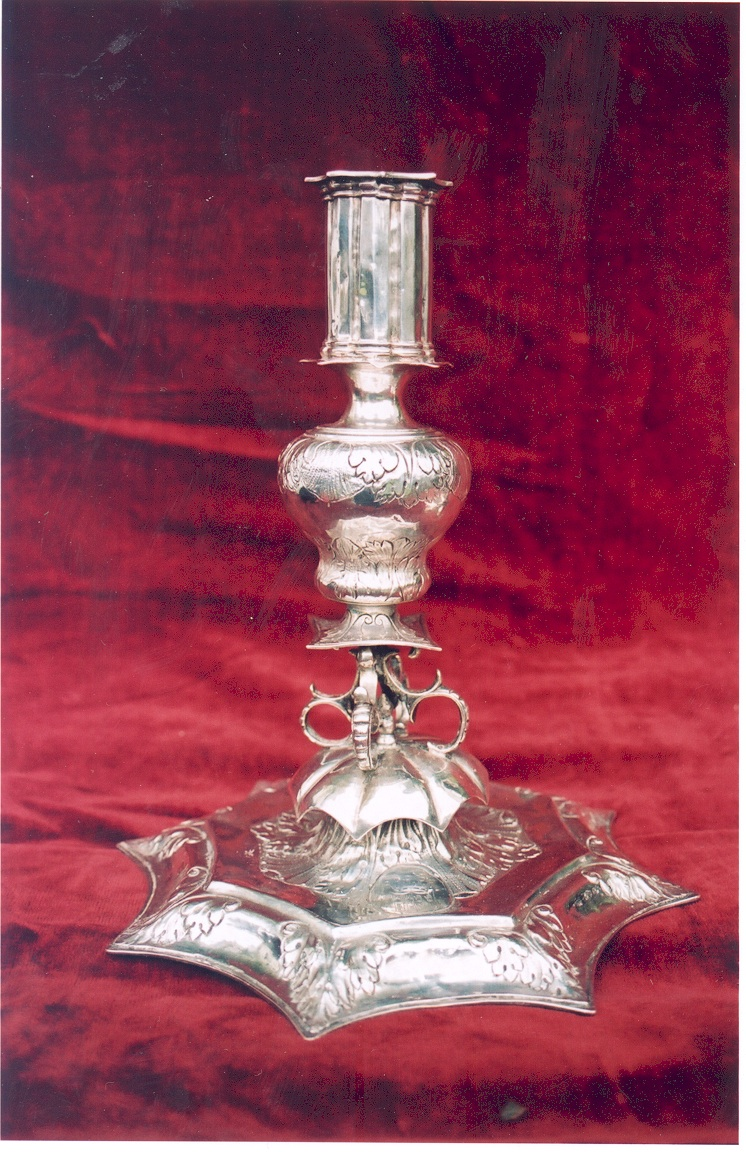
_{One of a pair of candlesticks made for Bath's widow. Marks for Robert Cooper, London, 1679. They bear arms of Bourchier impaling Fane.}

Todd Gray's transcription of the Bath account books reveals some of the Countess of Bath's orders:

- June 1640 paid Mr Gelthrope [George Geldorp, c. 1595–1665] for the Lady Peterborough's picture £12 0s 0d, [she was Lord Bath's cousin];
- between 29 May and 4 June 1641 to Sir Anthony Vandick in part for my picture 20 0 0;
- between 4 and 14 June 1641 to Sir Anthony Vandick for my picture 10 0 0; for the frame 4 0 0; to his man 1 0 0, [Van Dyck died 9 December 1641];
- November 1641 paid Lewis [Peter Lely, 1618–1680, who arrived in England April 1641] the 6th of Novem. for a copy of my own Dick to the ... [illegible] 18s;
- cJanuary 1642/43 To Lewie [Lely] the painter in further part of his bill of £15 5s 0;
- c.March to Lewie the painter in further part of his bill 5 0 0;
- May [?] 1646 Lewis the painter is to have £8 for 2 pieces & 18s for one frame & £5 for a copy drawn by him of my picture;
- September – March 1646/47 to Mr Gildropp by bill 01 18 00.

The vicar of Shiplake the Rev. James Granger (1723–1776) in his Biographical History of England, from Egbert the Great to the Revolution (1769) describes the Lombart engraving of the Van Dyck portrait of RACHAEL MIDDLESEXIAE comitissa:

Rachel, daughter of Francis Fane, the first Earl of Westmoreland. She was first married to Henry Bourchier, Earl of Bath; secondly, to Lionel Cranfield, the third Earl of Middlesex, who succeeded his brother James in 1651. Lionel died without issue by her, 26 Oct 1674. I have seen her picture at Basilden, in Berkshire [near Granger's Shiplake], among the ancestors of the late Lord Viscount Fane. She is said to have left a very large sum to build a private chapel, but the money was never applied to the use for which it was intended. Lord Fane used to speak of her as a very good woman. Her portrait was painted by Vandyck, in the reign of Charles I. The print should have been inscribed, "Lady Rachel Fane, or Rachel Countess of Bath." Anachronisms of this kind are too common upon portraits.

Oswald Barron, writing in 1905, described her thus: "She was a great lady and a busybody, and her cloud of kinsfolk held her in fear as their patroness and suzerain...a masterful woman, she lived feared and respected by her numerous kindred whom she advanced by her interest at court".

== Notes ==
Political offices
Preceded by Edward Nicholas	Lord Privy Seal; 1644–1654	Succeeded by The Lord Robartes
Peerage of England
Preceded by Edward Bourchier	Earl of Bath; 1637–1654	Extinct
