= Lionel Cranfield, 3rd Earl of Middlesex =

English peer

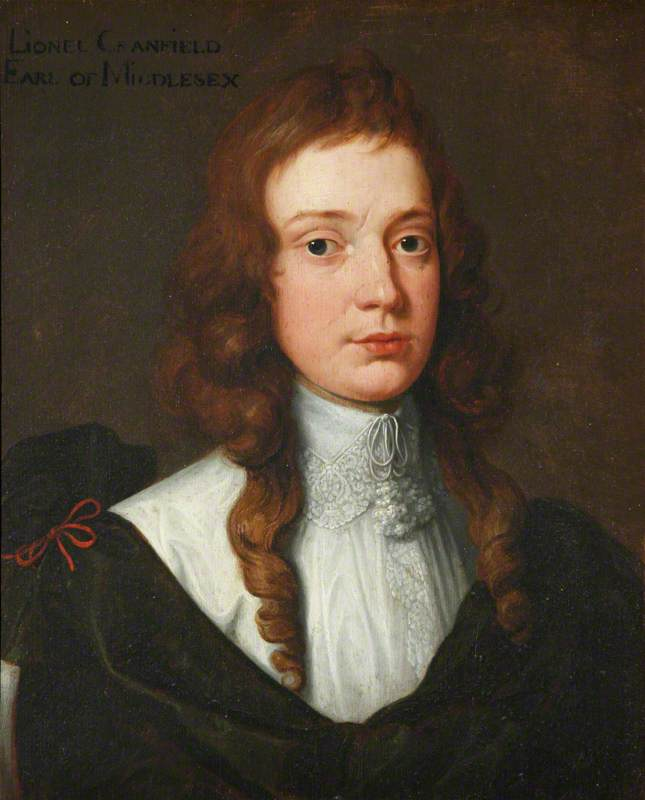
Portrait titled Lionel Cranfield Earl of Middlesex at top left

Lionel Cranfield, 3rd Earl of Middlesex (1625 – 26 October 1674) was an English peer, styled Hon. Lionel Cranfield from 1640 until 1651.

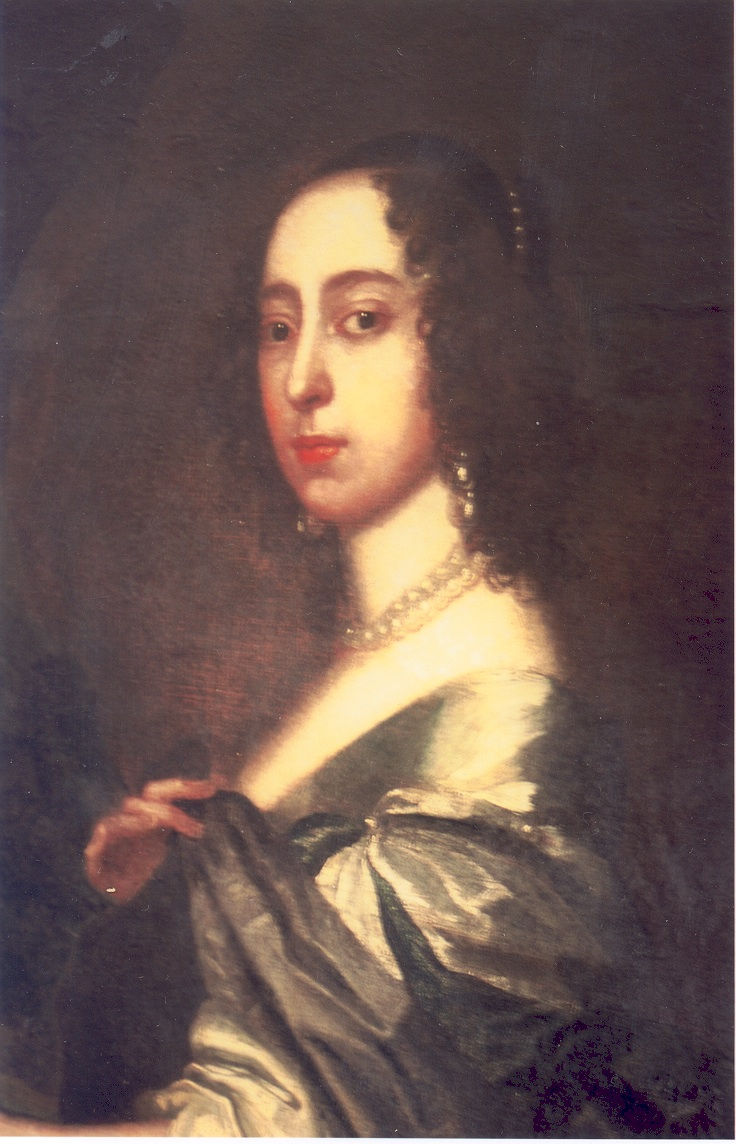
Cranfield's wife, the Dowager Countess of Bath, who became Countess of Middlesex

Cranfield succeeded his brother James as Earl of Middlesex in 1651. Around 1655, he married Rachel, daughter of Francis Fane, 1st Earl of Westmorland, and the widow of Henry Bourchier, 5th Earl of Bath. She was twelve years older than him, and the marriage was unhappy. They had no children, and the countess obtained a legal separation in 1661.

In May 1660, the earl was one of the six peers deputed by the Convention Parliament to invite the return of Charles II of England. He was appointed a Gentleman of the Bedchamber to Charles II in 1673.

He died the following year without issue; his titles became extinct, and his estates passed to his nephew Charles Sackville, 6th Earl of Dorset.

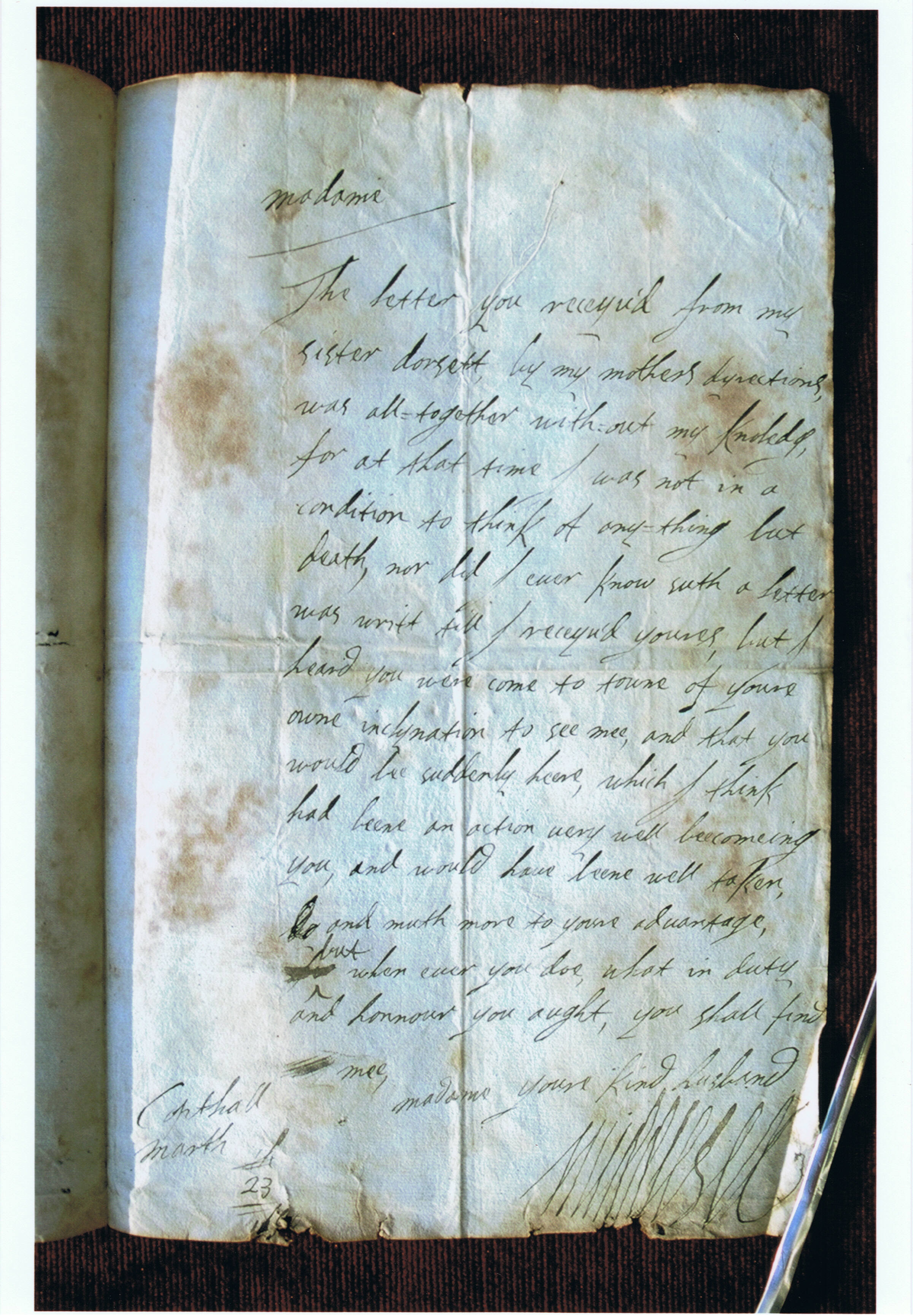
Autograph letter from Cranfield (at Copt Hall) to his estranged wife, circa 1670.

Peerage of England
Preceded by James Cranfield	Earl of Middlesex; 1651–1674	Extinct
