= Edward Bourchier, 4th Earl of Bath =

British nobleman (1590–1636)

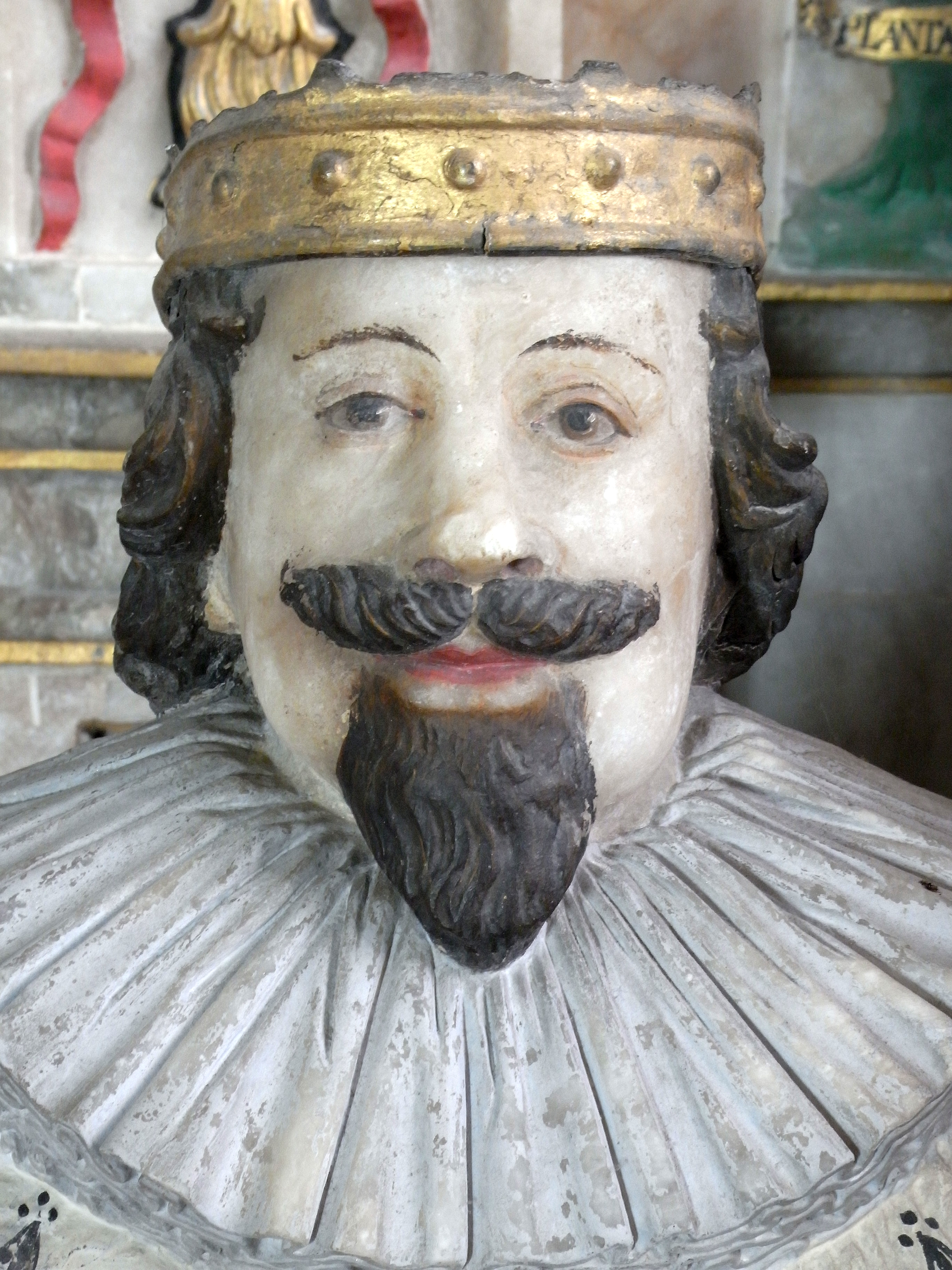
Detail from effigy of Edward Bourchier, 4th Earl of Bath (d.1636) shown as a kneeling mourner beside the monument to his father William Bourchier, 3rd Earl of Bath (d.1623), Tawstock Church, Devon

Canting arms of Bourchier: Argent, a cross engrailed gules between four water bougets sable

Edward Bourchier, 4th Earl of Bath (baptised 1 March 1590 – died 31 March 1636).

== Origins ==
He was born in Somerset, the eldest son and heir of William Bourchier, 3rd Earl of Bath by his second wife Elizabeth Russell, daughter of Francis Russell, 2nd Earl of Bedford by Margaret Long.

== Education ==
He was educated at Caius College, Cambridge.

== Marriages and children ==
He married twice:

- Firstly on 14 July 1623 to his second cousin Dorothy St John (d.20 August 1632), daughter of Oliver St John, 3rd Baron St John of Bletso by his wife Dorothy Read (alias Rede) daughter and heiress of Sir John Rede. By his wife he had a son who died as an infant and predeceased his father, and three surviving daughters, eventual co-heiresses to the Bourchier estates, but not to the earldom, when his cousin and heir male Henry Bourchier, 5th Earl of Bath died childless in 1654:
  - John Bourchier, styled Lord FitzWarin (21 January 1630 – October 1631), son and heir apparent, died as an infant aged 1 year and predeceased his father.
  - Lady Elizabeth Bourchier (1626 – 22 September 1670), eldest daughter, who married Basil Feilding, 2nd Earl of Denbigh, without children.
  - Lady Dorothy Bourchier (1627–1659), 2nd daughter, who married firstly Thomas, Lord Grey of Groby and was the mother of Thomas Grey, 2nd Earl of Stamford; secondly to Gustavus Mackworth, by whom she had issue.
  - Lady Anne Bourchier (1631–?), 3rd daughter, who married firstly James Cranfield, 2nd Earl of Middlesex (1621–1651), the two daughters of which marriage died young; secondly to Sir Chichester Wray, 3rd Baronet (1628–1668), of Trebeigh in the parish of St Ive, Cornwall and of North Russell in the parish of Sourton, Devon, whose descendants, on the death of the 5th Earl of Bath in 1654, inherited the principal Bourchier seat of Tawstock.
- Secondly, in 1633, to Ann Lovett, daughter of Sir Robert Lovett of Liscombe in the parish of Soulbury in Buckinghamshire, by his wife, Anne Saunders, daughter of Richard Saunders of Dinton. Without children. She survived her husband and remarried to Baptist Noel, 3rd Viscount Campden (1611–1682).

== Succession ==
Edward and Dorothy's only son, William (11 April 1624 – 19 February 1689) refused the Earldom and retired to a quiet life in the country, and he was succeeded by his father's first cousin, Henry Bourchier, 5th Earl of Bath (1587–1654), who died childless whereupon the title Earl of Bath became extinct and the titles Baron FitzWarin and Baron Daubeny (if it in fact existed) fell into abeyance between his three daughters.

== Death and burial ==
Amongst his possessions at his death was the Illyrian armorial with the arms of the families and surnames of Albania, Bosnia, Bulgaria, Croatia, Dalmatia, Macedonia, Montenegro, Serbia and Slavonia from the Armorial of Stanislas Rubčić, King of Arms to Tsar Stephen Uroš IV Dušan of Serbia.

== Sources ==
- Cokayne, The Complete Peerage, new edition, Vol II, pp. 15–19, Earldom of Bath.

Peerage of England
Preceded by William Bourchier	Earl of Bath; 1623–1636	Succeeded by Henry Bourchier
