= David des Granges =

English painter

David des Granges (baptised 1611, d. in or before c.1672) was an Anglo-French miniature painter.

== Life ==
The son of Samson de Granges and his wife Marie Bouvier, he was baptised twice, first on 24 March 1611, at the French church on Threadneedle Street, with Esther des Granges the wife of Elias Le Tellier as witness, and later at St Ann Blackfriars. He married in 1636 and moved from the parish of St Ann Blackfriars to Long Acre, where he was living again at the end of his life, c.1672.

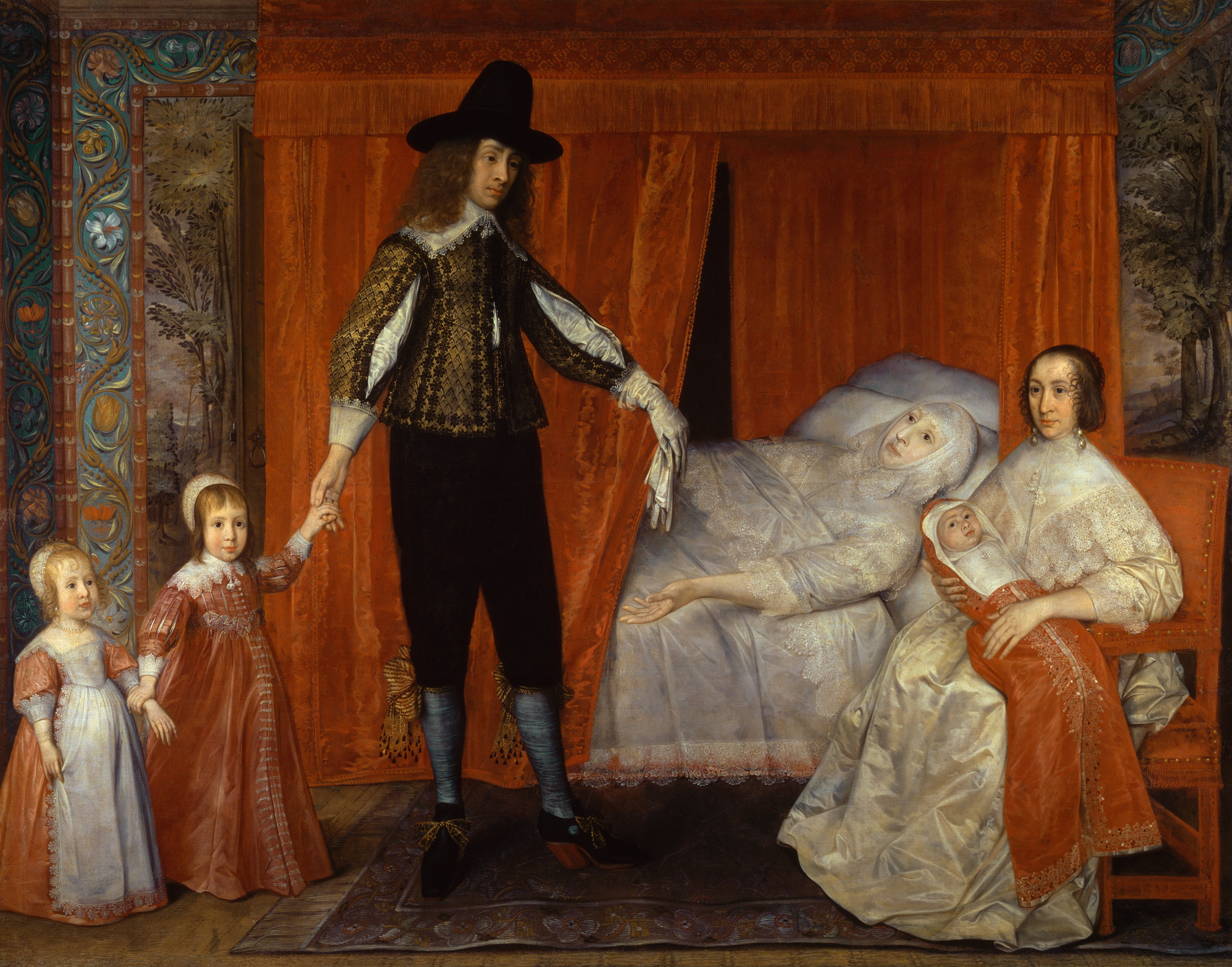
The Saltonstall Family attributed to David des Granges, Tate

Des Granges was initially influenced as a miniature painter by John Hoskins and Peter Oliver. Contemporaries attest that he worked also as an engraver, and in oils; he is thought to have been involved in the copying of miniatures, a form of production that became important with the outbreak of the English Civil War and the demand for tokens of loyalty. Des Granges was with Charles II in Scotland in the early 1650s, copying a likeness of Charles by Adriaen Hanneman.

After the English Restoration of 1660, Des Granges was influenced by the court painter Jacob Huysmans, and possibly also Samuel Cooper. He was considered a leading artist of his time, but his authentic works are not now easy to identify.
