= Lord Buckhurst =

Lord Buckhurst is a courtesy title or style used since 1890 by heirs apparent to the title of Earl De La Warr. The style was previously used by heirs apparent to the title of Earl of Dorset.

Lord Buckhurst may also refer to:

== Peers and nobles ==
=== Dorset ===
- Thomas Sackville, 1st Earl of Dorset (1536–1608), styled Lord Buckhurst from 1567 to 1604
- Robert Sackville, 2nd Earl of Dorset (1561–1609), styled Lord Buckhurst from 1604 to 1608
- Richard Sackville, 3rd Earl of Dorset (1589–1624), styled Lord Buckhurst from 1608 to 1609
- Richard Sackville, 5th Earl of Dorset (1622–1677), styled Lord Buckhurst from birth to 1652
- Charles Sackville, 6th Earl of Dorset (1643–1706), styled Lord Buckhurst from 1652 to 1677
- Lionel Sackville, 1st Duke of Dorset (1688–1765), styled Lord Buckhurst from birth to 1706
- Charles Sackville, 2nd Duke of Dorset (1711–1769), styled Lord Buckhurst from 1711 to 1720

=== De La Warr ===
- Reginald Sackville, 7th Earl De La Warr (1817–1896), 2nd Baron Buckhurst, inherited title of Lord Buckhurst in 1870 and Earldom in 1873
- Herbrand Sackville, 9th Earl De La Warr (1900–1976), styled Lord Buckhurst from birth to 1915
- William Sackville, 10th Earl De La Warr (1921–1988), styled Lord Buckhurst from birth to 1976
- William Sackville, 11th Earl De La Warr (born 1948), styled Lord Buckhurst from 1976 to 1988
- William Sackville, Lord Buckhurst (born 1979), styled Lord Buckhurst since 1988

== Titles ==
- Baron Buckhurst, a barony first created in 1567, held as a subsidiary title by the Earls of Dorset; recreated in 1864 and merged since 1873 with the De La Warr earldom

== See also ==
- Buckhurst Park, Sussex, seat of the Earls De La Warr, held by Sackville family since 1140
- Elizabeth Sackville-West, Countess De La Warr (1795–1870), created 1st Baroness Buckhurst in 1864
