= William Sackville =

William Sackville is the name of:

- Sir William Sackville (died 1592), English army officer in the service of Henry IV of France
- William Sackville, 10th Earl De La Warr (1921–1988), British peer
- William Sackville, 11th Earl De La Warr (born 1948), British peer
- William Sackville, Lord Buckhurst (born 1979), son and heir of William Sackville, 11th Earl De La Warr
