= Withyham =

Village and parish in East Sussex, England

Coordinates: 51.100°N 0.132°E

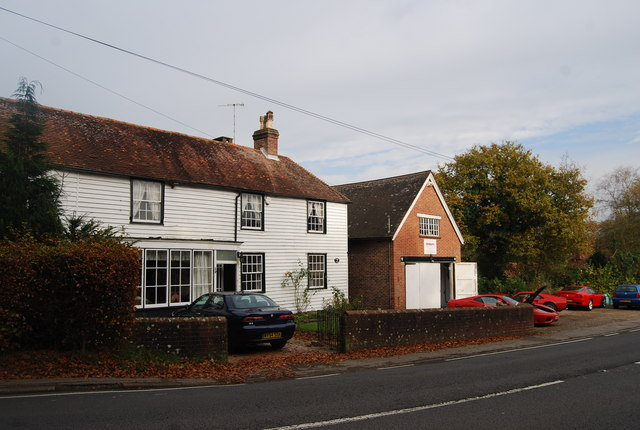
- Withyham

- Location within East Sussex
- Area: 36.8 km^{2} (14.2 sq mi)
- Population: 2,654 (2011)
  - Density: 187/sq mi (72/km^{2})
- OS grid reference: TQ495356
  - London: 30 miles (48 km) NNW
- District: Wealden
- Shire county: East Sussex
- Region: South East
- Country: England
- Sovereign state: United Kingdom
- Post town: HARTFIELD
- Postcode district: TN7
- Dialling code: 01892
- Police: Sussex
- Fire: East Sussex
- Ambulance: South East Coast
- UK Parliament: Wealden

Withyham is a village and large civil parish in the Wealden district of East Sussex, England. The village is situated 7 miles south west of Royal Tunbridge Wells and 3.5 miles (5.6 km) from Crowborough; the parish covers approximately 7,500 acres (30 km^{2}).

== Geography ==
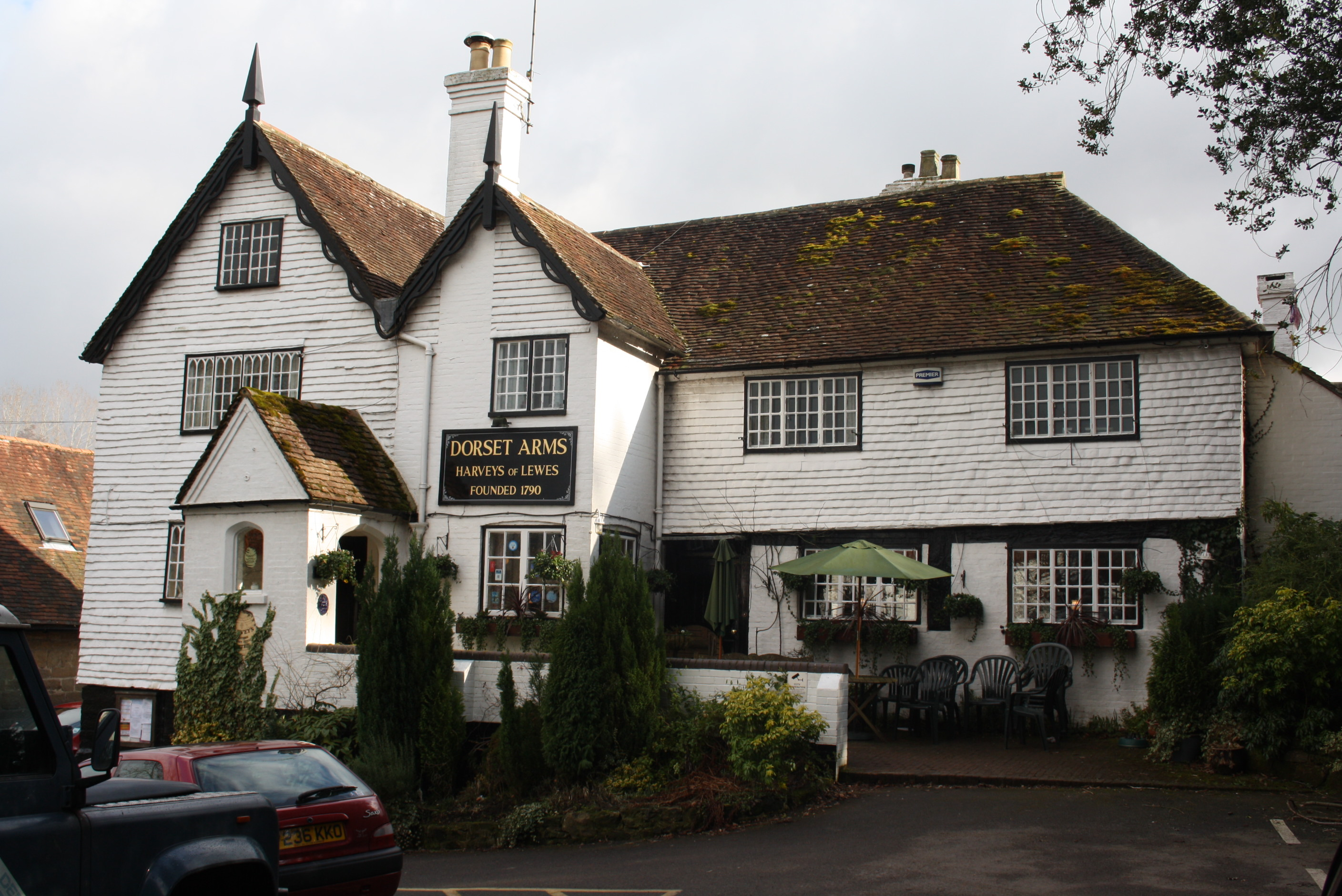
Dorset Arms

Withyham parish lies on the edge of Weald, in the valley of the River Medway, where a group of tributaries enter from the south, and to the north of Ashdown Forest. The B2110 road passes through the village, between Groombridge and Forest Row. Much of the area is rural; the hamlet of Buckhurst, part of the parish, contains Buckhurst Park, the home of Lord De La Warr. New Groombridge is also within the parish, and Old Groombridge is in the Speldhurst parish of Kent.

Withyham village itself is very small, containing a few houses, the church, a bed and breakfast, and the Dorset Arms (a village pub which was once a farmhouse).

== History ==
=== Buckhurst and Gildredge ===
Withyham is not included in the Domesday Book, although the manor of Buckhurst is, as "Biochest" (probably from the Saxon "boc hyrst" or beech wood. There have been two houses at Buckhurst for many centuries: the older Buckhurst House, now no more, and the present day Buckhurst Park: both remained in the hands of the Sackville family for generations. Buckhurst Park is the family seat of the De La Warr earldom, and William Sackville, 11th Earl De La Warr continues to live there.

Outside Buckhurst, many of the houses in the village were probably built to contain estate workers. A significant number of council houses were built in the post-war period at Balls Green, near a now-closed railway station.

Withyham was also home to the Gildredge family, who later moved to Eastbourne, acquiring a large share of the town's land by purchase and through marriage. "Gildredge House and estate was formerly the property and residence of the family of the same name," says Thomas Walker Horsfield in his history of Sussex, "who afterwards (temp. Henry VIII) removed to and became lords of the manor of Eastbourne." Today's Gildredge Park in Eastbourne is named after the family. The Gildredge family was related to the Eversfield family, who eventually owned much of St. Leonards-on-Sea, as well as to the Levetts.

According to the Sussex historian Mark Antony Lower, the ancient house and estate of Gildredge "gave name to a family of considerable antiquity, who subsequently had their chief residence at Eastbourne, and gave their name to the manor of Eastbourne-Gildredge." Later the Gildredge lands were carried by marriage into the Gilbert family (today's Davies-Gilbert family), who continue to own much of Eastbourne.

Withyham parish is in an Area of Outstanding Natural Beauty.

=== Withyham church ===
Much of the oldest available historical information concerning the Weald of Kent, Sussex and Surrey, with records going back to 1288, relates to the parish church, St. Michael's.

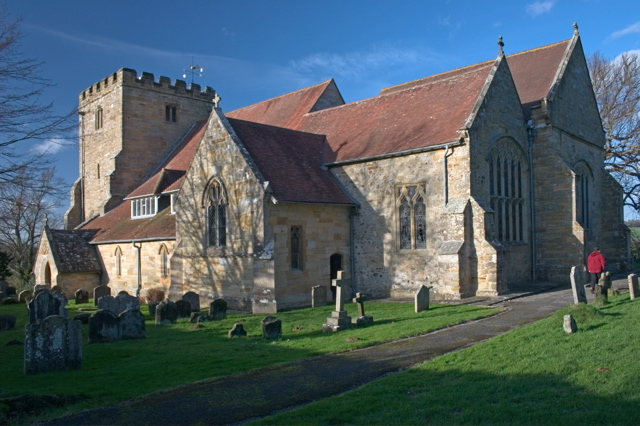
St Michael and All Angels Church, Withyham

The village church is dedicated to St Michael and All Angels; the present rector is the Reverend Canon James Campbell. According to early records, the church was almost completely rebuilt in the 14th century to contain a Sackville chapel.

On 16 June 1663 the church was struck by lightning, which melted the bells and caused a great deal of damage; few parts of the building survived. The rebuilding of the church does not seem to have been finished until 1672, and the Sackville Chapel was not completed for a further eight years. Of the old church, only the lower part of the tower, the west wall from the belfry door to the north-west corner, and the north and south-east walls remained to be incorporated into the new building. It was also around this time that the rectory was built.

Later important alterations were carried out in the 19th century, including a new south aisle, the removal of the low ceiling, and the construction of a new south porch. In 1849, a set of four paintings was donated to the church: it is thought they are the work of Niccolò di Pietro Gerini (c. 1340–1414). The paintings were sold at Sotheby's in London in 2012.

There are eight bells in the tower. Five bells were recast after the rebuilding in 1674, and a sixth (treble) bell was added in 1715. These bells remained until 1908, when they were recast and a further two added.

The ashes of David Maxwell Fyfe, 1st Earl of Kilmuir are buried at the church. Richard Sackville, 3rd Earl of Dorset is buried there as well, as are the ashes of author and garden designer, Vita Sackville-West.

Scottish architect and watercolourist Charles Rennie Mackintosh painted a watercolour while in the village in 1909, calling it "Spurge, Withyham". The painting (drawing, painting and watercolour on paper) hangs in the Hunterian Art Gallery, Glasgow.

The church is also a filming location used in the 1976 concert film The Song Remains the Same featuring the English rock band Led Zeppelin. It is the location for the night time fantasy scene starring Led Zeppelin's bass and keyboard player John Paul Jones.

== Governance ==
Withyham is a large parish, and is therefore divided into three electoral wards: Groombridge; Withyham, including Blackham; and St Johns (Withyham).

== Landmarks ==
Penn's Rocks is a Site of Special Scientific Interest within the parish. This is a site of biological interest. Its sandstone outcrops providing a rare habitat for many ferns and bryophytes. Buckhurst Park, historic seat of the Earls De La Warr, head of the Sackville family, Lutyens/Jekyll garden with Repton Park. The Hundred Acre wood, immortalised by A.A. Milne in his Winnie-the-Pooh stories, is part of the Buckhurst Estate

== The millennium in Withyham ==
To celebrate the millennium in Withyham, the 11th Earl De La Warr planted a yew sapling taken from a tree said to be 2,000 years old – i.e. from the time of Christ. The sapling was uprooted by vandals, but was replanted by Earl De La Warr. A millennium map was also commissioned by the Church to commemorate almost 1,000 years of Withyham.

== Public transport ==
The village has a regular bus service. The Metrobus 291 bus route serves East Grinstead, Tunbridge Wells, and Crawley – as well as neighbouring villages.

In nearby Ashurst there is a railway station. Ashurst station is on the Uckfield to London line via Oxted and East Croydon. Trains are hourly in each direction.

== See also ==
- Withyham Priory
