= John West, 6th Baron De La Warr =

English nobleman

John West, 6th Baron De La Warr (1663 – 26 May 1723) was an English nobleman and courtier. He is alternatively described as the 15th Baron de la Warr and as Baron Delaware.

He was born the second son of Charles West, 5th Baron De La Warr and inherited his title on the death of his father in 1687. (His elder brother, Charles, MP for Andover, predeceased the 5th Baron in 1684.)

In 1697, he was appointed Groom of the Stool to Prince George of Denmark, the husband of Queen Anne, an office he held until Prince George's death in 1708. He held the office of Treasurer of the Chamber to Queen Anne from 1713 to 1714 and, on the accession of George I, was made a Teller of the Exchequer (1714–15). He was afterwards a Treasurer of the Excise.

He died in London in 1723 and was buried in St Margaret's Church, Westminster. He had married Margaret Freeman, daughter of the merchant John Freeman. Their son John became a senior Army officer and was raised to the rank of Earl. Their daughter Elizabeth married Thomas Digges of Chilham Castle, Kent.

Honorary titles
Preceded by The Viscount Fitzhardinge	Treasurer of the Chamber; 1713–1714	Succeeded by The Earl of Radnor
Preceded by Russell Robartes	Teller of the Exchequer; 1714–1715	Succeeded by Sir Richard Onslow
Peerage of England
Preceded by Charles West	Baron De La Warr; 1687–1723	Succeeded by John West
