= Charles West, 5th Baron De La Warr =

English nobleman

Charles West, 5th Baron De La Warr (February 1626 – 22 December 1687) was an English nobleman. He is alternatively described as the 14th Baron de la Warr and as Baron Delaware.

He was born in February 1626, the son of Henry West, 4th Baron De La Warr and Isabella, first daughter and coheiress of Sir Thomas Edmondes, Treasurer of the Household.

On 25 September 1642 he married Anne Wilde, daughter of John Wilde SL of Droitwich.

He died on 22 December 1687. His oldest son Charles West MP (1645–1684) having precedeased him, he was succeeded by his second son John West, 6th Baron De La Warr.

Peerage of England
| Preceded by Henry West | Baron De La Warr; 1628–1687 | Succeeded by John West |
