= William Sackville, Lord Buckhurst =

British businessman (born 1979)

Lord Buckhurst
- Born: 13 June 1979 (age 47)
- Education: Eton College; Newcastle University (BA (Hons))
- Spouse: Countess Xenia Tolstoy-Miloslavsky (m. 2010)
- Children: 2
- Parent(s): William Sackville, 11th Earl De La Warr; Anne Pamela Leveson
- Family: De La Warr
- Baron Buckhurst
Names
- William Herbrand Thomas Sackville

William Herbrand Thomas Sackville, Lord Buckhurst (born 13 June 1979), is the son and heir of William Sackville, 11th Earl De La Warr. He was styled Lord Buckhurst on 9 February 1988, upon his father's succession to the earldom.

Buckhurst is a godson of Princess Margaret, Countess of Snowdon. He was educated at Eton, and graduated from Newcastle University with a BA (Hons) in Classical Studies.

He began his career in the City of London in 2002 at Laing & Cruickshank Investment Management, which was acquired by UBS Wealth Management in 2004. In 2006, he joined the investment firm Quilter Cheviot, where he managed an investment fund and private client portfolios. Buckhurst left Quilter Cheviot in 2018.

In September 2009, Buckhurst became engaged to Countess Xenia Tolstoy-Miloslavsky, daughter of author and historian Count Nikolai Tolstoy-Miloslavsky, distantly related to author Leo Tolstoy.

The marriage took place on 5 February 2010, at the Russian Orthodox Cathedral of the Dormition in London. A son and heir, William Lionel Robert Sackville, was born on 24 January 2014. Their second child, a daughter, Victoria Elizabeth Anne Sackville, was born on 6 June 2016.
