= Buckhurst Park, East Sussex =

English country house and park in East Sussex

Coordinates: 51.0950°N 0.1418°E

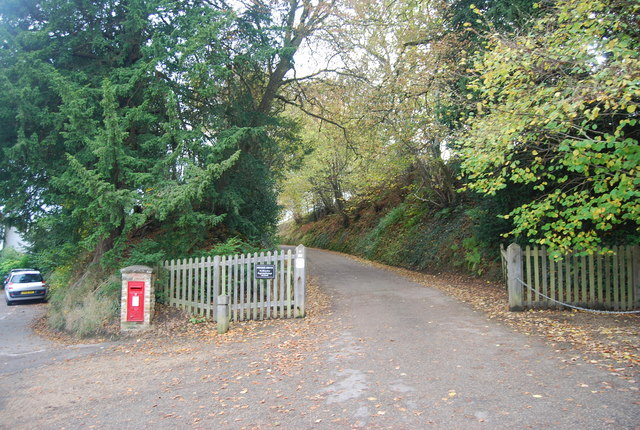
Private drive to Buckhurst Park

Buckhurst Park is an English country house and landscaped park in Withyham, East Sussex TN7 4BL. It is the seat of William Sackville, 11th Earl De La Warr.

The house is a Grade II listed building, and is open to the public. The park, landscaped by Humphry Repton, is Grade II* listed in the National Register of Historic Parks and Gardens. There are formal gardens which were laid out by Edwin Lutyens and planted by Gertrude Jekyll.

== Early history ==
In the year 1086, according to the 11th Earl De La Warr, Buckhurst formed part of an estate that was recorded in the Domesday Book as belonging to "Ralph de Dene (whose grandfather was cupbearer to King Edward the Confessor) that... passed to the Sackville family – Lords Buckhurst, Earls and Dukes of Dorset, and Earls De La Warr – through the marriage of Ralph's descendant, Ela de Dene to Jordan de Sackville in 1140."

The 7th Earl De La Warr, writing in 1857, recorded that a well-built dwelling house and garden had been mentioned in 1274, and that a deer park on the estate was mentioned in the 14th century, during the reign of Edward I.

A land survey of the Barony of Buckhurst in 1597–1598 recorded that Lord Buckhurst's property was divided into two parks: the Great Park of Buckhurst and the Little Park of Buckhurst, which were also called Buckhurst Park and Stonelands Park. The original mansion stood in Buckhurst Park, on 1,150 acres of "land in meadow pasture and wood... [and] for the sustenance and maintenance of deere". Stonelands Park contained 520 wooded acres including Stonelands Lodge, a hunting lodge consisting of a house with a barn and a garden; a relation, Andrew Sackville, resided there as the keeper of the park.

Buckhurst Place, the original manor house, was a grand, partly-moated courtyard house in Buckhurst Park. The beauties of the house and estate in 1579 were praised in a Latin poem by the Scottish academic Hercules Rollock. Buckhurst was the home of the Sackville family until it was vacated in the early 1600s by Thomas Sackville, 1st Earl of Dorset. Thomas Sackville was a cousin of Queen Elizabeth I through the family of her mother, Anne Boleyn. His court connections resulted in a considerable fortune, enabling him to keep a household staff of at least 220, and to draw up plans for a new and more elaborate mansion on the Buckhurst estate, even prior to his elevation to the titles of Lord Buckhurst and Earl of Dorset.

The building was abandoned by about 1605, after Thomas Sackville removed his family and household from Buckhurst Place to Knole House in Kent, a large palace granted to him by Queen Elizabeth in 1566. Much of Buckhurst Place was pulled down early in the 17th century, and its materials were employed around 1616–1619 to build an almshouse called College for the Poor (now Sackville College) at East Grinstead, leaving the gateway tower as the only remnant standing.

== Stoneland and Buckhurst Park ==
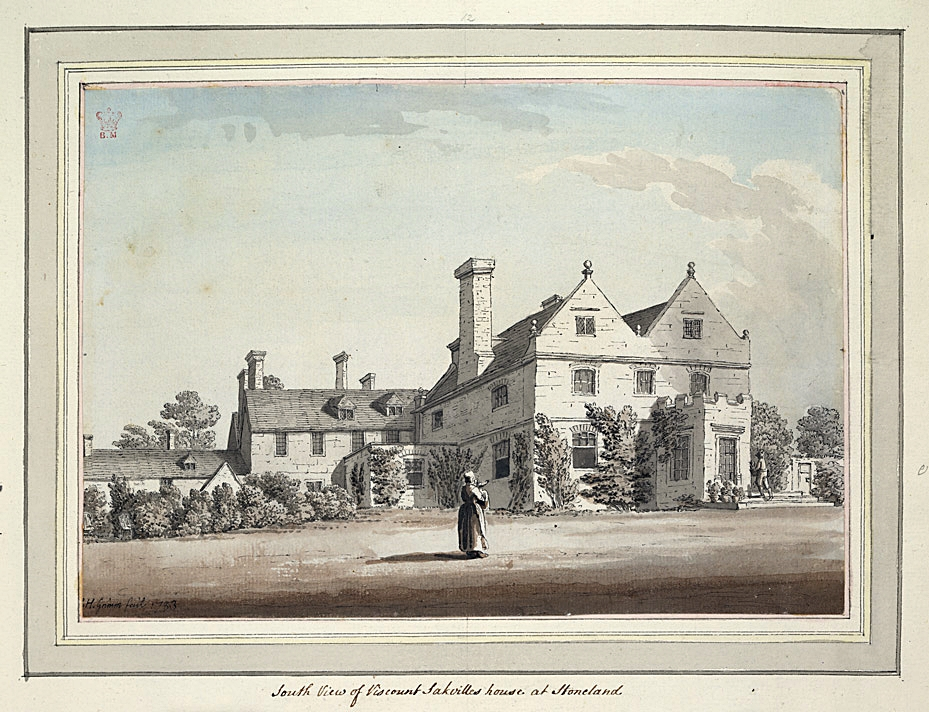
Stoneland Lodge, now Buckhurst House, in 1783

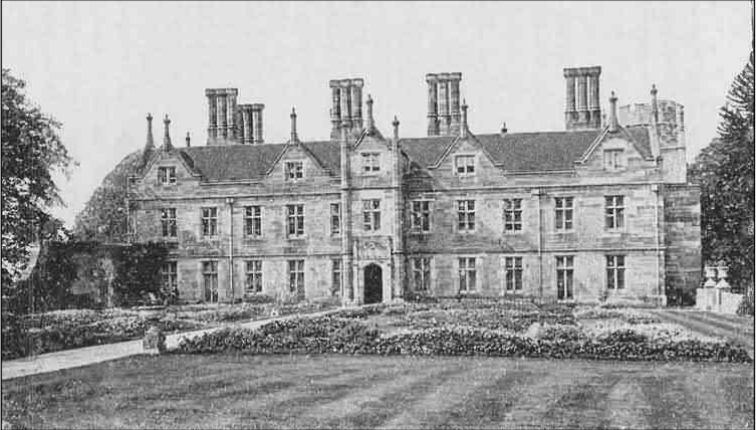
Buckhurst House c.1900

Buckhurst Park 2026

After moving to Knole House, Sackville continued with plans to build a new house at Buckhurst. Construction of the new house, called "Stoneland," was started in 1603, taking the site of Stoneland Lodge, the former hunting lodge in the smaller park. Upon Sackville's death in 1608, his son Robert Sackville, 2nd Earl of Dorset, reduced the scope of the original plans but continued construction of a substantial mansion, designed as a residence for the steward, with no formal garden.

The residence received considerable additions in the mid-18th century by Lionel Sackville, 1st Duke of Dorset, who used Stoneland as an occasional summer retreat. The present house is dated to that period; according to the Sussex Record Society, the "former Stoneland Lodge, now called Buckhurst House, [was] built in 1743". The Duke of Dorset's third son, George Germain, 1st Viscount Sackville, took the house as his summer residence until his death in 1785.

The house has since been much remodelled, notably in the early 19th century by an Elizabethan-style renovation for Arabella, Duchess of Dorset and her second husband, Lord Whitworth, who occupied the house and improved both it and the grounds. The Duchess incorporated into the house's grounds a portion of the larger park which had belonged to Buckhurst Place, and discarded the name Stoneland, giving to the entire estate the name Buckhurst Park.

Buckhurst Park was landscaped in 1830–1835 by Humphry Repton, whose landscape plans for the park were embodied in one of his "Red Books", and the remodelling of the house was carried out to designs by his son, John Adey Repton. The Duchess of Dorset also commissioned a lakeside walk of shrubs and ornamental trees, along with a boathouse, from landscape designer Lewis Kennedy, noted for the Empress Josephine's formal gardens at Château de Malmaison.

In the early decades of the 20th century, the estate was leased for over 25 years to Robert Henry Benson (1850–1929), a merchant banker and art collector, who continued to make improvements to the house. Finding the house and grounds very much as Repton had left them, in 1902 he called upon architect Edwin Lutyens to add an extensive wing. Lutyens later credited his decades-long appointment as architect of New Delhi, the grand central area of which is still known as Lutyens' Delhi, to a chance meeting at a country-house party at Buckhurst during Benson's tenure.

The wing added by Lutyens has since been demolished, but a sunken basin opposite its former "New Room" survives, and surrounding gardens by Gertrude Jekyll adjoining it were later carefully recreated from Jekyll's planting plans, rediscovered in a drawer at Buckhurst. Lutyens' preferred Brunswick fig trees also survived the demolition.

As of 2018, Buckhurst Park is owned by the 11th Earl De La Warr, and is made available to the public for weddings, corporate events, and a variety of outdoor pursuits. Herds of cattle, sheep, and pigs are raised on the estate, and Lady De La Warr is the owner of South Park Stud, which breeds pedigreed Shetland ponies on the estate.

== The Hundred Acre Wood ==
Within the Buckhurst Park estate is the "Hundred Acre Wood," an area that was separated from Ashdown Forest by disafforestation in 1678, when Stoneland was in the possession of Charles Sackville, 6th Earl of Dorset. The writer A. A. Milne, who lived nearby at Cotchford Farm, Hartfield, made the Hundred Acre Wood famous as the setting of the Winnie-the-Pooh stories.
