= William Sackville, 10th Earl De La Warr =

British aristocrat and politician (1921–1988)

The Right Honourable The Earl De La Warr DL
- Born: 16 October 1921
- Died: 9 February 1988 (aged 66); London, England
- Spouse: Anne Rachel Devas (m. 1946)
- Children: 3, including William and Thomas
- Father: Herbrand Sackville, 9th Earl De La Warr

William Herbrand Sackville, 10th Earl De La Warr DL (/ˈdɛləwɛər/ 16 October 1921 – 9 February 1988) was a British peer. He inherited the earldom on 28 January 1976 on the death of his father Herbrand Edward Dundonald Brassey Sackville, 9th Earl De La Warr.

Earl De La Warr was educated at Eton College, and fought in World War II, attaining the rank of captain in the Parachute Regiment of the British Army. After the war, on 18 May 1946, he married Anne Rachel Devas (grandniece of a former Prime Minister, Sir Henry Campbell-Bannerman). They had three children:

- William Herbrand Sackville, 11th Earl De La Warr, born 10 April 1948
- Thomas Geoffrey Sackville, born 26 October 1950
- Lady Arabella Avice Diana Sackville, 20 June 1958 – 18 June 2022

In September 1981, the Earl allowed Doctor Who to film on his large tranche of Ashdown Forest for the episode "Black Orchid".

In the autumn of 1987, the earl offered to sell that forest, the direct inspiration for the Winnie-the-Pooh stories, to the East Sussex County Council at a below-market price of £1.2 million for the 6,500 acres (2,600 ha). As young children, the future earl and Christopher Robin Milne had played together there. Milne himself joined conservationists to prevent the forest from being sold piecemeal to private owners, and to oppose BP's plan to prospect and extract oil there. The sale to the council was concluded after the earl's death, making the forest public land.

On 9 February 1988, at age 66, Earl De La Warr died after falling under a train at the St James's Park station of the London Underground. An inquest ruled the death to be a suicide, with a jury finding that the earl had been "anxious and upset over hurricane damage to his estate".

Peerage of Great Britain
Preceded by Herbrand Edward Dundonald Brassey Sackville	Earl De La Warr; 1976–1988	Succeeded by William Herbrand Sackville
