= William Sackville, 11th Earl De La Warr =

British businessman and peer

The Right Honourable The Earl De La Warr
- Full name: William Herbrand Sackville
- Other titles: 17th Baron Delaware; 6th Baron Buckhurst; 11th Viscount Cantelupe
- Born: 10 April 1948 (age 78)
- Noble family: De La Warr
- Spouses: Anne Leveson, Countess of Hopetoun (m. 1978)
- Issue: William Herbrand Thomas Sackville (age 47); Edward Geoffrey Richard Sackville (age 45)
- Father: William Sackville, 10th Earl De La Warr
- Mother: Anne Rachel Devas

William Herbrand Sackville, 11th Earl De La Warr DL (/ˈdɛləwɛər/ DEL-ə-wair; born 10 April 1948) is a British businessman and peer. He was styled Lord Buckhurst from 1976 until 9 February 1988, when he inherited the earldom.

== Early life ==
The son of William Sackville, later 10th Earl De La Warr, the young William Sackville was educated at Eton College.

== Career ==
In 1976, Lord Buckhurst, as he then was, began a financial career in the City of London as an investment banker at Mullens & Co. For 24 years, he was a director of Laing & Cruickshank and later of its owner Credit Lyonnais Securities, for which he worked in equity sales and published a tip sheet called The Earl's Earner. He was later a director of Shore Capital, working with its natural resources team in sales, and also became a director of Cluff Natural Resources. In April 2016, he joined the hedge fund Toscafund Asset Management as a partner.

Beyond his work in the City of London, De La Warr is a dairy farmer and as of 2016 was still breeding livestock at his family seat, Buckhurst Park, East Sussex.

In 2009, De La Warr began to hire out the library and an adjacent drawing room of Buckhurst Park for weddings, as a way of "adapting to stay afloat", in response to Britain's then-current economic crisis. The house and the estate were subsequently made available to the public for corporate events and outdoor pursuits, as well as weddings.

== Personal life ==
In 1978, De La Warr married Anne Pamela, Countess of Hopetoun. Born Anne Pamela Leveson, she is a granddaughter of Admiral Sir Arthur Cavenagh Leveson and has two sons by her previous marriage to the 4th Marquess of Linlithgow. In 1988 she became Countess De La Warr and is the owner of South Park Stud, which breeds pedigree Shetland ponies on the Buckhurst Park estate.

Issue:

- William Herbrand Thomas Sackville, Lord Buckhurst (born 13 June 1979), is a hedge fund manager in the City of London, and heir to the earldom. In 2010, he married Countess Xenia Tolstoy-Miloslavsky.
  - William Lionel Robert Sackville, was born on 24 January 2014.
  - Victoria Elizabeth Anne was born on 6 June 2016.
- Edward Geoffrey Richard Sackville (born 6 December 1980), is a bloodstock agent who co-owns international bloodstock agency SackvilleDonald. In 2013 he married Sophia Georgina Milton Akroyd.
  - Viola Idina Edith Sackville was born in July 2013.
  - Arthur Edward Mark Sackville was born in June 2015.

De La Warr is a member of White's, the Turf Club, and Pratt's.

De La Warr said in 2015, "I've spent most of my life hunting down the perfect sausage", and an authorized profile in Debrett's People of Today listed his recreations as "country pursuits, sausages". For a decade, he undertook to "resurrect an extinct sausage" that was a favourite of his childhood. The result became the Buckhurst Park sausage, a product made by Speldhurst Quality Foods, in which De La Warr owned a stake, sold nationally in Waitrose supermarkets.

In October 2021, De La Warr bought the original Poohsticks Bridge for some £131,000 (equivalent to about £162,000 in 2025), intending to give it "pride of place" in Buckhurst Park but later had to sell it given the high restoration costs.

== See also ==
- Buckhurst Park, Sussex, family seat of the Earls De La Warr

Peerage of Great Britain
Preceded by William Herbrand Sackville	Earl De La Warr; 1988–present	Incumbent
