= Earl De La Warr =

Earldom in the Peerage of Great Britain

Earldom of De La Warr
- Blazon: Quarterly: 1st, argent a fess dancettée sable (for West); 2nd: azure three leopard's heads reversed jessant-de-lys or (for Cantelupe); 3rd: gules crusilly and a lion argent (for La Warr); 4th, quarterly or and gules a bend vair (for Sackville)
- Creation date: 18 March 1761
- Created by: George III
- Peerage: Peerage of Great Britain
- First holder: John West, 7th Baron De La Warr
- Present holder: William Sackville, 11th Earl De La Warr
- Heir apparent: William Sackville, Baron Buckhurst
- Subsidiary titles: Viscount Cantelupe; Baron De La Warr; Baron Buckhurst
- Former seat: Bourn Hall
- Motto: Jour de ma vie ("Day of my life")

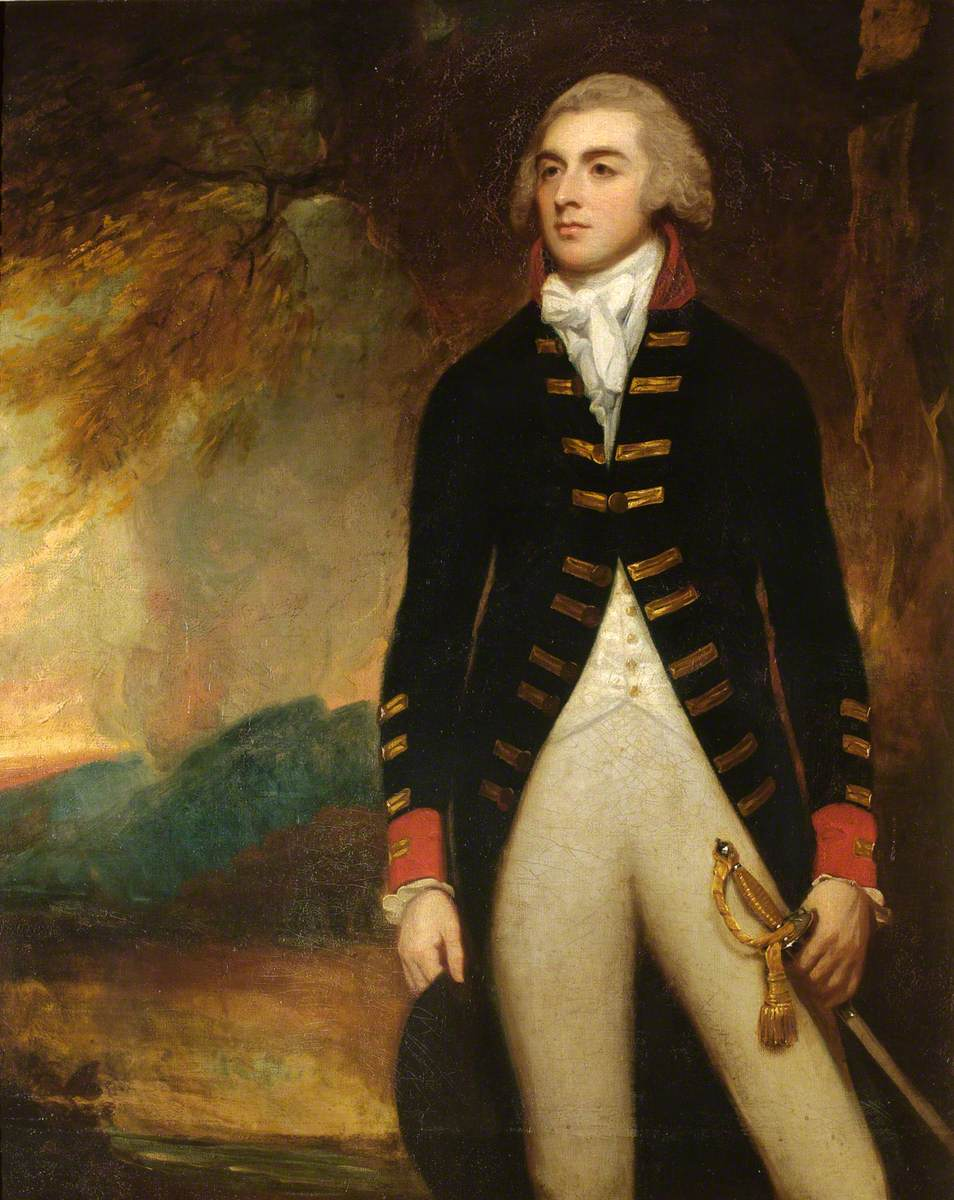
A portrait of John West, 4th Earl De La Warr

Earl De La Warr (/ˈdɛləwɛər/ DEL-ə-wair) is a title in the Peerage of Great Britain. It was created in 1761 for John West, 7th Baron De La Warr. The Earl holds the subsidiary titles of Viscount Cantelupe (1761) in the Peerage of Great Britain, Baron De La Warr (1570) in the Peerage of England, and Baron Buckhurst (1864) in the Peerage of the United Kingdom.

The Earls De La Warr descend from Roger De La Warr (d. 1320), of Isfield, Sussex, and Wickwar, Gloucestershire, who was made a baron by Edward I in 1299. The male line failed on the death of the 5th Baron De La Warr in 1426, and the title passed to the latter's nephew, Reginald West. It fell into abeyance with the death of Thomas West, 9th Baron De La Warr, in 1554. Thomas had named his nephew William as his heir, but had disinherited him when William tried to obtain his inheritance early by poisoning his uncle. An Act of Parliament was passed in 1550 to prevent William from inheriting the barony. Elizabeth I restored the title to him in 1570. This was regarded as a new creation, and William hence sat in the House of Lords as junior baron, but his son and heir was able to claim the precedence associated with the original title.

The family seat is Buckhurst Park, near Withyham, Sussex.

== Etymology ==
The name De La Warr literally means "of the war" (warr being a Norman form of standard French guerre) and originated as a nickname for a warrior. In the form Delaware, it has been transferred to several places in the United States, including the state of Delaware. All were named either directly or indirectly after the 3rd Baron De La Warr, who served as Virginia's first governor.

The subsidiary title Viscount Cantelupe commemorates the West family's descent from the Anglo-Norman Cantilupe family. In the 14th century Sir Thomas West married Eleanor, heiress of Sir John de Cantilupe. Their son, also Thomas, inherited Hempston Cantilupe and was the father of Thomas West, 1st Baron West.

== Barons De La Warr; first creation (1299) ==
- Roger la Warr, 1st Baron De La Warr (d. 1320)
- John la Warr, 2nd Baron De La Warr (c. 1277–1347)
- Roger la Warr, 3rd Baron De La Warr (c. 1329–1370)
- John la Warr, 4th Baron De La Warr (c. 1344–1398)
- Thomas la Warr, 5th Baron De La Warr (c. 1352–1427)
- Reginald West, 6th Baron De La Warr (c. 1394–1451)
- Richard West, 7th Baron De La Warr (c. 1430–1476)
- Thomas West, 8th Baron De La Warr (c. 1457–1525)
- Thomas West, 9th Baron De La Warr (c. 1475–1554)

== Barons De La Warr; second creation (1570) ==
- William West, 1st Baron De La Warr (1520–1595) (or 10th Baron)
- Thomas West, 2nd Baron De La Warr (1556–1602) (or 11th Baron)
- Thomas West, 3rd Baron De La Warr (1577–1618) (or 12th Baron)
- Henry West, 4th Baron De La Warr (1603–1628) (or 13th Baron)
- Charles West, 5th Baron De La Warr (1626–1687) (or 14th Baron)
- John West, 6th Baron De La Warr (1663–1723) (or 15th Baron)
- John West, 7th Baron De La Warr (1693–1766) (or 16th Baron), who was created Earl De La Warr and Viscount Cantelupe in 1761.

== Earls De La Warr (1761) ==
- John West, 1st Earl De La Warr (1693–1766) (7th Baron)
- John West, 2nd Earl De La Warr (1729–1777)
- William Augustus West, 3rd Earl De La Warr (1757–1783)
- John Richard West, 4th Earl De La Warr (1758–1795)
- George John Sackville-West, 5th Earl De La Warr (1791–1869)
- Charles Richard Sackville West, 6th Earl De La Warr (1815–1873)
- Reginald Windsor Sackville, 7th Earl De La Warr (1817–1896)
- Gilbert George Reginald Sackville, 8th Earl De La Warr (1869–1915)
- Herbrand Edward Dundonald Brassey Sackville, 9th Earl De La Warr (1900–1976)
- William Herbrand Sackville, 10th Earl De La Warr (1921–1988)
- William Herbrand Sackville, 11th Earl De La Warr (b. 1948)

The heir apparent is the present holder's son, William Herbrand Thomas Sackville, Lord Buckhurst (b. 1979), nine generations away from the first Earl.

The heir apparent's heir apparent is his son William Lionel Robert Sackville (b. 2014).

== Other family members ==
Notable 20th-century descendants of the 5th Earl De La Warr include the authors Lady Margaret Sackville, Vita Sackville-West, Nigel Nicolson and Adam Nicolson.

Another member of the West family was William Cornwallis-West (1835–1917), who was the grandson of the Hon. Frederick West, youngest son of the second Earl. Cornwallis-West was the father of George Cornwallis-West; Daisy, Princess of Pless; and Constance, Duchess of Westminster.

== See also ==
- George West, Viscount Cantelupe (1814–1850), eldest son of the 5th Earl De La Warr
