= William Seymour, 3rd Duke of Somerset =

English noble

His Grace The Duke of Somerset
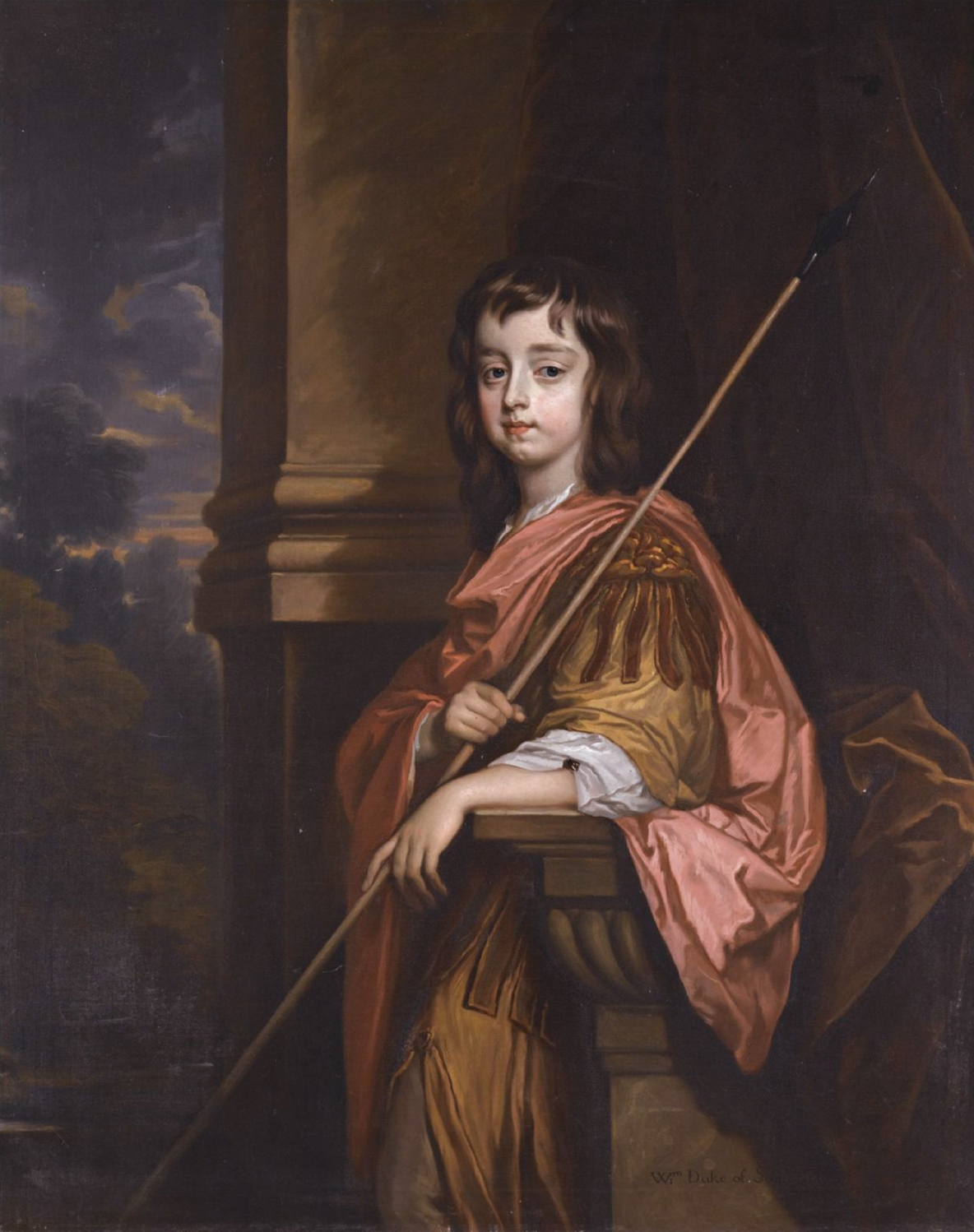
- William Seymour, 3rd Duke of Somerset (c. 1650-1671)

Duke of Somerset
- Tenure: 1660–1671
- Predecessor: William Seymour
- Successor: John Seymour
- Born: William Seymour; 17 April 1652
- Died: 12 December 1671 (aged 19)
- Father: Henry Seymour, Lord Beauchamp
- Mother: Mary Capell

William Seymour, 3rd Duke of Somerset (17 April 1652 – 12 December 1671) was the son of Henry Seymour, Lord Beauchamp, and Mary Capell. As both his father and two elder uncles had predeceased him, he succeeded to the dukedom on the death of his grandfather William Seymour.

He died from malignant fever in 1671, unmarried and childless and was succeeded by his paternal uncle John Seymour.

Peerage of England
Preceded by William Seymour	Duke of Somerset; 1660–1671	Succeeded by John Seymour
