= Earl of Leicester =

Title of nobility

- Arms of Coke, Earls of Leicester: Per pale gules and azure, three eagles displayed argent
- Creation date: 12 August 1837
- Creation: Seventh
- Created by: Queen Victoria
- Peerage: Peerage of the United Kingdom
- First holder: Thomas Coke
- Present holder: Thomas Coke, 8th Earl
- Heir apparent: Edward Coke, Viscount Coke
- Remainder to: the 1st Earl's heirs male of the body lawfully begotten
- Subsidiary titles: Viscount Coke
- Status: Extant
- Seat: Holkham Hall
- Motto: PRUDENS QUI PATIENS ("He is prudent who is patient")

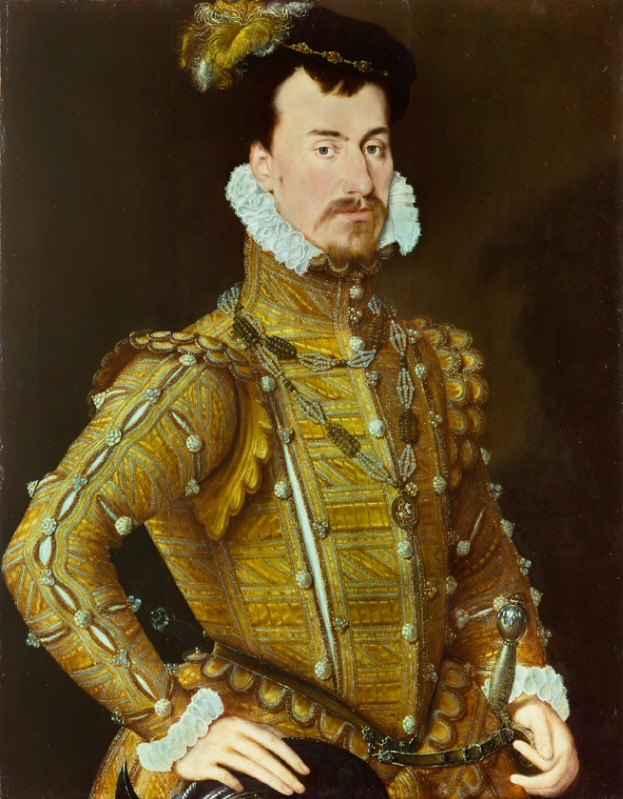
Robert Dudley, created Earl of Leicester in 1564.

Earl of Leicester is a title that has been created seven times. The first title was granted during the 12th century in the Peerage of England. The current title is in the Peerage of the United Kingdom and was created in 1837.

== History ==
=== Early creations ===
The title was first created for Robert de Beaumont (also spelt de Bellomont), but he nearly always used his French title of Count of Meulan. Three generations of his descendants, all also named Robert, called themselves Earls of Leicester. The Beaumont male line ended with the death of the 4th Earl. His property was split between his two sisters, with Simon IV de Montfort, the son of the eldest sister, acquiring Leicester and the rights to the earldom. (The husband of the younger daughter, Saer de Quincy, was created Earl of Winchester.) However, Simon IV de Montfort was never formally recognized as earl, due to the antipathy between France and England at that time. His second son, Simon V de Montfort, did succeed in taking possession of the earldom and its associated properties. He is the Simon de Montfort who became so prominent during the reign of Henry III. He was killed at the Battle of Evesham in 1265, and his lands and titles were forfeited.

In 1267 the title was created a second time and granted to the king's youngest son, Edmund Crouchback. In 1276 he also became Earl of Lancaster, and the titles became united. Crouchback's son Thomas lost the earldom when he was executed for treason in 1322, but a few years later, it was restored to his younger brother Henry. Henry's son Henry of Grosmont left only two daughters, and his estate was divided between them, the eldest daughter Matilda receiving the earldom, which was held by her husband William V of Holland. (The two passages of the earldom via females illustrate the medieval practice by which such inheritance was allowed in the absence of male heirs.) Matilda, however, soon died, and the title passed to John of Gaunt, husband of her younger sister, Blanche, who was later created Duke of Lancaster. Both the dukedom and the earldom were inherited by John of Gaunt's son, Henry Bolingbroke, and both titles ceased to exist when Henry usurped the throne, as the titles "merged into the crown". (The peers are vassals to the Sovereign, and no one can be a vassal to himself.) The properties associated with the earldom became part of what was later called the Duchy of Lancaster.

In 1564 the earldom was again created for Queen Elizabeth I's favourite, Robert Dudley. Since Dudley died without heirs, the title became extinct at his death. The title was again created in 1618 for Robert Sidney (Baron Sydney), his nephew. Prior to being granted the earldom, Robert Sidney was granted the subsidiary title of Viscount Lisle on 4 May 1605. The Sidneys retained the titles until the death of the seventh Earl in 1743, when the titles again became extinct. The title of earl was then recreated for Thomas Coke (pronounced "Cook"), but it became extinct when he, too, died without heirs.

=== 1784 creation ===
The title was again bestowed upon George Townshend, 17th Baron Ferrers of Chartley and 8th Baron Compton, eldest son and heir apparent of George Townshend, 4th Viscount Townshend, later the first Marquess Townshend. Townshend was a female-line great-great-great-grandson of Lady Lucy Sydney, daughter of the second Earl of the 1618 creation. The earldom became extinct yet again upon the death of his son, the third Marquess and second Earl, in 1855 (the marquessate was passed on to a cousin and is extant).

=== 1744 and 1837 creations ===
The Coke family is descended from the noted judge and politician Sir Edward Coke, Lord Chief Justice from 1613 to 1616. Through his son Henry Coke, his great-great-great-grandson Thomas Coke was a landowner, politician and patron of arts. In 1728 he was raised to the Peerage of Great Britain as Baron Lovel, of Minster Lovel in the County of Oxford, and in 1744 he was created Viscount Coke, of Holkham in the County of Norfolk, and Earl of Leicester, also in the Peerage of Great Britain. Lord Leicester began the construction of Holkham Hall in Norfolk. He married Lady Margaret Tufton, 19th Baroness de Clifford (1700—1775) (see the Baron de Clifford for earlier history of this title). Their only child Edward Coke, Viscount Coke, predeceased both his parents, without issue. Consequently, Lord Leicester's titles became extinct on his death in 1759 while the barony of de Clifford fell into abeyance on Lady de Clifford's death in 1775.

The Coke estates were passed on to the late Earl's nephew Wenman Coke. Born Wenman Roberts, he was the son of Philip Roberts and Anne, sister of Lord Leicester, and assumed the surname of Coke in lieu of Roberts. His son Thomas Coke was a politician and noted agriculturalist. Known as "Coke of Norfolk", he sat as a Member of Parliament for many years but is best remembered for his interest in agricultural improvements and is seen as one of the instigators of the British Agricultural Revolution. In 1837 the titles held by his great-uncle were revived when Coke was raised to the Peerage of the United Kingdom as Viscount Coke and Earl of Leicester, of Holkham in the County of Norfolk. This was despite the fact that the 1784 creation of the earldom held by the Townshend family was then still extant (then "usurped" by John Dunn-Gardner), hence the territorial designation "of Holkham". Lord Leicester was succeeded by his eldest son from his second marriage, the second Earl. He served as Lord-Lieutenant of Norfolk for sixty years and was made a Knight of the Garter in 1873.

On his death in 1909 the titles passed to his eldest son, the third Earl. He was a colonel in the 2nd Battalion of the Scots Guards and also served as Lord-Lieutenant of Norfolk. He was succeeded by his eldest son, the fourth Earl in 1944. He was also Lord-Lieutenant of Norfolk. His younger son, David Arthur Coke was a friend of the author Roald Dahl but was killed in action during the second world war in December 1941. When he (fourth Earl) died the titles passed to his eldest son, the fifth Earl, in 1949. He was an Extra Equerry to both George VI and Elizabeth II. He died without male issue and was succeeded by his first cousin, the sixth Earl in 1976. He was the son of the Hon. Arthur George Coke, second son of the third Earl. Upon his death in 1994, his son became the 7th Earl of Leicester. As of 2015 the titles are held by his son Thomas Edward Coke, the eighth Earl, who succeeded in that year.

The family seat is Holkham Hall, near Wells-next-the-Sea, Norfolk. The traditional burial place of the Coke family is a plot situated on the south side of the churchyard of the Holkham parish church of St Withburga. A family mausoleum was built in the same churchyard in the 1870s, but was later abandoned. Many members of the Coke family during the post-medieval period were also buried in St. Mary's Church, Tittleshall.

== Earl of Leicester, first creation (1107) ==
Arms of Beaumont, earls of Leicester (1st creation): Gules, a Cinquefoil Ermine, which were adopted by the town of Leicester

- Robert de Beaumont, 1st Earl of Leicester (died 1118)
- Robert de Beaumont, 2nd Earl of Leicester (1104–1168)
- Robert de Beaumont, 3rd Earl of Leicester (died 1190)
- Robert de Beaumont, 4th Earl of Leicester (died 1204) (alias Robert FitzPernel)
- Amice, Countess of Leicester (died 1215)
- Simon de Montfort, 5th Earl of Leicester (c. 1170–1218, confirmed 1207)
- Simon de Montfort, 6th Earl of Leicester (1208–1265, forfeit 1265)

== Earl of Leicester, second creation (1267) ==
- Edmund Crouchback, 1st Earl of Leicester and Lancaster (1245–1296)
- Thomas, 2nd Earl of Leicester and Lancaster (c. 1280–1322, forfeit 1322)
- Henry, 3rd Earl of Leicester and Lancaster (c. 1281–1345) (restored as Earl of Leicester in 1324 and as Earl of Lancaster in 1327)
- Henry of Grosmont, Duke of Lancaster, 4th Earl of Leicester (c. 1310 – 1361)
- William V of Holland, Earl of Leicester (1330–1389) 1361–1362 Earl of Leicester jure uxoris.
- John of Gaunt, Duke of Lancaster, Earl of Leicester (1340–1399), in 1362 at first Earl of Leicester jure uxoris.
- Henry Bolingbroke, Duke of Lancaster, Earl of Leicester (1367–1413, became king in 1399)

== Earl of Leicester, third creation (1564) ==
- Robert Dudley, 1st Earl of Leicester (1532–1588)

== Earl of Leicester, fourth creation (1618) ==
Arms of Sidney, earls of Leicester (4th creation): Or, a Pheon Azure.

- Robert Sidney, 1st Earl of Leicester (1563–1626)
- Robert Sidney, 2nd Earl of Leicester (1595–1677)
- Philip Sidney, 3rd Earl of Leicester (1619–1698)
- Robert Sidney, 4th Earl of Leicester (1649–1702)
- Philip Sidney, 5th Earl of Leicester (1676–1705)
- John Sidney, 6th Earl of Leicester (1680–1737)
- Jocelyn Sidney, 7th Earl of Leicester (1682–1743)

== Earl of Leicester, fifth creation (1744) ==
- Thomas Coke, 1st Earl of Leicester (1697–1759)

== Earl of Leicester, sixth creation (1784) ==
- George Townshend, 2nd Marquess Townshend, 1st Earl of Leicester (1753–1811)
- George Townshend, 3rd Marquess Townshend, 2nd Earl of Leicester (1778–1855)

== Earl of Leicester, seventh creation (1837) ==
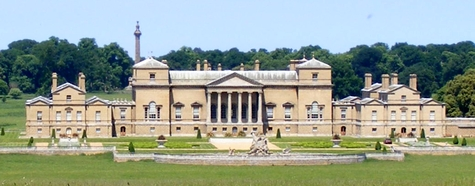
Holkham Hall

- Thomas William Coke, 1st Earl of Leicester (1754–1842)
- Thomas William Coke, 2nd Earl of Leicester (1822–1909)
- Thomas William Coke, 3rd Earl of Leicester (1848–1941)
- Thomas William Coke, 4th Earl of Leicester (1880–1949)
- Thomas William Edward Coke, 5th Earl of Leicester (1908–1976)
- Anthony Louis Lovel Coke, 6th Earl of Leicester (1909–1994)
- Edward Douglas Coke, 7th Earl of Leicester (1936–2015)
- Thomas Edward Coke, 8th Earl of Leicester (born 1965)

The heir apparent is the 8th Earl's son, Edward Horatio Coke, Viscount Coke (born 2003).

== Family trees ==
Peerage family tree of the Dukes of Beaufort, Lancaster, and Somerset and subsidiary titles

Earl of Dorset (possibly 1st creation), 1070
Roger de Beaumont c. 1015–1094	Saint Osmund d. 1099; Bishop of Salisbury and possibly Earl of Dorset
Earl of Dorset (1st creation) discontinued, 1099
Earl of Leicester (1st creation), 1107
King Henry I c. 1068–1135	King Stephen; 1092/1096–1154	Robert de Beaumont c. 1040/1050–1118; 1st Earl of Leicester	Henry de Beaumont d. 1119; Earl of Warwick
Earl of Worcester (1st creation), 1138
Robert FitzRoy c. 1090–1147; Earl of Gloucester	Matilda (d. bef. 1141)	Waleran de Beaumont; 1104–1166; Earl of Worcester	Robert de Beaumont; 1104–1168; 2nd Earl of Leicester	Hugh de Beaumont b. 1106; Earl of Bedford
Earldom of Worcester (1st creation) extinct, 1166
William FitzRobert; 1116–1183; Earl of Gloucester	Hawise de Beaumont	Robert de Beaumont d. 1190; 3rd Earl of Leicester
Robert de Beaumont d. 1204; 4th Earl of Leicester	Amice; Countess of Rochefort
King John; 1166–1216	Isabella; 1173/1174–1217; Countess of Gloucester	Simon de Montfort c. 1175–1218; 5th Earl of Leicester
King Henry III; 1207–1272	Eleanor of England	Simon de Montfort c. 1208–1265; 6th Earl of Leicester
Earldom of Leicester (1st creation) forfeited, 1265
Earl of Leicester (2nd creation), 1267; Earl of Lancaster, 1276
King Edward I 1239–1307	Edmund Crouchback; 1245–1296; 1st Earl of Leicester, 1st Earl of Lancaster
Earldom of Leicester (2nd creation) restored, 1324; Earldom of Lancaster restored, 1327
King Edward II; 1284–1327	Thomas of Lancaster; 1278–1322; 2nd Earl of Leicester, 2nd Earl of Lancaster	Henry of Lancaster; 1281–1345; 3rd Earl of Leicester, 3rd Earl of Lancaster
Earldom of Leicester (2nd creation) and Earldom of Lancaster forfeited, 1322
Duke of Lancaster, 1351
King Edward III; 1312–1377	Henry of Grosmont c. 1310–1361; Duke of Lancaster, 4th Earl of Lancaster, 4th Earl of Leicester	Joan of Lancaster c. 1312–1349 m. John (II) de Mowbray; 1310–1361; Baron Mowbray	Eleanor of Lancaster; 1318–1372	Mary of Lancaster c. 1320–1362
Earl of Worcester (2nd creation), 1397
John of Gaunt; 1340–1399; Duke of Lancaster, 5th Earl of Lancaster, (6th) Earl of Leicester jure uxoris Earl of Richmond	Blanche of Lancaster; 1342–1368; 5th Countess of Lancaster, (6th) Countess of Leicester	Maud of Lancaster; 1340–1362 a.k.a. Matilda, Countess of Hainault	William; 1330–1389; Duke of Bavaria and Count of Holland, (5th) Earl of Leicester jure uxoris	Richard Fitzalan; 1346–1397; Earl of Arundel	Thomas Percy; 1343–1403; Earl of Worcester
Earldom of Worcester (2nd creation) extinct, 1403
Eleanor Mowbray d. bef. 1387 m. Roger La Warr; 1326–1370
Earl of Somerset (1st creation), 1397; Marquess of Somerset and Marquess of Dorset (1st creation), 1397	Earl of Dorset (2nd creation), 1411
Henry Bolingbroke; 1367–1413; Duke of Lancaster, (7th) Earl of Leicester later King Henry IV	John Beaufort c. 1373–1410; Marquess of Somerset, Marquess of Dorset, 1st Earl of Somerset	Thomas Beaufort c. 1377–1426; Duke of Exeter, Earl of Dorset	Joan Beaufort c. 1379–1440	Joan La Warr m. Thomas West; 1365–1405; Baron West	Joan de Beauchamp; 1375–1435
Earldom of Leicester (2nd creation) and Dukedom of Lancaster merged into the Crown, 1399	Marquessate of Somerset and Marquessate of Dorset (1st creation) revoked, 1399	Earldom of Dorset (2nd creation) extinct, 1426
Duke of Lancaster, 1399	Earl of Worcester (3rd creation), 1421
Henry of Monmouth; 1386–1422; Duke of Lancaster later King Henry V	Richard Beauchamp; 1394–c. 1422; Earl of Worcester	Reginald West; 1395–1450; Baron De La Warr and Baron West
Dukedom of Lancaster merged into the Crown, 1413	Earldom of Worcester (3rd creation) extinct, 1422
Duke of Somerset (1st creation), 1443	Earl of Dorset (3rd creation), 1442; Marquess of Dorset (2nd creation), 1443; Duke of Somerset (2nd creation), 1448
Henry Beaufort; 1401–1418; 2nd Earl of Somerset	John Beaufort; 1404–1444; 1st Duke of Somerset, 3rd Earl of Somerset	Edmund Beaufort; 1406–1455; 2nd Duke of Somerset, 1st Marquess of Dorset, etc., 4th Earl of Somerset	Richard Neville; 1400–1460; Earl of Salisbury	Edward Neville d. 1476; Baron Bergavenny	Elizabeth Beauchamp; 1415–1448	Richard West; 1430–1476; Baron De La Warr, Baron West
Dukedom of Somerset (1st creation) extinct, 1444
Claimed titles here are disputed	Earl of Worcester (4th creation), 1449
Margaret Beaufort; 1443–1509	Elizabeth Woodville c. 1437–1492	Henry Beaufort; 1436–1464; 3rd Duke of Somerset, 2nd Marquess of Dorset, 5th Earl of Dorset	Edmund Beaufort c. 1438–1471; 4th Duke of Somerset, 3rd Marquess of Dorset, 6th Earl of Dorset	Cecily Neville c. 1425–1450	John Tiptoft; 1427–1470; 1st Earl of Worcester
Dukedom of Somerset (2nd creation), Marquessate of Dorset (2nd creation), and Earldom of Dorset attained, 1461, but possibly restored (disputed), 1463	Dukedom of Somerset (2nd creation), Marquessate of Dorset (2nd creation), and Earldom of Dorset extinct, 1471	Earldom of Worcester (4th creation) attainted, 1470
Thomas West c. 1457–1525; Baron De La Warr, Baron West
Marquess of Dorset (3rd creation), 1475	Earl of Worcester (5th creation), 1514	Earl of Worcester (4th creation) restored, 1471
Margery Wentworth c. 1478–1550	King Henry VII; 1457–1509	Elizabeth of York; 1466–1503	Thomas Grey; 1451–1501; 1st Marquess of Dorset	Charles Somerset c. 1460–1526; 1st Earl of Worcester	Elizabeth Somerset c. 1476–1507; 3rd Baroness Herbert suo jure	Edward Tiptoft c. 1469–1485; 2nd Earl of Worcester	Eleanor West b. 1481 m. Edward Guildford c. 1474–1534
Earldom of Worcester (4th creation) extinct, 1485
Viscount Beauchamp "of Hache" (1st creation), 1536; Earl of Hertford (2nd creation), 1537; Duke of Somerset (4th creation), 1547	Duke of Somerset (3rd creation), 1499
Edward Seymour c. 1500–1552; Duke of Somerset, Earl of Hertford, etc.	Jane Seymour c. 1508–1537	King Henry VIII; 1491–1547	Thomas Grey; 1477–1530; 2nd Marquess of Dorset	Henry Somerset c. 1495–1548; 2nd Earl of Worcester, 4th Baron Herbert	Mary Tudor; 1496–1533; Queen of France; Duchess of Suffolk	Edmund Tudor; 1499–1500; 1st Duke of Somerset	Jane Guildford c. 1508/1509–1555 m. John Dudley; 1504–1553; Duke of Northumberland
Dukedom of Somerset (4th creation), Earldom of Hertford (2nd creation), and Viscountcy Beauchamp (1st creation) forfeit, 1552	Dukedom of Somerset (3rd creation) extinct, 1500
Duke of Richmond and Somerset, 1525
King Edward VI; 1537–1553	Henry Fitzroy; 1519–1536; 1st Duke of Richmond and Somerset	Henry Grey; 1517–1554; Duke of Suffolk, 3rd Marquess of Dorset	Frances Brandon; 1517–1559; Duchess of Suffolk
Dukedom of Richmond and Somerset extinct, 1536	Marquessate of Dorset (3rd creation) attainted and honours forfeit, 1554
Earl of Hertford (3rd creation) and Viscount Beauchamp "of Hache" (2nd creation), 1559	Earl of Leicester (3rd creation), 1564	Baron Buckhurst (1st creation), 1567; Earl of Dorset (4th creation), 1604
Edward Seymour c. 1528–1593	Edward Seymour; 1539–1621; Earl of Hertford, etc.	Katherine Grey; 1540–1568	William Somerset c. 1526–1589; 3rd Earl of Worcester, 5th Baron Herbert	John Dudley c. 1527–1554; Earl of Warwick	Robert Dudley; 1532–1588; 1st Earl of Leicester	Mary Dudley c. 1530–1586 m. Henry Sidney	Guildford Dudley c. 1535–1554	Jane Grey; 1537–1554; Disputed Queen of England	Thomas Sackville; 1536–1608; 1st Earl of Dorset, etc.
Earldom of Hertford (3rd creation) forfeit, 1552	Earldom of Leicester (3rd creation) extinct, 1588
Seymour baronets, of Berry Pomeroy, 1611	Earl of Leicester (4th creation), 1618
Edward Seymour c. 1563–1613; 1st Baronet	Edward Seymour; 1561–1612; Viscount Beauchamp	Edward Somerset; 1553–1628; 4th Earl of Worcester, 6th Baron Herbert	Philip Sidney; 1554–1586	Mary Sidney; 1561–1621	Robert Sidney; 1563–1626; 1st Earl of Leicester	Robert Sackville; 1561–1609; 2nd Earl of Dorset, etc.
Marquess of Hertford (1st creation), 1641; Duke of Somerset (4th creation restored), 1660	Baron Seymour of Trowbridge, 1641	Marquess of Worcester, 1642	Viscount Somerset of Cashel, 1626	Viscount Rochester, 1611; Earl of Somerset (3rd creation), 1613
Edward Seymour c. 1580–1659; 2nd Baronet	William Seymour; 1588–1660; 2nd Duke of Somerset, 1st Marquess of Hertford, 2nd Earl of Hertford	Francis Seymour c. 1590–1664; 1st Lord Seymour of Trowbridge	Henry Somerset; 1577–1646; 1st Marquess of Worcester, 5th Earl of Worcester, 7th Baron Herbert	Thomas Somerset; 1579–1651; Viscount Somerset	Robert Sidney; 1595–1677; 2nd Earl of Leicester	Richard Sackville; 1589–1624; 3rd Earl of Dorset, etc.	Edward Sackville; 1591–1652; 4th Earl of Dorset, etc.	Robert Carr c. 1587–1645; Earl of Somerset, etc.
Viscountcy Somerset extinct, 1651	Earldom of Somerset (3rd creation) and Viscountcy Rochester extinct, 1645
Edward Seymour; 1610–1688; 3rd Baronet	Henry Seymour c. 1626–1654; Lord Beauchamp	Charles Seymour c. 1621–1665; 2nd Lord Seymour of Trowbridge	Edward Somerset; 1601–1667; 2nd Marquess of Worcester, 6th Earl of Worcester, 8th Baron Herbert	Philip Sidney; 1619–1698; 3rd Earl of Leicester	Algernon Sidney; 1623–1683	Lucy Sidney; 1630–1685	Henry Sidney; 1641–1704; Earl of Romney	Richard Sackville; 1522–1677; 5th Earl of Dorset, etc.
Duke of Beaufort, 1682	Baron Cranfield, 1674; Earl of Middlesex (2nd creation), 1675
Edward Seymour; 1633–1708; 4th Baronet	William Seymour; 1650–1671; 3rd Duke of Somerset, 2nd Marquess of Hertford, 3rd Earl of Hertford	John Seymour c. 1646–1675; 4th Duke of Somerset, 3rd Marquess of Hertford, 4th Earl of Hertford	Francis Seymour; 1658–1678; 5th Duke of Somerset, 3rd Lord Seymour of Trowbridge	Charles Seymour; 1662–1748; 6th Duke of Somerset	Henry Somerset; 1629–1700; 1st Duke of Beaufort, 3rd Marquess of Worcester, 7th Earl of Worcester, 9th Baron Herbert	Robert Sidney; 1649–1702; 4th Earl of Leicester	Thomas Pelham; 1653–1712	Charles Sackville; 1522–1677; 6th Earl of Dorset, etc., 1st Earl of Middlesex, etc.
Marquessate of Hertford (1st creation) extinct, 1675
Baron Conway of Ragley, 1703; Baron Conway of Killultagh, 1712	Duke of Dorset, 1720
Edward Seymour; 1663–1740; 5th Baronet	Francis Seymour-Conway; 1679–1732; 1st Baron Conway	Edward Coke d. 1707	Algernon Seymour; 1684–1750; 7th Duke of Somerset, Earl of Northumberland	Charles Somerset; 1660–1698 styled Marquess of Worcester	Philip Sidney; 1676–1705; 5th Earl of Leicester	John Sidney; 1680–1737; 6th Earl of Leicester	Jocelyn Sidney; 1682–1743; 7th Earl of Leicester	Elizabeth Pelham; 1681–1711	Lionel Sackville; 1688–1765; 1st Duke of Dorset, 7th Earl of Dorset, etc., 2nd Earl of Middlesex, etc.
Earldom of Leicester (4th creation) extinct, 1743
Baron Lovel, of Minster Lovel, 1728; Earl of Leicester (5th creation) and Viscount Coke, 1744
Edward Seymour; 1695–1757; 8th Duke of Somerset; 6th Baronet	Anne Coke	Thomas Coke; 1697–1759; Earl of Leicester, etc.	Henry Somerset; 1684–1714; 2nd Duke of Beaufort, 4th Marquess of Worcester, 8th Earl of Worcester, 10th Baron Herbert	Charles Townshend; 1700–1764; Viscount Townshend
Earl of Hertford (4th creation) and Viscount Beauchamp (2nd creation), 1850; Marquess of Hertford (2nd creation) and Earl of Yarmouth (3rd creation), 1793	Earldom of Leicester (5th creation) and subsidiary titles extinct, 1759	Viscount Sackville and Baron Bolebrooke, 1782
Edward Seymour; 1717–1792; 9th Duke of Somerset	Webb Seymour; 1718–1793; 10th Duke of Somerset	Francis Seymour; 1726–1799	Francis Seymour-Conway; 1718–1794; 1st Marquess of Hertford, etc., 2nd Baron Conway	Wenman (Roberts) Coke c. 1717–1776	Henry Somerset-Scudamore; 1707–1745; 3rd Duke of Beaufort, 5th Marquess of Worcester, 9th Earl of Worcester, 11th Baron Herbert	Charles Noel Somerset; 1709–1756; 4th Duke of Beaufort, 6th Marquess of Worcester, 10th Earl of Worcester, 12th Baron Herbert	George Townshend; 1724–1807; Marquess Townshend	Charles Sackville; 1711–1769; 2nd Duke of Dorset, 8th Earl of Dorset, etc., 3rd Earl of Middlesex, etc.	John Sackville; 1713–1765	George Germain; 1716–1785; 1st Viscount Sackville, etc.
Earl of Leicester (7th creation) and Viscount Coke (2nd creation), 1837	Baron Botetourt abeyance terminated, 1803	Earl of Leicester (6th creation), 1784
Francis Compton Seymour d. 1822	Francis Ingram-Seymour-Conway; 1743–1822; 2nd Marquess of Hertford, etc., 3rd Baron Conway	Hugh Seymour; 1759–1801	Thomas William Coke; 1754–1842; 1st Earl of Leicester, etc.	Henry Somerset; 1744–1803; 5th Duke of Beaufort, 7th Marquess of Worcester, 11th Earl of Worcester, 13th Baron Herbert, 5th Baron Botetourt	George Townshend; 1753–1811; 2nd Marquess Townshend, 1st Earl of Leicester	John Frederick Sackville; 1745–1799; 3rd Duke of Dorset, 9th Earl of Dorset, etc., 4th Earl of Middlesex, etc.
Baron Raglan, 1852
Edward Adolphus St Maur; 1775–1855; 11th Duke of Somerset	Francis Charles Seymour-Conway; 1777–1842; 3rd Marquess of Hertford, etc., 4th Baron Conway	George Seymour; 1787–1870	Henry Charles Somerset; 1766–1835; 6th Duke of Beaufort, 8th Marquess of Worcester, 12th Earl of Worcester, 14th Baron Herbert, 6th Baron Botetourt	FitzRoy James Henry Somerset; 1788–1855; 1st Baron Raglan	George Townshend; 1778–1855; 3rd Marquess Townshend, 2nd Earl of Leicester	George John Frederick Sackville; 1793–1815; 4th Duke of Dorset, 10th Earl of Dorset, etc., 5th Earl of Middlesex, etc.	John Frederick Sackville; 1767–1843; 5th Duke of Dorset, 11th Earl of Dorset, 6th Earl of Middlesex, etc., 2nd Viscount Sackville, etc.
Earldom of Leicester (6th creation) extinct, 1855	Dukedom of Dorset, Earldoms of Dorset (4th creation) and Middlesex (2nd creation), Viscountcy of Sackville, Baronies of Buckhurst (1st creation), Cranfield, and Bolebrooke extinct, 1843
Francis Edward Seymour; 1788–1866	Richard Seymour-Conway; 1800–1870; 4th Marquess of Hertford, etc., 5th Baron Conway	Francis George Hugh Seymour; 1812–1884; 5th Marquess of Hertford, etc., 6th Baron Conway	Henry Somerset; 1792–1853; 7th Duke of Beaufort, 9th Marquess of Worcester, 13th Earl of Worcester, 15th Baron Herbert, 7th Baron Botetourt
Earl St. Maur, 1863
Edward Adolphus St Maur; 1804–1885; 12th Duke of Somerset	Archibald Henry Algernon St Maur; 1810–1891; 13th Duke of Somerset	Algernon Percy Banks St Maur; 1813–1894; 14th Duke of Somerset	Francis Payne Seymour; 1815–1870	Thomas William Coke; 1822–1909; 2nd Earl of Leicester, etc.	Henry Charles FitzRoy Somerset; 1824–1899; 8th Duke of Beaufort, 10th Marquess of Worcester, 14th Earl of Worcester, 16th Baron Herbert, 8th Baron Botetourt	Richard Henry FitzRoy Somerset; 1817–1884; 2nd Baron Raglan
Earldom St. Maur extinct, 1885
Edward Adolphus Ferdinand St. Maur; 1835–1869	Algernon St Maur; 1846–1923; 15th Duke of Somerset	Edward Hamilton Seymour; 1860–1931; 16th Duke of Somerset	Hugh de Grey Seymour; 1843–1912; 6th Marquess of Hertford, etc., 7th Baron Conway	Thomas William Coke; 1848–1941; 3rd Earl of Leicester, etc.	Henry Adelbert Wellington FitzRoy Somerset; 1847–1924; 9th Duke of Beaufort, 11th Marquess of Worcester, 15th Earl of Worcester, 17th Baron Herbert, 9th Baron Botetourt	Henry Richard Charles Somerset; 1849–1932	George FitzRoy Henry Somerset; 1857–1921; 3rd Baron Raglan
Evelyn Francis Edward Seymour; 1882–1954; 17th Duke of Somerset	George Francis Alexander Seymour; 1871–1940; 7th Marquess of Hertford, etc., 8th Baron Conway	Henry Charles Seymour; 1878–1939	Thomas William Coke; 1880–1949; 4th Earl of Leicester, etc.	Arthur George Coke; 1882–1915	Henry Charles Somers Augustus Somerset; 1874–1945	FitzRoy Richard Somerset; 1885–1964; 4th Baron Raglan
Percy Hamilton Seymour; 1910–1984; 18th Duke of Somerset	Thomas William Edward Coke; 1908–1976; 5th Earl of Leicester, etc.	Anthony Louis Lovel Coke; 1909–1994; 6th Earl of Leicester, etc.	Henry Hugh Arthur FitzRoy Somerset; 1900–1984; 10th Duke of Beaufort, 12th Marquess of Worcester, 16th Earl of Worcester, 18th Baron Herbert, 10th Baron Botetourt	Henry Robert Somers FitzRoy de Vere Somerset; 1898–1965
Barony Botetourt abeyant, 1984
Hugh Edward Conway Seymour; 1930–1997; 8th Marquess of Hertford, etc., 9th Baron Conway	Edward Douglas Coke; 1936–2015; 7th Earl of Leicester, etc.	David Robert Somerset; 1928–2017; 11th Duke of Beaufort, 13th Marquess of Worcester, 17th Earl of Worcester	FitzRoy John Somerset; 1927–2010; 5th Baron Raglan	Geoffrey Somerset; 1932–2025; 6th Baron Raglan
John Michael Edward Seymour b. 1952; 19th Duke of Somerset	Henry (Harry) Jocelyn Seymour b. 1958; 9th Marquess of Hertford, etc., 10th Baron Conway	Thomas Edward Coke b. 1965; 8th Earl of Leicester, etc.	Henry John FitzRoy Somerset b. 1952; 12th Duke of Beaufort, 14th Marquess of Worcester, 18th Earl of Worcester	Arthur Geoffrey Somerset; 1960–2012
Sebastian Edward Seymour b. 1982 styled Lord Seymour	William Francis Seymour b. 1993 styled Earl of Yarmouth	Edward Horatio Coke b. 2003 styled Viscount Coke	Henry Robert FitzRoy Somerset b. 1989 styled Marquess of Worcester	Inigo Arthur Fitzroy Somerset; 7th Baron Raglan b. 2004	Ivo Geoffrey Arthur Tarsus Somerset b. 2007
Heir apparent to the Dukedom of Somerset	Heir apparent to the Marquessate of Hertford	Heir apparent to the Earldom of Leicester	Heir apparent to the Dukedom of Beaufort	Heir presumptive to the Raglan Barony

=== Family tree, 1744 and 1837 creations ===
Title succession chart, Coke baronets, Barons Lovel (third creation) and Earls of Leicester (fifth and seventh creations).

Edward Coke; 1552–1634
Henry Coke; 1591–1661	Clement Coke d. 1629
Coke baronet of Longford, 1641
Richard Coke; 1626–1669	Edward Coke d. 1669; 1st Baronet
Robert Coke; 1656–1678	Robert Coke; 1645–1688; 2nd Baronet	Edward Coke; 1648–1727; 3rd Baronet
Baronetcy extinct
Edward Coke; 1676–1707
Baron Lovel (3rd creation); Earl of Leicester (5th creation)
Thomas Coke; 1697–1759; 1st Earl of Leicester, etc.	Anne Coke	Maj. Philip Roberts d. 1779
Barony and earldom extinct
Edward Coke; 1719–1753 styled Viscount Coke	Wenman Coke (né Roberts) c. 1717–1776
Baron Lovel (4th creation), 1728; Earl of Leicester (7th creation), 1744
Thomas Coke; 1754–1842; 1st Earl of Leicester, etc.
Thomas Coke; 1822–1909; 2nd Earl of Leicester, etc.
Thomas Coke; 1848–1941; 3rd Earl of Leicester, etc.
Thomas Coke; 1880–1949; 4th Earl of Leicester, etc.	Arthur George Coke; 1882–1915
Thomas Coke; 1908–1976; 5th Earl of Leicester, etc.	Flight lieutenant David Arthur Coke; 1915–1941	Anthony Coke; 1909–1994; 6th Earl of Leicester, etc.
Edward Coke; 1936–2015; 7th Earl of Leicester, etc.
Thomas Coke; 8th Earl of Leicester, etc. b. 1965
Edward Coke b. 2003 styled Viscount Coke

== See also ==
- Mountsorrel, a village close to Leicester and home to the Earl of Leicester in 1151.
- Earl of Romney
- Marquess Townshend
- Baron de Clifford
- Coke baronets, a junior branch of the Coke family
