= Lord West =

Lord West may refer to:

- Baron West, a hereditary title in the Peerage of England created in 1402
- Alan West, Baron West of Spithead (born 1948), Royal Navy admiral and Labour politician
