= Thomas West, 2nd Baron West =

Arms of West: Argent, a fess dancettée sable. As borne today by Sackville (formerly Sackville-West), Earl De La Warr, Viscount Cantelupe, etc., heirs of Cantilupe

Thomas West, 2nd Baron West (1391 or 1392 – c. 30 September 1416) succeeded as Baron West at the age of 14. In less than a year, he married Ida de Saint Amand, younger daughter and coheiress of Amaury de Saint Amand, 3rd Baron Saint Amand (1341–1402). He was knighted on the eve of Henry V's coronation. He fought at the Battle of Agincourt, and is listed on a pipe-roll with a retinue of 14 lancers and 40 archers. Afterwards, he was assigned to the garrison of Calais. Next year, the Earl of Warwick, who was Captain of Calais, sent out an expedition on 24 September 1416 to capture a Genoese carrack, since the Genoese were allies of France. Thomas West was mortally wounded putting on his armoUr before the battle; he was arming himself at the foot of the mast when one of the stones being hauled up to the catapults on the masthead slipped; but he survived long enough to die in England. (His wife died that same fall; either a little before him, or on 15 December.) The Gesta Henrici Quinti puns in describing the manner of his death, suggesting that he received the chief of all evils (verticem mali) while pursuing the root of all evil (radicem mali).

Peerage of England
| Preceded by Thomas West | Baron West; 1405–1416 | Succeeded by Reginald West |
