= Thomas la Warr, 5th Baron De La Warr =

English nobleman

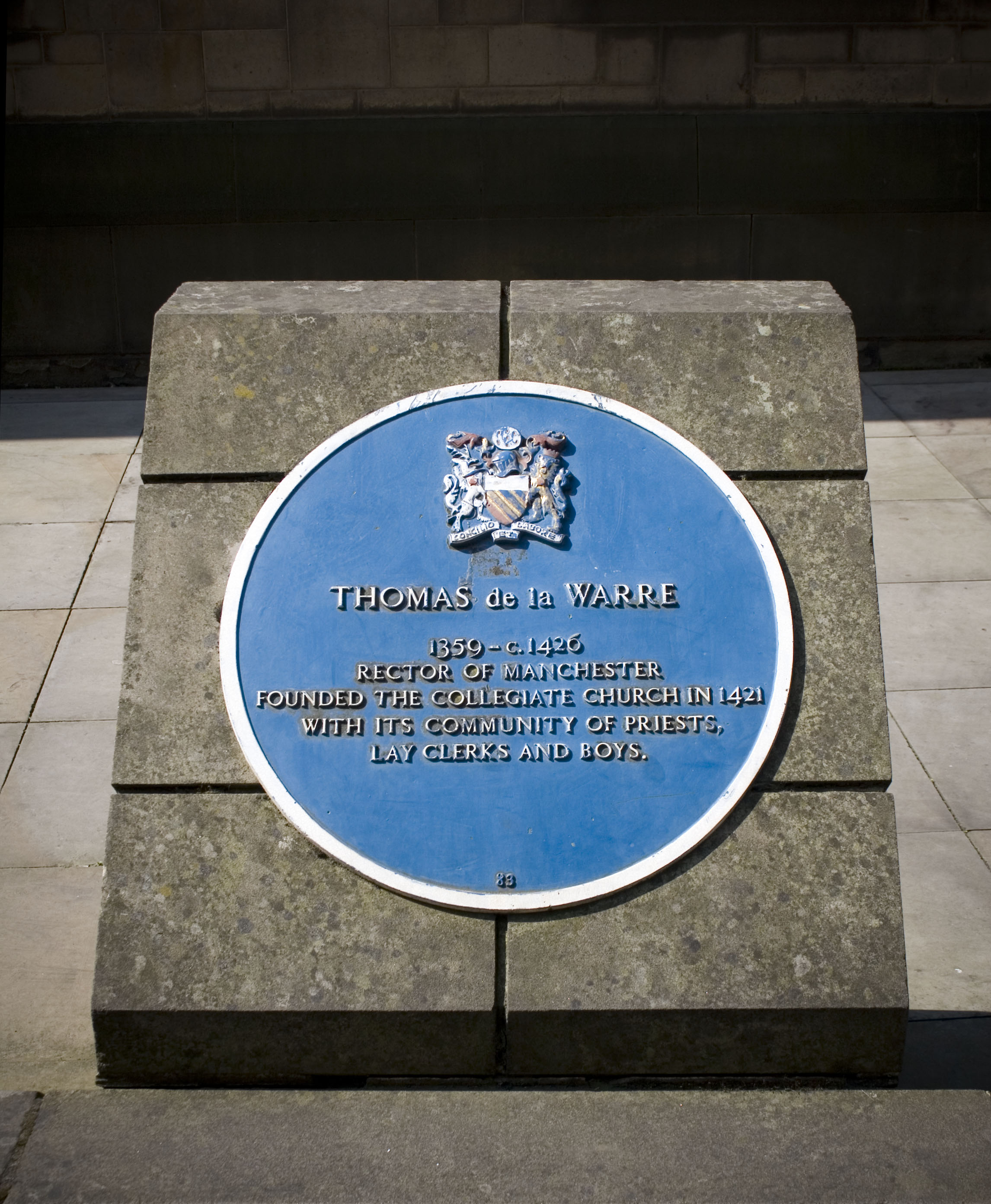
A Blue plaque for Thomas de la Warre outside Manchester Cathedral

Thomas la Warr, 5th Baron De La Warr (c. 1352 – 7 May 1427) was an English nobleman, the second son of Roger la Warr, 3rd Baron De La Warr and Elizabeth de Welle, daughter of Adam, 3rd Baron Welles.

Intended for the church, in 1363, De La Warr received a dispensation, permitting him to be ordained at the age of twenty, and was made a canon of Lincoln. He received his first parish on 13 October 1372; he was at various times, rector or prebend of Ashton-under-Lyne, New Lafford, Sleaford, Swineshead, Grindall (in the East Riding of Yorkshire), Manchester, Oxton and Cropwell, Riccall, and Ketton; frequently in plurality.

He was responsible for (in 1420) building St. Luke's church in Brislington. He enlarged Manchester Cathedral into a collegiate church in 1421. There is a statue of him on the exterior of the Manchester town hall.

He inherited the title and lands when his brother John died on 27 July 1398; but asked, three years later, to be excused from Parliament. (He was summoned, on pain of his life, in 1403.) He died, and was presumably buried, at his then parish of Swineshead, Lincolnshire.

== Notes ==
- Fleming, Peter. "Warr, de la, family". Oxford Dictionary of National Biography (online ed.). Oxford University Press. doi:10.1093/ref:odnb/65107. (Subscription, Wikipedia Library access or UK public library membership required.)

Peerage of England
| Preceded by John la Warr | Baron De La Warr; 1398–1427 | Succeeded by Reginald West |
