= Baron West =

Arms of West: Argent, a fess dancettée sable. As borne today by Sackville (formerly Sackville-West), Earl De La Warr, Viscount Cantelupe, etc., heirs of Cantilupe

Baron West is a title created in the Peerage of England in 1402. The title has been in abeyance since 1554, although it is possible to argue that it has been merged.

The 1st Baron West was Sir Thomas West, of Oakhanger, Northampton. He married the heiress Joan De la Warr, through whom his second son eventually became Baron De La Warr. The two titles descended together until the death of Thomas West, 6th Baron West and 9th Baron De la Warr.

At this point, the precise legal situation becomes debatable. As Cokayne points out, abeyance is merely a modern rule that approximates medieval practice. However, in applying the modern rule, both titles descend to heirs general, which left them in abeyance between the daughters of Sir Owen West, and this situation persists to the present day with their respective heirs.

In 1572 William West, the heir male and nephew of the co-heirs general, was created Baron De la Warr, but not Baron West, by letters patent. Depending on one's view of the law, this can be interpreted as either a settlement of the ancient Barony of De la Warr or a new creation that extinguished the old barony. Cokayne argues that there is no reason to assume that this changed the status of the title Baron West, but given the irregular practice used, it is just conceivable that a modern claimant to the Barony of West would be refused on the basis that the title was merged into the Barony of De la Warr, along with the estates.

Some genealogical sources claim that Sir Thomas West (1251–1344) of Hempston Cantilupe, in Devon, was summoned to Parliament and became Baron West in 1342, but this is not supported by Cokayne.

== Barons West (1402) ==
- Thomas West, 1st Baron West (1365–1405)
- Thomas West, 2nd Baron West (c. 1391–1416)
- Reginald West, 6th Baron De La Warr and 3rd Baron West (c. 1395–1450)
- Richard West, 7th Baron De La Warr and 4th Baron West (c. 1430–1476)
- Thomas West, 8th Baron De La Warr and 5th Baron West (c. 1457–1525)
- Thomas West, 9th Baron De La Warr and 6th Baron West (c. 1479–1554) (abeyant 1554)
