= Percy Seymour, 18th Duke of Somerset =

Duke of Somerset

His Grace The Duke of Somerset
- Portrait of Percy Seymour, 18th Duke of Somerset

Personal details
- Born: Percy Hamilton Seymour; 27 September 1910 Crowborough, Sussex, England
- Died: 15 November 1984 (aged 74) Warminster, Wiltshire, England
- Spouse: Jane Thomas (m. 1951)
- Children: John Seymour, 19th Duke of Somerset; Lady Anne Seymour; Lord Francis Seymour
- Parents: Evelyn Seymour, 17th Duke of Somerset (father); Edith Mary Parker (mother)
- Education: Blundell's School
- Alma mater: Clare College, Cambridge

Percy Hamilton Seymour, 18th Duke of Somerset (27 September 1910 – 15 November 1984), styled Lord Seymour between 1931–54, was a British peer.

== Early life ==
He was the son of Evelyn Seymour, 17th Duke of Somerset by his wife Edith Parker, a daughter of William Parker, of Whittington Hall, Derbyshire, by his wife Lucinda Steeves (a daughter of William Steeves, one of the Fathers of Canadian Confederation).

He was educated at Blundell's School, Tiverton in Devon, and at Clare College, Cambridge.

== Career ==
After Cambridge, he was commissioned into the Wiltshire Regiment. He saw service in India, Persia and Burma.

== Duke of Somerset ==
Percy succeeded his father as Duke of Somerset following the latter's death in 1954. His inheritance included the 8,500-acre Maiden Bradley Estate in Wiltshire and the 4,500-acre Berry Pomeroy Estate in Devon. Percy's father Evelyn Seymour, 17th Duke of Somerset had attempted to minimise estate taxes on the family lands by settling the bulk of his landholdings on Percy in a Trust in 1952; however, as the 17th Duke did not survive this settlement by five years the estates were still subject to death duties.

In September 1954 Percy sold the 2,530-acre Witham portion of the Maiden Bradley Estate to seven of his tenant farmers, who paid just under £100,000 for the land, which reportedly then yielded a gross annual income of £3,404.

== Personal life ==
In London on 18 December 1951, he married Gwendoline Collette Jane Thomas (d. 18 February 2005, aged 91), daughter of Major John Cyril Collette Thomas, of Burn Cottage, Bude, Cornwall, by whom he had three children:

- John Michael Edward Seymour, 19th Duke of Somerset (b. 1952), who married Judith-Rose Hull, daughter of London merchant banker John Folliott Hull, in 1978.
- Lady Anne Frances Mary Seymour (b. 1954), unmarried and without issue.
- Lord Francis Charles Edward Seymour (b. 1956), who married Paddy Poynder, daughter of Colonel Anthony John Irvine Tony Poynder, MC, Corps of Royal Engineers, in 1982.

== Death and Estate ==
The 18th Duke died on 15 November 1984 at Warminster, Wiltshire and was succeeded in his titles by his elder son, John. His personal estate was valued at £545,476 for probate, and a further grant of probate issued with respect to settled lands he held in Trust was valued at £4,896,571 in July 1985.

Peerage of England
Preceded by Evelyn Seymour	Duke of Somerset; 1954–1984	Succeeded by John Seymour
