= Jocelyn Sidney, 7th Earl of Leicester =

British peer

Jocelyn Sidney, 7th Earl of Leicester (1682 – 7 July 1743) was a British peer, known as Hon. Jocelyn Sidney until 1737.

He was the son of Robert Sidney, 4th Earl of Leicester and Lady Elizabeth Egerton. He was educated at University College, Oxford University. In February 1717, he married Miss Elizabeth Thomas, of Glamorgan.

On 30 April 1734, he was appointed Chief Porter of the Tower of London by his older brother John Sidney, 6th Earl of Leicester, then Constable of the Tower. He held the office until 1737, when he succeeded his brother as Earl of Leicester. He died on 7 July 1743, when the earldom and the viscountcy of Lisle became extinct. The dowager countess Elizabeth died on 14 November 1747.

While Leicester had no legitimate children, he left one illegitimate daughter, Anne Sidney, who married Henry Streatfeild of Chiddingstone, Kent on 25 September 1752. On Sir Jocelyn's death, Henry could potentially have inherited the Penshurst Estate, but after much legal wrangling Henry and Anne only received the income from the Sidneys' Welsh properties - but these were still fairly significant.

Peerage of England
Preceded by John Sidney	Earl of Leicester; 1737–1743	Extinct
