= Thomas West, 1st Baron West =

English nobleman

Arms of West: Argent, a fess dancettée sable. As borne today by Sackville (formerly Sackville-West), Earl De La Warr, Viscount Cantelupe, etc., heirs of Cantilupe

Thomas West, 1st Baron West (1365 – 19 April 1405) was an English nobleman and member of parliament.

== Biography ==
He was the only son of Sir Thomas West (1321–3 September 1386) of Hempston Cauntelow in Devon (named after its lords the Cantilupe family whose heiress Eleanor de Cantelowe married Sir Thomas West (1251–1344)), by his wife Alice FitzHerbert (died 1395), a sister and co-heiress of Sir Edmund FitzHerbert, both children of Sir Reynold Fitzherbert of Midsomer Norton, Somerset, members of the venerable Winchester family. Sir Thomas West (d.1386) had fought in the Battle of Crécy and the subsequent siege of Calais under the command of Richard FitzAlan, 10th Earl of Arundel. The younger Thomas almost certainly served alongside his father under King Richard II; one of them was in active service in Calais in 1386, the year of his father's death. A knight banneret, he served in Ireland with the Duke of Aumale in 1399, and attended Richard's young Queen Isabella of Valois homeward to Calais in 1401.

When West was seventeen, he and his mother and sister Eleanor were assaulted and robbed, by Sir Nicholas de Clifton, who carried his sister off; he was probably the same Nicholas de Clifton who later married her.

West was knighted in 1399, and summoned to Parliament as Baron West in 1402, by which time he held the manor of Harby, Nottinghamshire. He inherited the manor of Newton Tony, Wiltshire, from his father, and the manors of Midsomer Norton, Somerset, and Hinton Martell, Dorset, from his mother. He was later granted joint custody of Beaulieu Abbey. He died in 1405 and was interred alongside his mother at Christchurch Priory, Dorset.

== Marriage and issue ==
West married, before 2 May 1384, Joan La Warre, widow of Ralph de Wilington (d. 16 August 1382) of Sandhurst, Gloucestershire, and daughter of Roger la Warr, 3rd Baron De La Warr (d. 27 August 1370), and his second wife, Eleanor Mowbray, daughter of John de Mowbray, 3rd Baron Mowbray, by Joan of Lancaster, daughter of Henry, 3rd Earl of Lancaster. Joan la Warre was a half sister of John la Warr, 4th Baron De La Warr, and when he died without issue she became heiress to her younger half-brother, Thomas la Warr, 5th Baron De La Warr. They had three sons and a daughter:

- Thomas West, 2nd Baron West (d. 29 or 30 September 1416), who married, before 2 July 1406, Ida Saint Amand (6 May 1392 – before 6 November 1416), daughter and co-heiress of Amaury de St Amand, 3rd Baron St Amand, by whom he had no surviving issue.
- Reginald West, 3rd Baron West, 6th Baron De La Warr.
- John West (died c.1393),
- Joan West, who married firstly Richard Delabere, and secondly William Catesby.

== Notes ==
Peerage of England
New creation	Baron West; 1402–1405	Succeeded by Thomas West
