= Robert Sidney, 4th Earl of Leicester =

Robert Sidney, 4th Earl of Leicester (17 December 1649 – 11 November 1702) was the son of Philip Sidney, 3rd Earl of Leicester, and the former Lady Catherine Cecil.

== Life ==
As a child, Robert Sidney and his sister Dorothy had their portrait painted by Sir Peter Lely. He is commemorated in St John the Baptist, Penshurst.

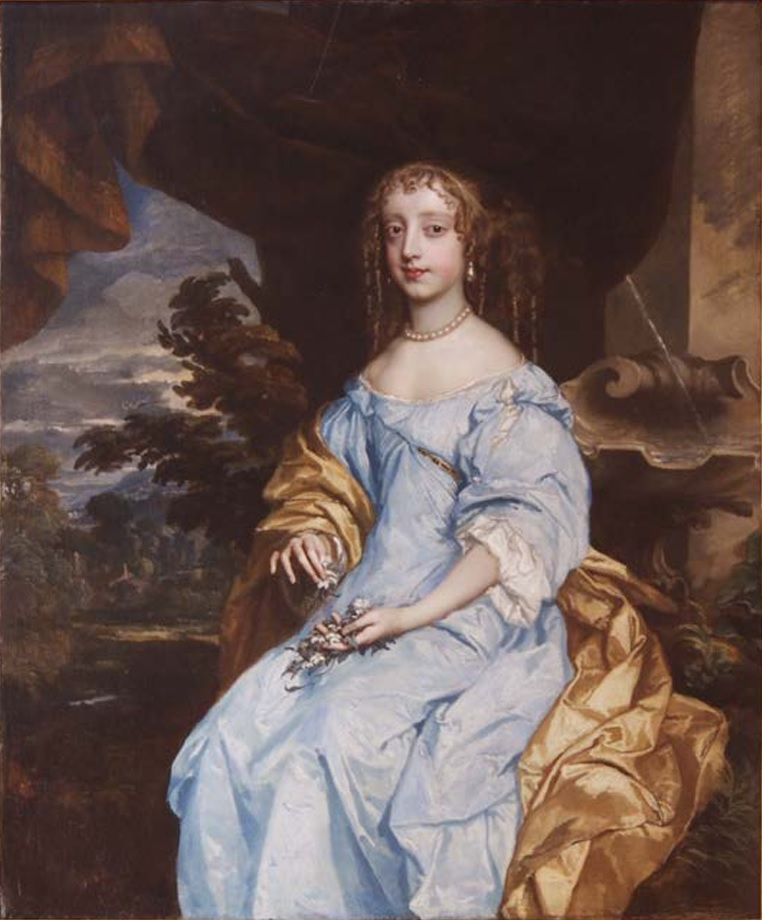
Elizabeth, Countess of Leicester, by Peter Lely

He succeeded his father to the earldom in 1698. He married Lady Elizabeth Egerton, daughter of John Egerton, 2nd Earl of Bridgewater, and they had four sons:

- Philip Sidney, 5th Earl of Leicester (1676–1705)
- John Sidney, 6th Earl of Leicester (1680–1737)
- Hon. Thomas Sidney (1681 – 27 January 1729)
- Jocelyn Sidney, 7th Earl of Leicester (1682–1743)

Three of his sons succeeded their father in turn to the earldom. The youngest son, Jocelyn, was the last earl of this creation.

Sidney's memorial can be seen at Penshurst. His tomb in Penshurst Church was designed by William Stanton of Holborn and completed by William woodman.

Peerage of England
Preceded by Philip Sidney	Earl of Leicester; 1698–1702	Succeeded by Philip Sidney
Preceded by Philip Sidney	Baron Sydney (writ in acceleration); 1689–1702	Succeeded by Philip Sidney
