= Reginald West, 6th Baron De La Warr =

English nobleman

- Arms of West: Argent, a fess dancettée sable. As borne today by Sackville (formerly Sackville-West), Earl De La Warr, Viscount Cantelupe, etc., heirs of Cantilupe
- Born: 5 or 7 September 1395
- Died: 27 August 1450
- Buried: Broadwater, Sussex
- Noble family: De La Warr
- Spouses: Margaret Thorley; Elizabeth Greyndour
- Issue: Richard West, 7th Baron De La Warr; Roger West; Anne West; Margaret West; Elizabeth West; Mary West; Katherine West
- Father: Thomas West, 1st Baron West
- Mother: Joan La Warre

Reginald West, 6th Baron De La Warr and 3rd Baron West (5 or 7 September 1395 – 27 August 1450) was an English nobleman and politician.

== Life ==
Reginald was the second son of Thomas West, 1st Baron West (d. 19 April 1405) and Joan La Warre (d. 24 April 1404).

Joan La Warre was the widow of Ralph de Wilington (d. 16 August 1382) of Sandhurst, Gloucestershire and daughter of Roger la Warr, 3rd Baron De La Warr (d. 27 August 1370) by his second wife, Eleanor Mowbray.

Eleanor Mowbray was the daughter of John de Mowbray, 3rd Baron Mowbray.

Reginald had an elder brother, Thomas West, 2nd Baron West. There was also a younger brother, John, and a sister Joan. His sister Joan married first, Richard Delabere, and second, William Catesby.

Reginald inherited the title of Baron West when his brother Thomas West, 2nd Baron West, was accidentally killed at sea on 29 or 30 September 1416, and the title Baron De La Warr in 1427 at the death of his uncle, Thomas la Warr, 5th Baron De La Warr (d. 7 May 1427).

Reginald was knighted at some time before 1416, and on 22 November of that year had livery of the lands inherited from his brother, Thomas West, 2nd Baron West.

During the wars in France, Reginald was captain of the castle of Saint Lo in the Cotentin in Normandy in March 1418 and in April 1421. Reginald was also captain of the fort of La Motte on 5 December 1419. On 21 June 1427 he had livery of the lands to which he was entitled as heir general of his uncle, Thomas la Warr, 5th Baron De La Warr.

Reginald was summoned to Parliament from 15 July 1427 to 3 August 1429 as Reginaldo la Warre chivaler, and from 25 February 1432 to 23 September 1439 as Reginaldo West chivaler. In October 1427 he petitioned the King and Council 'that he might sit in Parliament with the precedence held by his ancestors, Lords la Warre, who had continually attended Parliament since 27 Edward I'.

In 1430 and 1431 he was in France with the King. In 1435 he was appointed Justice of the Peace for Sussex. On 10 December 1446 he had licence to travel to Rome with a retinue of 24 servants, and on 13 December had a similar licence to travel to the Holy Land. On 14 October 1448, he was to have gone abroad 'on the King's affairs'.

West died on 27 August 1450, and was buried in St. Mary's Church, Broadwater, Sussex (now part of the town of Worthing).

== Marriages and issue ==
West married firstly, before 17 February 1429, Margaret Thorley, daughter of Robert Thorley, esquire, of Tybeste, Cornwall, and his first wife, Anne de la Pole, widow of Sir Gerard de Lisle, and daughter of Michael de la Pole, 1st Earl of Suffolk, by whom he had two sons and five daughters:

- Richard West, 7th Baron De La Warr, who married Katherine Hungerford.
- Roger West.
- Anne West (c.1426), who married Sir Maurice Berkeley (d. 5 May 1474) of Beverston Castle, Gloucestershire, by whom she had a son, Sir William Berkeley, who married Katherine Stourton, and a daughter, Katherine Berkeley, who married firstly John Stourton, 3rd Baron Stourton and secondly Sir John Brereton.
- Margaret West (c.1424), who married Sir Thomas Echingham (d. 20 January 1486) of Etchingham, Sussex, by whom she had three daughters.
- Elizabeth West, who married William de Berkeley, 1st Marquess of Berkeley (d. 14 February 1492), by whom she had no issue, and from whom she was divorced in 1467.
- Mary West (d. 24 July 1473), who married, as his second wife, Sir Roger Lewknor (d. 4 August 1478) of Broadhurst in Horsted Keynes, Sussex, by whom she had three sons.
- Katherine West, who married Roger Hungerford.
- John West of Waith, (c. 1432), who married Eleanor Neville, thus establishing another important connection for the family.

He married secondly, before 19 November 1443, Elizabeth Greyndour (d. 1 September 1452), daughter and heir of Robert Greyndour (d.1443), esquire, of Clearwell, Gloucestershire, by whom he had a daughter named Mary or Anne (b. 1450) who married Sir Roger Lewknor. After West's death, his widow married John Tiptoft, 1st Earl of Worcester, who was beheaded on Tower Hill 18 October 1470.

== Ancestry ==
Reginald West, 6th Baron de la Warr's ancestors in three generations
Reginald West, 6th Baron de la Warr	Father: Thomas West, 1st Baron West	Paternal Grandfather: Sir Thomas West	Paternal Great-grandfather: Sir Thomas West
Reginald West, 6th Baron de la Warr	Father: Thomas West, 1st Baron West	Paternal Grandfather: Sir Thomas West	Paternal Great-grandmother: Eleanor Cantelupe/Cantelou (first cousin of William de Cantelou and daughter of Margaret de Mohun, descendant of William de Mohun)
Reginald West, 6th Baron de la Warr	Father: Thomas West, 1st Baron West	Paternal Grandmother: Alice Fitzherbert	Paternal Great-grandfather: Either Edmund Fitzherbert or Reginald Fitzherbert
Reginald West, 6th Baron de la Warr	Father: Thomas West, 1st Baron West	Paternal Grandmother: Alice Fitzherbert	Paternal Great-grandmother: Unknown
Reginald West, 6th Baron de la Warr	Mother: Joan la Warr	Maternal Grandfather: Roger la Warr, 3rd Baron la Warr	Maternal Great-grandfather: John la Warr
Reginald West, 6th Baron de la Warr	Mother: Joan la Warr	Maternal Grandfather: Roger la Warr, 3rd Baron la Warr	Maternal Great-grandmother: Margaret Holland (daughter of Robert de Holand and half-sister of Thomas Holland, 1st Earl of Kent)
Reginald West, 6th Baron de la Warr	Mother: Joan la Warr	Maternal Grandmother: Eleanor Mowbray	Maternal Great-grandfather: John de Mowbray, 3rd Baron Mowbray
Reginald West, 6th Baron de la Warr	Mother: Joan la Warr	Maternal Grandmother: Eleanor Mowbray	Maternal Great-grandmother: Joan of Lancaster

Peerage of England
Preceded by Thomas West	Baron West; 1416–1450	Succeeded by Richard West
Preceded by Thomas la Warr	Baron De La Warr; 1427–1450	Succeeded by Richard West
