= Philip Sidney, 5th Earl of Leicester =

British peer and Member of Parliament

The Right Honourable Philip Sidney The Earl of Leicester
- Tenure: 1702–1705
- Predecessor: Robert Sidney, 4th Earl of Leicester
- Successor: John Sidney, 6th Earl of Leicester
- Born: 8 July 1676
- Died: 24 July 1705 (aged 29)
- Father: Robert Sidney, 4th Earl of Leicester

Philip Sidney, 5th Earl of Leicester (8 July 1676 – 24 July 1705) was an English peer and Member of Parliament for Kent, styled Viscount Lisle from 1698 to 1702.

He inherited the earldom from Robert Sidney, 4th Earl of Leicester and was succeeded by his brother John Sidney, 6th Earl of Leicester. There is a memorial to him at St John the Baptist, Penshurst.

Parliament of England
Preceded by Sir John Knatchbull; Sir Thomas Roberts	Member of Parliament for Kent; 1695–1698; With: Sir Thomas Roberts	Succeeded by Sir James Oxenden; Sir Stephen Lennard
Peerage of England
Preceded by Robert Sidney	Earl of Leicester; 1702–1705	Succeeded by John Sidney
