= Richard West, 7th Baron De La Warr =

- Born: 28 October 1430
- Died: 10 March 1476 (aged 45)
- Noble family: De La Warr
- Spouse: Katherine Hungerford
- Issue: Thomas West, 8th Baron De La Warr; John West; Reginald West; Edward West; Richard West; Francis West; Alice West; Katherine West; Margery West
- Father: Reginald West, 6th Baron De La Warr
- Mother: Margaret Thorley

Arms of West: Argent, a fess dancettée sable. As borne today by Sackville (formerly Sackville-West), Earl De La Warr, Viscount Cantelupe, etc., heirs of Cantilupe

Richard West, 7th Baron De La Warr and 4th Baron West (28 October 1430 – 10 March 1476) was the son of Reginald West, 6th Baron De La Warr, by his first wife, Margaret Thorley, daughter of Robert Thorley, esquire, of Tybesta, Cornwall, and his first wife, Anne de la Pole, widow of Sir Gerard de Lisle, and daughter of Michael de la Pole, 1st Earl of Suffolk.

He fought on the Lancastrian side in the Wars of the Roses, receiving an annuity of £40 for his services on 19 December 1459.

On 1 July 1463, he had licence to travel abroad for three years with a retinue of 12 servants. He obtained a general pardon on 15 October 1471.

== Marriage and issue ==
He married, before 10 June 1451, Katherine Hungerford (d. 12 May 1493), daughter of Robert Hungerford, 2nd Baron Hungerford, of Heytesbury, Wiltshire, and Margaret Botreaux, daughter of William de Botreaux, 3rd Baron Botreaux, of Boscastle, Cornwall, by whom he had six sons and three daughters:

- Thomas West, 8th Baron De La Warr.
- John West.
- Reginald West, a sub-deacon of Wells Cathedral.
- Edward West.
- Richard West, a Franciscan friar.
- Francis West.
- Alice West, a nun.
- Katherine West, who married Sir Nicholas Strelley.
- Margery West, a nun.

After West's death, his widow married, before 1 November 1476, as her second husband Geni -, Nicholas Leventhorpe (died c.1505), esquire, of Bramham, West Yorkshire, King's Yeoman and Receiver of Pontefract, son of Geoffrey Leventhorpe.

== Footnotes ==
Peerage of England
Preceded by Reginald West	Baron De La Warr; Baron West; 1450–1475	Succeeded by Thomas West
