= Roger la Warr, 3rd Baron De La Warr =

English nobleman

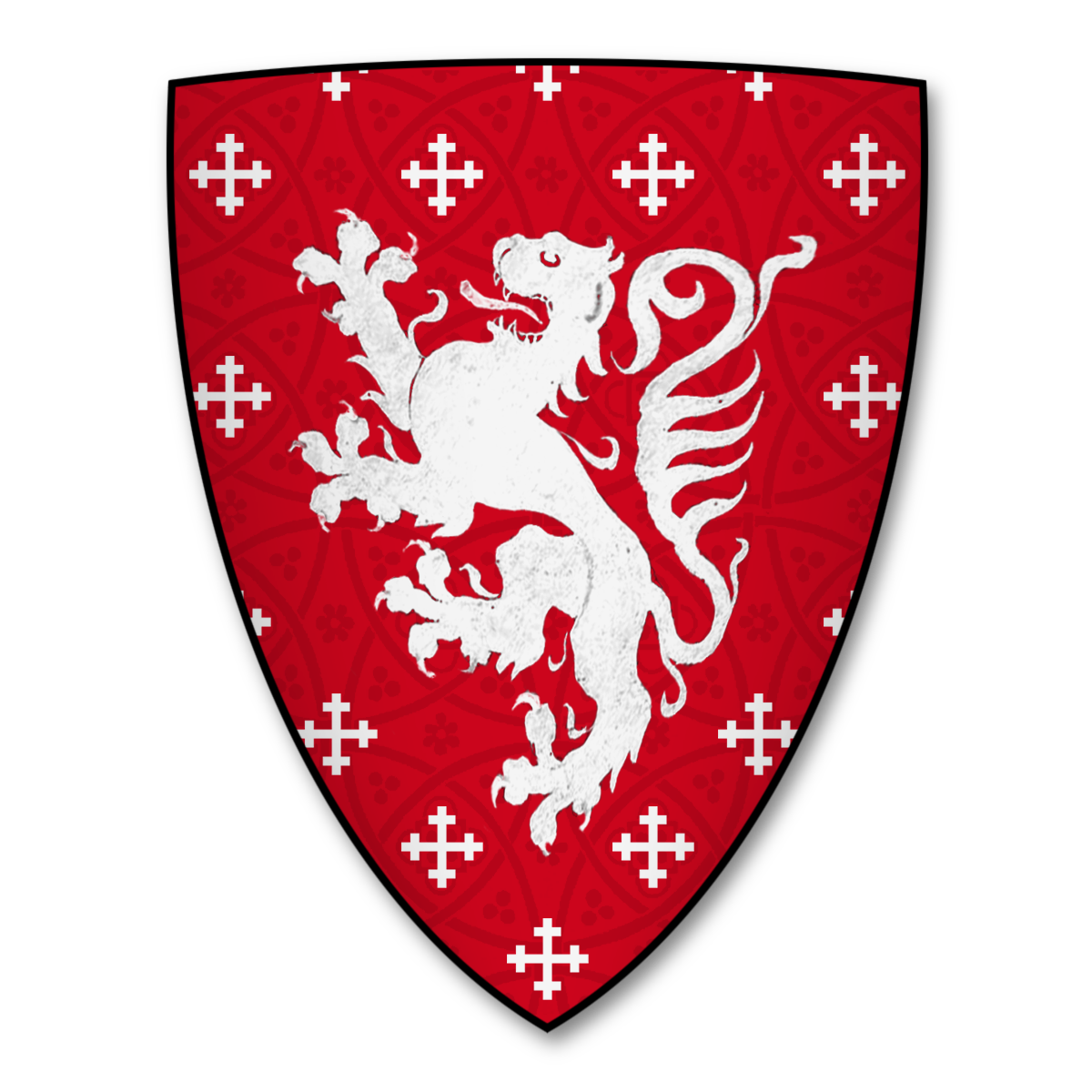
- Arms of Roger la Warr: Gules, crusily and a lion rampant argent.
- Born: 30 November 1326; Northampton
- Died: 27 August 1370 (aged 43); Ruelle-sur-Touvre
- Spouses: Elizabeth Welles; Eleanor Mowbray
- Father: John la Warr
- Mother: Margaret de Holland

Roger la Warr, 3rd Baron De La Warr (30 November 1326– 27 August 1370), was an English nobleman. He was born on 30 November 1326, son of John la Warre, Knt. (d. 24 June 1331), and Margaret de Holland (d. Aug. 1349). His maternal grandfather was Sir Robert de Holand, 1st Lord Holand. His paternal grandfather was John la Warre (d. 1331), son of John, Baron de la Warre (d. 9 May 1347), and Joan de Grelle, daughter of Sir Thomas Grelle.

== Biography ==
Roger was the eldest son of John la Warr, Master of Warr and Margaret de Holand. He fought in the Hundred Years' War in France, where he fought at the Battle of Poitiers in 1356 and took a share in the capture of King John II of France. Roger was also involved in the siege of Calais in 1346-1347 and the battle of Calais in 1349.

He died in 1370 while in Gascony and was succeeded by his eldest son John.

== Marriage and issue ==
He married firstly Elizabeth, daughter of Adam de Welles, 3rd Baron Welles and Margaret Bardolf. They had the following known issue:

- John la Warr, 4th Baron De La Warr, died without issue.
- Thomas la Warr, 5th Baron De La Warr, died without issue.

He married thirdly, before 23 July 1358, Eleanor de Mowbray (d. bef. 18 June 1387), daughter of John de Mowbray, 3rd Baron Mowbray and Joan of Lancaster. They had the following known issue:

- Joan la Warr (d. 24 April 1404), married secondly in May 1384, Thomas West, 1st Baron West (1365–1405), had issue; she had also married Lewis Clifford of Princes Risborough.

In his will of 1368, he mentions younger sons Edward and John and a daughter Katherine.

== Citations ==
Peerage of England
Preceded by John la Warr	Baron De La Warr; 1347–1370	Succeeded by John la Warr
