= Baron Botetourt =

Barony of Botetourt
- Creation date: 19 June 1305
- Created by: King Edward I
- Peerage: Peerage of England
- First holder: John Botetourt
- Present holder: abeyant between Frederica Thomas, Alexandra Peyronel and Lord Herbert
- Remainder to: the 1st Baron's heirs general of the body lawfully begotten

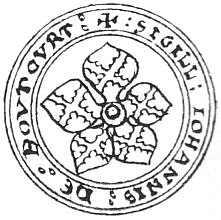
Seal of John, 1st Baron Botetourt, as appended to the Barons' Letter of 1301

Baron Botetourt (/ˈbɒtətɔːrt/ BOT-ə-tort) is an abeyant title in the Peerage of England. It was created by writ of summons on 19 June 1305. It became abeyant in 1406, but was recalled from abeyance in 1764 for Norborne Berkeley. However, it became abeyant again on his death in 1770. It was recalled a second time in 1803 for the 5th Duke of Beaufort, and became a subsidiary title of the dukes of Beaufort until the death of the 10th Duke in 1984, when it became, and remains, abeyant.

== In Virginia ==
Known and remembered in the American state of Virginia as "Lord Botetourt", Norborne Berkeley was governor of the Colony of Virginia from 1768 to 1770 and a member of the Board of Visitors of the College of William and Mary. Before coming to Virginia he was Member of Parliament for Gloucestershire 1741–1763. He then obtained his peerage when it was called out of abeyance in 1764, the third holder of the title having died in 1406.

As governor, Botetourt resided in the Governor's Palace near Duke of Gloucester Street, now a major attraction of Colonial Williamsburg in the Historic Triangle. Although a popular governor, Botetourt served only two years. He died suddenly while still in office in 1770 and was buried in the crypt beneath the chapel of the Wren Building. Following his death a statue was commissioned and placed on the piazza of the Capitol building. Later it was moved, and the statue stood for many years in front of the Wren Building before being relocated once again to a more sheltered location within the ground floor of Earl Gregg Swem Library. A full-size facsimile stands in its place, one of the more familiar of campus icons. Nowadays, William & Mary students dress up the statue for various occasions such as Charter Day (February 8).

Botetourt County was named in his honor, as was Berkeley County, which became part of West Virginia at the time of the American Civil War. A lifelong bachelor, he endowed an award at the College of William and Mary that is still known as the Botetourt Medal; it is the college's most prestigious award. The medal was awarded to two students a year from 1772 to 1775, one in Classics and one in the Physical or Metaphysical Sciences. The medal was not awarded again until 1941, and has been awarded to one student each year since then. It is awarded to the "single undergraduate with the greatest distinction in scholarship" on Commencement Day each May. Lord Botetourt High School, located in Botetourt County, is named after him as well. Additionally, Botetourt Street and Botetourt Gardens, both located in Norfolk, Virginia, are also named after him.

== Barons Botetourt (1305) ==
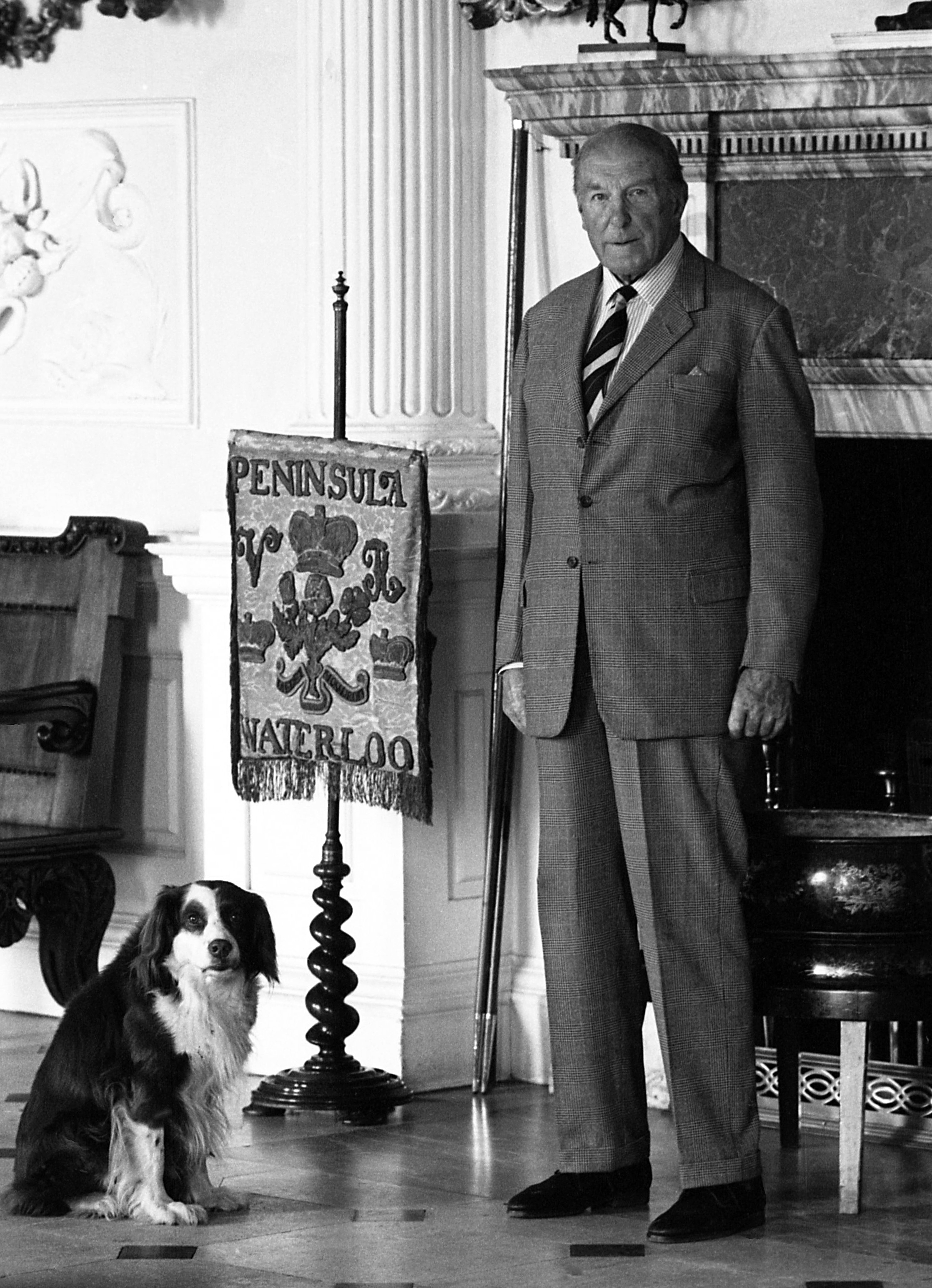
Henry Hugh Arthur Somerset, 10th Duke of Beaufort, 10th Baron Botetourt at Badminton House, by Allan Warren

- John Botetourt, 1st Baron Botetourt (d. 1324)
- John Botetourt, 2nd Baron Botetourt (d. 1385), grandson
- Joan Burnell, 3rd Baroness Botetourt (d. January 1, 1406)
- abeyant until 13 April 1764
- Norborne Berkeley, 4th Baron Botetourt (d. October 15, 1770)
- abeyant until 4 June 1803
- Henry Somerset, 5th Duke of Beaufort, 5th Baron Botetourt (1744 – October 11, 1803)
- Henry Charles Somerset, 6th Duke of Beaufort, 6th Baron Botetourt (1766–1835)
- Henry Somerset, 7th Duke of Beaufort, 7th Baron Botetourt (1792–1853)
- Henry Charles FitzRoy Somerset, 8th Duke of Beaufort, 8th Baron Botetourt (1824–1899)
- Henry Adelbert Wellington FitzRoy Somerset, 9th Duke of Beaufort, 9th Baron Botetourt (1847–1924)
- Henry Hugh Arthur Somerset, 10th Duke of Beaufort, 10th Baron Botetourt (1900–1984)
- abeyant

== Family tree ==
Peerage family tree of the Dukes of Beaufort, Lancaster, and Somerset and subsidiary titles

Earl of Dorset (possibly 1st creation), 1070
Roger de Beaumont c. 1015–1094	Saint Osmund d. 1099; Bishop of Salisbury and possibly Earl of Dorset
Earl of Dorset (1st creation) discontinued, 1099
Earl of Leicester (1st creation), 1107
King Henry I c. 1068–1135	King Stephen; 1092/1096–1154	Robert de Beaumont c. 1040/1050–1118; 1st Earl of Leicester	Henry de Beaumont d. 1119; Earl of Warwick
Earl of Worcester (1st creation), 1138
Robert FitzRoy c. 1090–1147; Earl of Gloucester	Matilda (d. bef. 1141)	Waleran de Beaumont; 1104–1166; Earl of Worcester	Robert de Beaumont; 1104–1168; 2nd Earl of Leicester	Hugh de Beaumont b. 1106; Earl of Bedford
Earldom of Worcester (1st creation) extinct, 1166
William FitzRobert; 1116–1183; Earl of Gloucester	Hawise de Beaumont	Robert de Beaumont d. 1190; 3rd Earl of Leicester
Robert de Beaumont d. 1204; 4th Earl of Leicester	Amice; Countess of Rochefort
King John; 1166–1216	Isabella; 1173/1174–1217; Countess of Gloucester	Simon de Montfort c. 1175–1218; 5th Earl of Leicester
King Henry III; 1207–1272	Eleanor of England	Simon de Montfort c. 1208–1265; 6th Earl of Leicester
Earldom of Leicester (1st creation) forfeited, 1265
Earl of Leicester (2nd creation), 1267; Earl of Lancaster, 1276
King Edward I 1239–1307	Edmund Crouchback; 1245–1296; 1st Earl of Leicester, 1st Earl of Lancaster
Earldom of Leicester (2nd creation) restored, 1324; Earldom of Lancaster restored, 1327
King Edward II; 1284–1327	Thomas of Lancaster; 1278–1322; 2nd Earl of Leicester, 2nd Earl of Lancaster	Henry of Lancaster; 1281–1345; 3rd Earl of Leicester, 3rd Earl of Lancaster
Earldom of Leicester (2nd creation) and Earldom of Lancaster forfeited, 1322
Duke of Lancaster, 1351
King Edward III; 1312–1377	Henry of Grosmont c. 1310–1361; Duke of Lancaster, 4th Earl of Lancaster, 4th Earl of Leicester	Joan of Lancaster c. 1312–1349 m. John (II) de Mowbray; 1310–1361; Baron Mowbray	Eleanor of Lancaster; 1318–1372	Mary of Lancaster c. 1320–1362
Earl of Worcester (2nd creation), 1397
John of Gaunt; 1340–1399; Duke of Lancaster, 5th Earl of Lancaster, (6th) Earl of Leicester jure uxoris Earl of Richmond	Blanche of Lancaster; 1342–1368; 5th Countess of Lancaster, (6th) Countess of Leicester	Maud of Lancaster; 1340–1362 a.k.a. Matilda, Countess of Hainault	William; 1330–1389; Duke of Bavaria and Count of Holland, (5th) Earl of Leicester jure uxoris	Richard Fitzalan; 1346–1397; Earl of Arundel	Thomas Percy; 1343–1403; Earl of Worcester
Earldom of Worcester (2nd creation) extinct, 1403
Eleanor Mowbray d. bef. 1387 m. Roger La Warr; 1326–1370
Earl of Somerset (1st creation), 1397; Marquess of Somerset and Marquess of Dorset (1st creation), 1397	Earl of Dorset (2nd creation), 1411
Henry Bolingbroke; 1367–1413; Duke of Lancaster, (7th) Earl of Leicester later King Henry IV	John Beaufort c. 1373–1410; Marquess of Somerset, Marquess of Dorset, 1st Earl of Somerset	Thomas Beaufort c. 1377–1426; Duke of Exeter, Earl of Dorset	Joan Beaufort c. 1379–1440	Joan La Warr m. Thomas West; 1365–1405; Baron West	Joan de Beauchamp; 1375–1435
Earldom of Leicester (2nd creation) and Dukedom of Lancaster merged into the Crown, 1399	Marquessate of Somerset and Marquessate of Dorset (1st creation) revoked, 1399	Earldom of Dorset (2nd creation) extinct, 1426
Duke of Lancaster, 1399	Earl of Worcester (3rd creation), 1421
Henry of Monmouth; 1386–1422; Duke of Lancaster later King Henry V	Richard Beauchamp; 1394–c. 1422; Earl of Worcester	Reginald West; 1395–1450; Baron De La Warr and Baron West
Dukedom of Lancaster merged into the Crown, 1413	Earldom of Worcester (3rd creation) extinct, 1422
Duke of Somerset (1st creation), 1443	Earl of Dorset (3rd creation), 1442; Marquess of Dorset (2nd creation), 1443; Duke of Somerset (2nd creation), 1448
Henry Beaufort; 1401–1418; 2nd Earl of Somerset	John Beaufort; 1404–1444; 1st Duke of Somerset, 3rd Earl of Somerset	Edmund Beaufort; 1406–1455; 2nd Duke of Somerset, 1st Marquess of Dorset, etc., 4th Earl of Somerset	Richard Neville; 1400–1460; Earl of Salisbury	Edward Neville d. 1476; Baron Bergavenny	Elizabeth Beauchamp; 1415–1448	Richard West; 1430–1476; Baron De La Warr, Baron West
Dukedom of Somerset (1st creation) extinct, 1444
Claimed titles here are disputed	Earl of Worcester (4th creation), 1449
Margaret Beaufort; 1443–1509	Elizabeth Woodville c. 1437–1492	Henry Beaufort; 1436–1464; 3rd Duke of Somerset, 2nd Marquess of Dorset, 5th Earl of Dorset	Edmund Beaufort c. 1438–1471; 4th Duke of Somerset, 3rd Marquess of Dorset, 6th Earl of Dorset	Cecily Neville c. 1425–1450	John Tiptoft; 1427–1470; 1st Earl of Worcester
Dukedom of Somerset (2nd creation), Marquessate of Dorset (2nd creation), and Earldom of Dorset attained, 1461, but possibly restored (disputed), 1463	Dukedom of Somerset (2nd creation), Marquessate of Dorset (2nd creation), and Earldom of Dorset extinct, 1471	Earldom of Worcester (4th creation) attainted, 1470
Thomas West c. 1457–1525; Baron De La Warr, Baron West
Marquess of Dorset (3rd creation), 1475	Earl of Worcester (5th creation), 1514	Earl of Worcester (4th creation) restored, 1471
Margery Wentworth c. 1478–1550	King Henry VII; 1457–1509	Elizabeth of York; 1466–1503	Thomas Grey; 1451–1501; 1st Marquess of Dorset	Charles Somerset c. 1460–1526; 1st Earl of Worcester	Elizabeth Somerset c. 1476–1507; 3rd Baroness Herbert suo jure	Edward Tiptoft c. 1469–1485; 2nd Earl of Worcester	Eleanor West b. 1481 m. Edward Guildford c. 1474–1534
Earldom of Worcester (4th creation) extinct, 1485
Viscount Beauchamp "of Hache" (1st creation), 1536; Earl of Hertford (2nd creation), 1537; Duke of Somerset (4th creation), 1547	Duke of Somerset (3rd creation), 1499
Edward Seymour c. 1500–1552; Duke of Somerset, Earl of Hertford, etc.	Jane Seymour c. 1508–1537	King Henry VIII; 1491–1547	Thomas Grey; 1477–1530; 2nd Marquess of Dorset	Henry Somerset c. 1495–1548; 2nd Earl of Worcester, 4th Baron Herbert	Mary Tudor; 1496–1533; Queen of France; Duchess of Suffolk	Edmund Tudor; 1499–1500; 1st Duke of Somerset	Jane Guildford c. 1508/1509–1555 m. John Dudley; 1504–1553; Duke of Northumberland
Dukedom of Somerset (4th creation), Earldom of Hertford (2nd creation), and Viscountcy Beauchamp (1st creation) forfeit, 1552	Dukedom of Somerset (3rd creation) extinct, 1500
Duke of Richmond and Somerset, 1525
King Edward VI; 1537–1553	Henry Fitzroy; 1519–1536; 1st Duke of Richmond and Somerset	Henry Grey; 1517–1554; Duke of Suffolk, 3rd Marquess of Dorset	Frances Brandon; 1517–1559; Duchess of Suffolk
Dukedom of Richmond and Somerset extinct, 1536	Marquessate of Dorset (3rd creation) attainted and honours forfeit, 1554
Earl of Hertford (3rd creation) and Viscount Beauchamp "of Hache" (2nd creation), 1559	Earl of Leicester (3rd creation), 1564	Baron Buckhurst (1st creation), 1567; Earl of Dorset (4th creation), 1604
Edward Seymour c. 1528–1593	Edward Seymour; 1539–1621; Earl of Hertford, etc.	Katherine Grey; 1540–1568	William Somerset c. 1526–1589; 3rd Earl of Worcester, 5th Baron Herbert	John Dudley c. 1527–1554; Earl of Warwick	Robert Dudley; 1532–1588; 1st Earl of Leicester	Mary Dudley c. 1530–1586 m. Henry Sidney	Guildford Dudley c. 1535–1554	Jane Grey; 1537–1554; Disputed Queen of England	Thomas Sackville; 1536–1608; 1st Earl of Dorset, etc.
Earldom of Hertford (3rd creation) forfeit, 1552	Earldom of Leicester (3rd creation) extinct, 1588
Seymour baronets, of Berry Pomeroy, 1611	Earl of Leicester (4th creation), 1618
Edward Seymour c. 1563–1613; 1st Baronet	Edward Seymour; 1561–1612; Viscount Beauchamp	Edward Somerset; 1553–1628; 4th Earl of Worcester, 6th Baron Herbert	Philip Sidney; 1554–1586	Mary Sidney; 1561–1621	Robert Sidney; 1563–1626; 1st Earl of Leicester	Robert Sackville; 1561–1609; 2nd Earl of Dorset, etc.
Marquess of Hertford (1st creation), 1641; Duke of Somerset (4th creation restored), 1660	Baron Seymour of Trowbridge, 1641	Marquess of Worcester, 1642	Viscount Somerset of Cashel, 1626	Viscount Rochester, 1611; Earl of Somerset (3rd creation), 1613
Edward Seymour c. 1580–1659; 2nd Baronet	William Seymour; 1588–1660; 2nd Duke of Somerset, 1st Marquess of Hertford, 2nd Earl of Hertford	Francis Seymour c. 1590–1664; 1st Lord Seymour of Trowbridge	Henry Somerset; 1577–1646; 1st Marquess of Worcester, 5th Earl of Worcester, 7th Baron Herbert	Thomas Somerset; 1579–1651; Viscount Somerset	Robert Sidney; 1595–1677; 2nd Earl of Leicester	Richard Sackville; 1589–1624; 3rd Earl of Dorset, etc.	Edward Sackville; 1591–1652; 4th Earl of Dorset, etc.	Robert Carr c. 1587–1645; Earl of Somerset, etc.
Viscountcy Somerset extinct, 1651	Earldom of Somerset (3rd creation) and Viscountcy Rochester extinct, 1645
Edward Seymour; 1610–1688; 3rd Baronet	Henry Seymour c. 1626–1654; Lord Beauchamp	Charles Seymour c. 1621–1665; 2nd Lord Seymour of Trowbridge	Edward Somerset; 1601–1667; 2nd Marquess of Worcester, 6th Earl of Worcester, 8th Baron Herbert	Philip Sidney; 1619–1698; 3rd Earl of Leicester	Algernon Sidney; 1623–1683	Lucy Sidney; 1630–1685	Henry Sidney; 1641–1704; Earl of Romney	Richard Sackville; 1522–1677; 5th Earl of Dorset, etc.
Duke of Beaufort, 1682	Baron Cranfield, 1674; Earl of Middlesex (2nd creation), 1675
Edward Seymour; 1633–1708; 4th Baronet	William Seymour; 1650–1671; 3rd Duke of Somerset, 2nd Marquess of Hertford, 3rd Earl of Hertford	John Seymour c. 1646–1675; 4th Duke of Somerset, 3rd Marquess of Hertford, 4th Earl of Hertford	Francis Seymour; 1658–1678; 5th Duke of Somerset, 3rd Lord Seymour of Trowbridge	Charles Seymour; 1662–1748; 6th Duke of Somerset	Henry Somerset; 1629–1700; 1st Duke of Beaufort, 3rd Marquess of Worcester, 7th Earl of Worcester, 9th Baron Herbert	Robert Sidney; 1649–1702; 4th Earl of Leicester	Thomas Pelham; 1653–1712	Charles Sackville; 1522–1677; 6th Earl of Dorset, etc., 1st Earl of Middlesex, etc.
Marquessate of Hertford (1st creation) extinct, 1675
Baron Conway of Ragley, 1703; Baron Conway of Killultagh, 1712	Duke of Dorset, 1720
Edward Seymour; 1663–1740; 5th Baronet	Francis Seymour-Conway; 1679–1732; 1st Baron Conway	Edward Coke d. 1707	Algernon Seymour; 1684–1750; 7th Duke of Somerset, Earl of Northumberland	Charles Somerset; 1660–1698 styled Marquess of Worcester	Philip Sidney; 1676–1705; 5th Earl of Leicester	John Sidney; 1680–1737; 6th Earl of Leicester	Jocelyn Sidney; 1682–1743; 7th Earl of Leicester	Elizabeth Pelham; 1681–1711	Lionel Sackville; 1688–1765; 1st Duke of Dorset, 7th Earl of Dorset, etc., 2nd Earl of Middlesex, etc.
Earldom of Leicester (4th creation) extinct, 1743
Baron Lovel, of Minster Lovel, 1728; Earl of Leicester (5th creation) and Viscount Coke, 1744
Edward Seymour; 1695–1757; 8th Duke of Somerset; 6th Baronet	Anne Coke	Thomas Coke; 1697–1759; Earl of Leicester, etc.	Henry Somerset; 1684–1714; 2nd Duke of Beaufort, 4th Marquess of Worcester, 8th Earl of Worcester, 10th Baron Herbert	Charles Townshend; 1700–1764; Viscount Townshend
Earl of Hertford (4th creation) and Viscount Beauchamp (2nd creation), 1850; Marquess of Hertford (2nd creation) and Earl of Yarmouth (3rd creation), 1793	Earldom of Leicester (5th creation) and subsidiary titles extinct, 1759	Viscount Sackville and Baron Bolebrooke, 1782
Edward Seymour; 1717–1792; 9th Duke of Somerset	Webb Seymour; 1718–1793; 10th Duke of Somerset	Francis Seymour; 1726–1799	Francis Seymour-Conway; 1718–1794; 1st Marquess of Hertford, etc., 2nd Baron Conway	Wenman (Roberts) Coke c. 1717–1776	Henry Somerset-Scudamore; 1707–1745; 3rd Duke of Beaufort, 5th Marquess of Worcester, 9th Earl of Worcester, 11th Baron Herbert	Charles Noel Somerset; 1709–1756; 4th Duke of Beaufort, 6th Marquess of Worcester, 10th Earl of Worcester, 12th Baron Herbert	George Townshend; 1724–1807; Marquess Townshend	Charles Sackville; 1711–1769; 2nd Duke of Dorset, 8th Earl of Dorset, etc., 3rd Earl of Middlesex, etc.	John Sackville; 1713–1765	George Germain; 1716–1785; 1st Viscount Sackville, etc.
Earl of Leicester (7th creation) and Viscount Coke (2nd creation), 1837	Baron Botetourt abeyance terminated, 1803	Earl of Leicester (6th creation), 1784
Francis Compton Seymour d. 1822	Francis Ingram-Seymour-Conway; 1743–1822; 2nd Marquess of Hertford, etc., 3rd Baron Conway	Hugh Seymour; 1759–1801	Thomas William Coke; 1754–1842; 1st Earl of Leicester, etc.	Henry Somerset; 1744–1803; 5th Duke of Beaufort, 7th Marquess of Worcester, 11th Earl of Worcester, 13th Baron Herbert, 5th Baron Botetourt	George Townshend; 1753–1811; 2nd Marquess Townshend, 1st Earl of Leicester	John Frederick Sackville; 1745–1799; 3rd Duke of Dorset, 9th Earl of Dorset, etc., 4th Earl of Middlesex, etc.
Baron Raglan, 1852
Edward Adolphus St Maur; 1775–1855; 11th Duke of Somerset	Francis Charles Seymour-Conway; 1777–1842; 3rd Marquess of Hertford, etc., 4th Baron Conway	George Seymour; 1787–1870	Henry Charles Somerset; 1766–1835; 6th Duke of Beaufort, 8th Marquess of Worcester, 12th Earl of Worcester, 14th Baron Herbert, 6th Baron Botetourt	FitzRoy James Henry Somerset; 1788–1855; 1st Baron Raglan	George Townshend; 1778–1855; 3rd Marquess Townshend, 2nd Earl of Leicester	George John Frederick Sackville; 1793–1815; 4th Duke of Dorset, 10th Earl of Dorset, etc., 5th Earl of Middlesex, etc.	John Frederick Sackville; 1767–1843; 5th Duke of Dorset, 11th Earl of Dorset, 6th Earl of Middlesex, etc., 2nd Viscount Sackville, etc.
Earldom of Leicester (6th creation) extinct, 1855	Dukedom of Dorset, Earldoms of Dorset (4th creation) and Middlesex (2nd creation), Viscountcy of Sackville, Baronies of Buckhurst (1st creation), Cranfield, and Bolebrooke extinct, 1843
Francis Edward Seymour; 1788–1866	Richard Seymour-Conway; 1800–1870; 4th Marquess of Hertford, etc., 5th Baron Conway	Francis George Hugh Seymour; 1812–1884; 5th Marquess of Hertford, etc., 6th Baron Conway	Henry Somerset; 1792–1853; 7th Duke of Beaufort, 9th Marquess of Worcester, 13th Earl of Worcester, 15th Baron Herbert, 7th Baron Botetourt
Earl St. Maur, 1863
Edward Adolphus St Maur; 1804–1885; 12th Duke of Somerset	Archibald Henry Algernon St Maur; 1810–1891; 13th Duke of Somerset	Algernon Percy Banks St Maur; 1813–1894; 14th Duke of Somerset	Francis Payne Seymour; 1815–1870	Thomas William Coke; 1822–1909; 2nd Earl of Leicester, etc.	Henry Charles FitzRoy Somerset; 1824–1899; 8th Duke of Beaufort, 10th Marquess of Worcester, 14th Earl of Worcester, 16th Baron Herbert, 8th Baron Botetourt	Richard Henry FitzRoy Somerset; 1817–1884; 2nd Baron Raglan
Earldom St. Maur extinct, 1885
Edward Adolphus Ferdinand St. Maur; 1835–1869	Algernon St Maur; 1846–1923; 15th Duke of Somerset	Edward Hamilton Seymour; 1860–1931; 16th Duke of Somerset	Hugh de Grey Seymour; 1843–1912; 6th Marquess of Hertford, etc., 7th Baron Conway	Thomas William Coke; 1848–1941; 3rd Earl of Leicester, etc.	Henry Adelbert Wellington FitzRoy Somerset; 1847–1924; 9th Duke of Beaufort, 11th Marquess of Worcester, 15th Earl of Worcester, 17th Baron Herbert, 9th Baron Botetourt	Henry Richard Charles Somerset; 1849–1932	George FitzRoy Henry Somerset; 1857–1921; 3rd Baron Raglan
Evelyn Francis Edward Seymour; 1882–1954; 17th Duke of Somerset	George Francis Alexander Seymour; 1871–1940; 7th Marquess of Hertford, etc., 8th Baron Conway	Henry Charles Seymour; 1878–1939	Thomas William Coke; 1880–1949; 4th Earl of Leicester, etc.	Arthur George Coke; 1882–1915	Henry Charles Somers Augustus Somerset; 1874–1945	FitzRoy Richard Somerset; 1885–1964; 4th Baron Raglan
Percy Hamilton Seymour; 1910–1984; 18th Duke of Somerset	Thomas William Edward Coke; 1908–1976; 5th Earl of Leicester, etc.	Anthony Louis Lovel Coke; 1909–1994; 6th Earl of Leicester, etc.	Henry Hugh Arthur FitzRoy Somerset; 1900–1984; 10th Duke of Beaufort, 12th Marquess of Worcester, 16th Earl of Worcester, 18th Baron Herbert, 10th Baron Botetourt	Henry Robert Somers FitzRoy de Vere Somerset; 1898–1965
Barony Botetourt abeyant, 1984
Hugh Edward Conway Seymour; 1930–1997; 8th Marquess of Hertford, etc., 9th Baron Conway	Edward Douglas Coke; 1936–2015; 7th Earl of Leicester, etc.	David Robert Somerset; 1928–2017; 11th Duke of Beaufort, 13th Marquess of Worcester, 17th Earl of Worcester	FitzRoy John Somerset; 1927–2010; 5th Baron Raglan	Geoffrey Somerset; 1932–2025; 6th Baron Raglan
John Michael Edward Seymour b. 1952; 19th Duke of Somerset	Henry (Harry) Jocelyn Seymour b. 1958; 9th Marquess of Hertford, etc., 10th Baron Conway	Thomas Edward Coke b. 1965; 8th Earl of Leicester, etc.	Henry John FitzRoy Somerset b. 1952; 12th Duke of Beaufort, 14th Marquess of Worcester, 18th Earl of Worcester	Arthur Geoffrey Somerset; 1960–2012
Sebastian Edward Seymour b. 1982 styled Lord Seymour	William Francis Seymour b. 1993 styled Earl of Yarmouth	Edward Horatio Coke b. 2003 styled Viscount Coke	Henry Robert FitzRoy Somerset b. 1989 styled Marquess of Worcester	Inigo Arthur Fitzroy Somerset; 7th Baron Raglan b. 2004	Ivo Geoffrey Arthur Tarsus Somerset b. 2007
Heir apparent to the Dukedom of Somerset	Heir apparent to the Marquessate of Hertford	Heir apparent to the Earldom of Leicester	Heir apparent to the Dukedom of Beaufort	Heir presumptive to the Raglan Barony
