= Amalie von Wallmoden, Countess of Yarmouth =

Mistress of George II (1704–1765)

The Right Honourable The Countess of Yarmouth
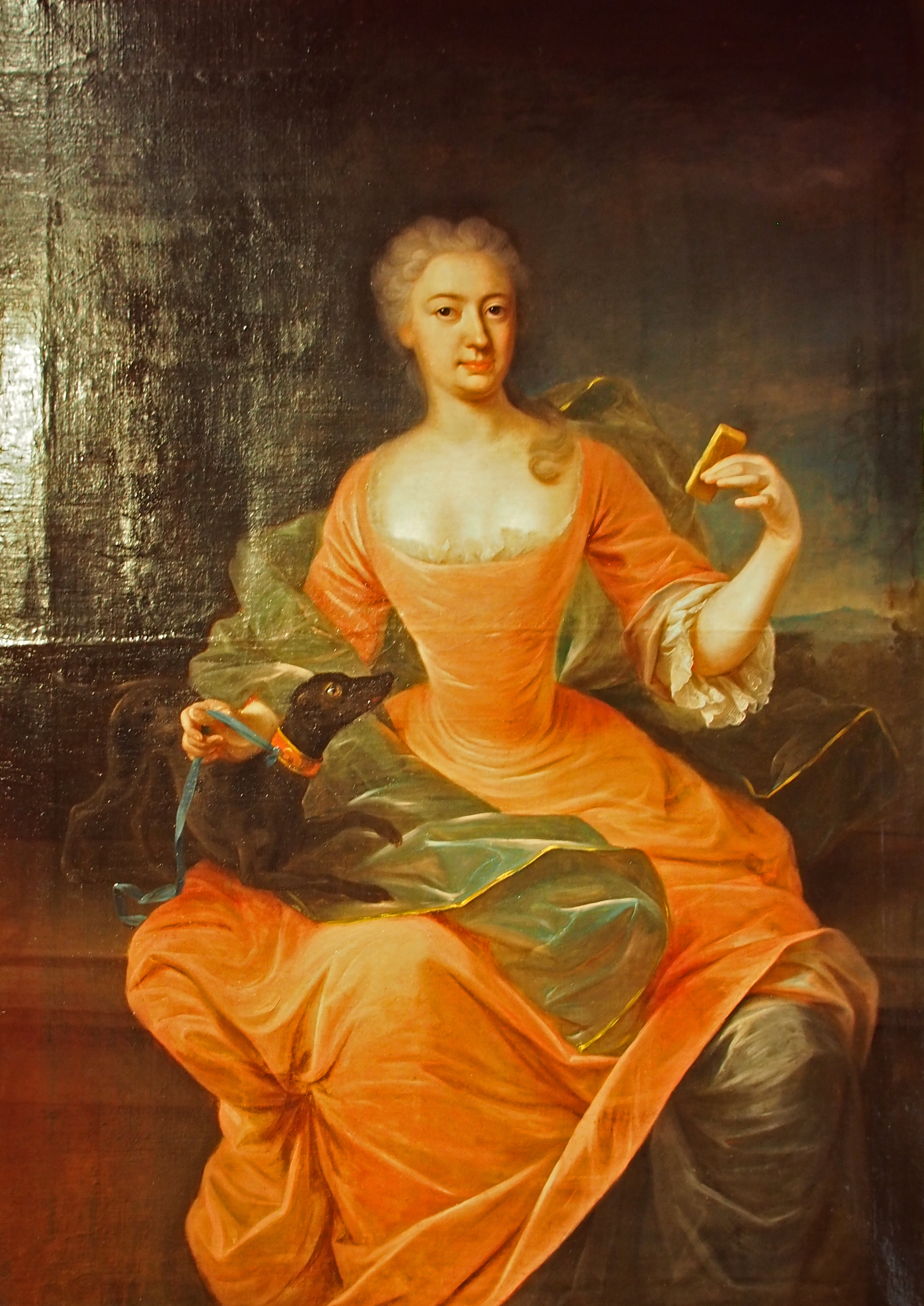
- Portrait of Amalie Sophie Marianne von Wallmoden, ca. 1745
- Born: 1 April 1704; Hanover
- Died: 19 or 20 October 1765 (aged 61); Hanover
- Citizenship: Hanoverian, British
- Known for: Royal mistress
- Spouse: Gottlieb Adam von Wallmoden (m. 1727–1739)
- Children: Franz Ernst von Wallmoden; Johann Ludwig, Reichsgraf von Wallmoden-Gimborn

Amalie Sophie Marianne von Wallmoden-Gimborn, Countess of Yarmouth, born Amalie von Wendt (1 April 1704 – 19 or 20 October 1765) was the principal mistress of King George II from the mid-1730s until his death in 1760.

Born into a prominent family in the Electorate of Hanover, and married into another, in 1740 she became a naturalised subject of Great Britain and was granted a peerage for life, with the title of "Countess of Yarmouth", becoming the last royal mistress to be so honoured. She remained in England until the death in 1760 of King George II, who is believed to have fathered her second son, Johann Ludwig, Reichsgraf von Wallmoden-Gimborn. She returned to Hanover for the rest of her life, surviving the king for nearly five years.

== Biography ==
She was born Amalie Sophie Marianne von Wendt on 1 April 1704, the daughter of Hanoverian General Johann Franz Dietrich von Wendt (1675-1748) and his wife, Friderike Charlotte von dem Bussche-Ippenburg (1684-1762). Her aunt was Melusine von der Schulenburg, Duchess of Kendal.

She entered into the House of Wallmoden in 1727 with her marriage to Count Gottlieb Adam von Wallmoden-Gimborn (1704-1752), son of Count Ludwig Achaz von Wallmoden-Gimborn (d. 1730) and his wife, Anna Elisabeth von Heimburg (1697-1738). Together, they had one son, Count Franz Ernst von Wallmoden (1728-1776).

In a letter dated 22 June 1738 to Charles, Viscount Townshend, she was described by A. Windham: "Madam Valmoden has fine black eyes and brown hair, and very well shaped, not tall, nor low; has no fine features, but very agreeable in the main."

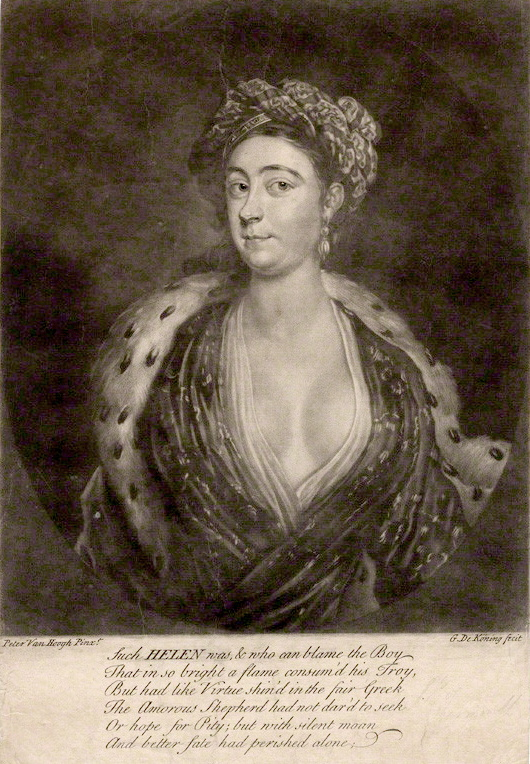
Mezzotint by G. de Koning of Amalie Sophie von Wallmoden

=== Royal mistress ===
George II was first attracted to the Countess Wallmoden in 1735 when he made one of his several visits to his Duchy of Hanover, where she lived with her husband. On 22 April 1736, she bore a son, called Johann Ludwig Graf von Wallmoden-Gimborn, said to be the unacknowledged illegitimate child of the king. George II's visits to his mistress in Hanover occasioned a reference by Samuel Johnson in his satiric poem London, published in May 1738.

The king ended the necessity of those visits after the death of his wife Caroline of Ansbach in November 1737, sending for the Countess Wallmoden to join him in England, but it did not put an end to Johnson's disapproval. In 1739, Johnson wrote scathingly of the king's relationship with Wallmoden, "his tortured sons shall die before his face / While he lies melting in a lewd embrace".

In 1739, Amalie von Wallmoden divorced her husband. In 1740 she was naturalised in Great Britain and granted the non-heritable title of Countess of Yarmouth, the last royal mistress to be so honoured. She was officially designated Amalie Sophie von Wallmoden to obscure the question of her marital status.

Robert Walpole indicated that her primary focus was on pleasing the king, although she was also said to be interested in the bestowing of peerages, reputedly playing a part in the creation of a Barony for Stephen Fox-Strangways in 1741 and in the newly created title of Viscount Folkestone for Jacob des Bouverie in 1747.

=== Later life and death ===
After the death of the king on 25 October 1760, Amalie von Wallmoden returned to Hanover. She died on 19 or 20 October 1765 from breast cancer, aged 61.

== Notes ==
Attribution

Rigg, James McMullen (1899). "Wallmoden, Amalie Sophie Marianne" . In Lee, Sidney (ed.). Dictionary of National Biography. Vol. 59. London: Smith, Elder & Co. pp. 149–150.
