= Gerard baronets of Harrow on the Hill (1620) =

Escutcheon of the Gerard baronets of Bryn

The Gerard baronetcy of Harrow on the Hill was created in the Baronetage of England on 12 April 1620 for Gilbert Gerard of Flambards, Harrow on the Hill, Middlesex, who was Member of Parliament for Wigan 1614, Middlesex 1621–48 and Lancaster 1660.

His son the 2nd Baronet represented Seaford from 1641 to 1648, Middlesex 1659 and Bossiney in 1660. His son, the 3rd Baronet, was the member for Middlesex from 1685 to 1687, and 1689 to 1695, and Cockermouth from 1695 to 1698. His two brothers followed as 4th and 5th Baronets; the baronetcy was extinct on the death of the latter in 1716.

== Gerard of Harrow on the Hill, Middlesex (1620) ==
- Sir Gilbert Gerard, 1st Baronet of Harrow on the Hill (1587–1670)
- Sir Francis Gerard, 2nd Baronet (1617–1680)
- Sir Charles Gerard, 3rd Baronet (1653–1701)
- Sir Francis Gerard, 4th Baronet (died 1704)
- Sir Cheeke Gerard, 5th Baronet (1662–1716)

== Extended family ==
The Flambards estate passed to Elizabeth Gerard, daughter of the 3rd Baronet. She married, firstly in 1709, Warwick Lake, MP for Middlesex, who died in 1712. She married, secondly, Miles Stapleton, third son of Sir William Stapleton, 1st Baronet. Flambards was sold in 1767 to Francis Herne.
