= Charles Seymour, 2nd Baron Seymour of Trowbridge =

English peer

Member of Parliament for Wiltshire
- In office 1661-1664

Member of Parliament for Great Bedwyn
- In office 1640

Personal details
- Born: c. 1621
- Died: 25 August 1665 (aged 43–44)
- Spouse(s): Mary Smith (m. 1632) Elizabeth Alington (m. 1654)
- Children: 10, including Francis and Charles
- Parent: Francis Seymour (father)
- Relatives: William Seymour (uncle); Edward Seymour (grandfather)

Charles Seymour, 2nd Baron Seymour of Trowbridge (c. 1621 – 25 August 1665) was an English peer.

== Biography ==
He was the son of Francis Seymour, 1st Baron Seymour of Trowbridge, whom he succeeded in the barony in 1664. Francis had been a younger brother of William Seymour, 2nd Duke of Somerset.

Prior to his ennoblement, Charles Seymour represented Great Bedwyn in the Short Parliament of 1640 and Wiltshire in the Cavalier Parliament from 1661 to 1664. Following the outbreak of the civil war, he joined his father in Oxford,but did not fight for the king.

He married firstly, on 4 April 1632, Mary, daughter of Thomas Smith of Soley in Chilton Foliat, a village northwest of Hungerford. The couple had one son and two daughters; one of their daughters, Frances (bef. 1654–1716), would marry Sir George Hungerford. The Hungerfords had at least six children together. He married secondly, in 1654, Elizabeth Alington (1635–c.1691), daughter of William Alington, 1st Baron Alington of Killard (14 March 1610/1611, d. circa October 1648); they had five sons and two daughters. One of his notable descendants, his three times great-grandson, was the chemist and mineralogist James Smithson. The poet George Keate was another descendant.

Both of Charles's surviving sons, Francis and Charles, ultimately succeeded to the dukedom of Somerset that had been their grandfather's. His daughter, Honora Seymour, married Sir Charles Gerard, 3rd Baronet. Charles Seymour was succeeded in the barony by his elder son, Francis. His widow Elizabeth later married John Ernle.

== Sources ==
- G.E.C. (G.E.Cokayne) & Geoffrey H. White, The Complete Peerage or A history of the House of Lords and all its members from the earliest times, vol. XI, p. 641, St. Catherine Press, 1949.

Honorary titles
Preceded by The Lord Seymour of Trowbridge	Custos Rotulorum of Wiltshire; 1664–1665	Succeeded by Lord Herbert
Peerage of England
Preceded by Francis Seymour	Baron Seymour of Trowbridge; 1664–1665	Succeeded by Francis Seymour
