= Francis Seymour, 5th Duke of Somerset =

British aristocrat (1658–1678)

His Grace The Duke of Somerset
- Tenure: 1675–1678
- Predecessor: John Seymour
- Successor: Charles Seymour
- Other titles: Baron Seymour of Trowbridge
- Born: Francis Seymour; 17 January 1658
- Died: 20 April 1678 (aged 20)
- Father: Charles Seymour
- Mother: Elizabeth Alington

Francis Seymour, 5th Duke of Somerset (17 January 1658 – 20 April 1678), known as 3rd Baron Seymour of Trowbridge between 1665 and 1675, was an English peer.

He was the son of Charles Seymour, 2nd Baron Seymour of Trowbridge, and Elizabeth Alington (1635–1692). The dukedom came to him because his grandfather, Sir Francis Seymour, was a younger brother of the 2nd Duke of Somerset. He died aged 20, unmarried and childless, having been shot dead by Horatio Botti (a Genoese gentleman), whose wife Seymour was said to have insulted at Lerici. He was succeeded by his brother Charles Seymour.

Peerage of England
Preceded by John Seymour	Duke of Somerset; 1675–1678	Succeeded by Charles Seymour
Preceded by Charles Seymour	Baron Seymour of Trowbridge; 1665–1678	Succeeded by Charles Seymour
