= Harry Seymour, 9th Marquess of Hertford =

British peer

The Most Honourable The Marquess of Hertford DL
- Born: Henry Jocelyn Seymour, Earl of Yarmouth; 6 July 1958 (age 68)
- Education: Royal Agricultural College
- Spouse: Beatriz Karam (m. 1990)
- Children: 4
- Father: Hugh Seymour

Henry Jocelyn Seymour, 9th Marquess of Hertford, DL (born 6 July 1958) is a British peer, the son of Hugh Seymour, 8th Marquess of Hertford. He was educated at Harrow School and the Royal Agricultural College, Cirencester. He currently resides at Ragley Hall, Warwickshire, where he has been in charge of the estate since 1991.

He was a member of the House of Lords from 1997 to 1999 and is a Deputy Lieutenant of Warwickshire.

== Family life ==
In 1990, he married Brazilian-born Beatriz Karam. They have four children:

- Lady Gabriella Helen Seymour (b. 23 April 1992)
- William Francis Seymour, Earl of Yarmouth (b. 2 November 1993). He is married to Kelsey Wells and they have two sons:

- Clement Andrew, Viscount Beauchamp (b. 29 November 2019) and
- The Honourable Jocelyn William (b. 25 August 2021)

- Lord Edward George Seymour (b. 24 January 1995)
- Lady Antonia Louisa Seymour (b. 24 July 1998)

The Marquess and Marchioness were taken to court by their elder son and heir William Seymour over his claim that he expected to take over Ragley Hall when he turned 30. His relationship with his parents had "deteriorated very sharply" following his marriage in 2018. William also had questioned his father's mental capacity during court hearings in February 2025, but the court ruled in favour of the Marquess who argued that his son's "lack of achievement" and failure to graduate from university would render him unsuitable for managing the estate.

== Arms ==
Coat of arms of Harry Seymour, 9th Marquess of Hertford

Crest
1st: the Bust of a Moor in profile couped at the shoulders proper and wreathed about the temples Argent and Azure (Conway); 2nd: out of a Ducal Coronet Or a Phoenix of the last issuing from flames proper (Seymour)
Escutcheon
Quarterly: 1st and 4th, Sable on a Bend cotised Argent a Rose Gules between two Annulets of the first (Conway); 2nd and 3rd, quarterly: 1st and 4th, Or on a Pile Gules between six Fleurs-de-lis Azure three Lions of England (being the Coat of Augmentation granted by King Henry VIII on his marriage with Lady Jane Seymour); 2nd and 3rd, Gules two Wings joined in lure the tips downwards Or (Seymour)
Supporters
On either side a Blackamoor wreathed about the temples Or and Sable habited in short golden garments and in buskins gold adorned about their waists with green and red feathers each holding in his exterior hand a Shield Azure garnished Or the dexter charged with a Sun in Splendour gold and the sinister with a Crescent Argent
Motto
Fide et Amore (By Faith and Love)

Peerage of Great Britain
Preceded by Hugh Seymour	Marquess of Hertford; 1997–Present	Incumbent
Orders of precedence in the United Kingdom
Preceded by The Marquess of Bath	Gentlemen	Followed by The Marquess of Bute
