= Hugh de Beaumont, 1st Earl of Bedford =

Earl of Bedford from 1137 to 1141

Hugh de Beaumont, 1st Earl of Bedford (born 1106) was Earl of Bedford from 1137 to 1141. The grant of the earldom was by Stephen of England; this was the first of his numerous creations. Hugh was known as Hugh the Pauper or Hugh the Poor.

The existence of this title has been doubted. It is discussed by R. H. C. Davis on the basis of the chronicle evidence. However, it now appears to be accepted by historians that Hugh did receive the earldom of Bedford in 1138.

In 1137 Stephen ordered Miles de Beauchamp, castellan of Bedford Castle, to give it up to Hugh. Miles resisted, and a siege followed. The castle was eventually taken, but Miles repossessed it in an attack.

== Family ==
He was the third son of Robert de Beaumont, 1st Earl of Leicester and Elizabeth de Vermandois.
