= Baron Grey of Powis =

Aristocratic title in the Peerage of England

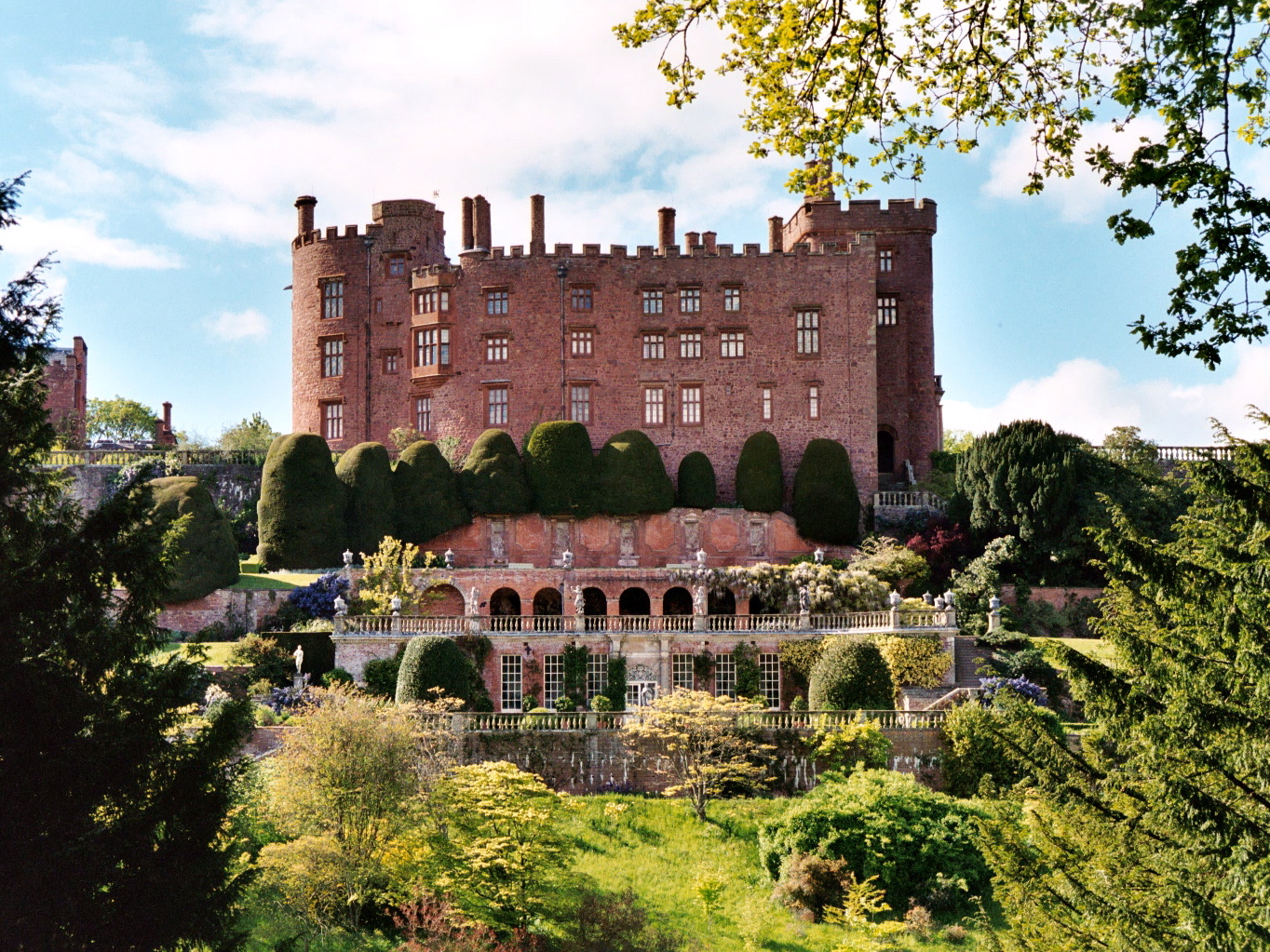
Powis Castle, located in Powys, near the town of Welshpool was originally built c. 1200 as a fortress of the Welsh Princes of Powys. It used to be the residence of the Earl of Powis, it was given to the National Trust by the Herberts in 1952, known for its extensive attractive gardens. Photo taken by Alexander Forst-Rakoczy

The title Baron Grey of Powis (1482–1552) was created for the great-grandson of Joan Charleton (c. 1400–1425), co-heiress and 6th Lady of Powis (Powys) and her husband, Sir John Grey, 1st Earl of Tankerville (1384–1421) after the death of Joan's father, Edward Charleton, 5th Baron Cherleton (1370–1421) left the title in abeyance.

After several generations of Lords Grey of Powis, Joan and John's great-grandson, John Grey, obtained the title "Baron Grey" by Barony Writ of Summons on 15 November 1482. The title passed into abeyance with the death of John Grey, 1st Baron Grey of Powis' grandson, Edward Grey. Edward Grey, illegitimate son of Edward Grey, the last Baron Grey of Powis (died 1551), sold Powis and its castle to his distant relative Sir Edward Herbert, son of William Herbert, 1st Earl of Pembroke (1501–1570) of Wilton House.

== Charleton (Cherleton) descendants share Powis ==
Edward Charleton, 5th Baron Cherleton, married Eleanor Holland, eldest daughter of Thomas Holland, 2nd Earl of Kent, and lord Wake of Liddell and Lady Alice Fitzalan. Their daughters were co-heirs to the Powis legacy:

- Joan married Sir John Grey, valiant military figure for King Henry V of England, resulting in attaining castle and lordship at Tyle, earldom of Tankerville, and governor of the castle at Tournay. John was made Lord of Powis through his marriage to Joan.
- Joyce married John Tiptoft, 1st Baron Tiptoft, whose son John Tiptoft, 1st Earl of Worcester, was attainted of treason in 1478.

Edward, the last Charleton to hold a title of Powis, died in 1422 leaving the title in abeyance.

For a time, the heirs of both Joan and Joyce claimed the title of Powys. John Tiptoft, Joyce's son, was called baron Tiptoft and Powys in his creation to be Earl of Worcester. Joan's great grandson, John Grey was summoned to Parliament as Baron Grey de Powys.

The Greys and Tiptofts divided not only the estates but also Powis Castle near Welshpool, Wales. In 1540 John Leland (died 1552), English poet and antiquary, noted that he found at Castel Coch (English: Red Castle) "two Lords Marchers" castles within one wall. At that time the part of John Sutton, 3rd Baron Dudley, great-grandson of Joyce Tiptoft, was almost in ruin, that of Lord Grey, grandson of Joan the elder sister was "metely good". The outer ward had been the share of the Tiptofts and inner ward that of the Greys.

Lord Dudley sold the Tiptoft/Dudley share of Powis Castle to his nephew the 3rd and last Baron Grey of Powis, son of his sister Margaret, probably before 1538.

== Lords Grey of Powis ==
- Joan Charleton and John Grey, were Lady and 6th Lord of Powis, upon Joan's father's death. He only survived his father-in-law by eight days, being slain in the Battle of Baugé, 22 March 1421. Joan, his widow and the heiress of Powis died about 1425.
- Henry Grey, 2nd Earl of Tankerville (1418–1450) and 7th Lord Powis, Joan and John's son, married Antigone Plantagenet, legitimised daughter of Humphrey, Duke of Gloucester and Eleanor Cobham. Together they had three children: Richard (Henry's successor), Humphrey (who married Eleanor Touchet) and Elizabeth (who married Sir Roger Kynaston. Upon the death of his mother, in 1425, Henry became feudal Lord of Powis, but was under age and the lands placed in the King's hands. 27 October 1425 Henry was granted to John Duke of Bedford. Henry, called "Dominus de Powys," was knighted by Regent, John Duke of Bedford when the King himself was knighted on Whitsuntide 1425/6 documented by a manuscript in the British Museum. 3 July 1434 the Privy Council arranged for payment for Henry's services to the king 40 pounds per year during his minority as recorded in the Acts of Privy Council. In 1442 he received livery of his lands. He was never summoned to Pariliament but was noted in 1444 on the Roll of Parliament as Henry Grey, knight, Lord of Powys.
- Richard Grey, 3rd Earl of Tankerville, Henry and Antigone's son, was the 8th Lord Powis, born on 5 November 1436 at Pontesbury, Shropshire. In 1455 a petition was presented to Parliament by Richard, Lord Powys, and the other coheirs of "Edmund Wodestok, late Earl of Kent" and the Abbot of Kirkstal. Richard married Margaret, daughter of James, Lord Audley. Together they had son John and possibly daughter Elizabeth who married Sir John Ludlow. 12 October 1459 he forfeited his lands, but was pardoned 20 December 1460. In 1461 he obtained the Commission of Array in Shropshire. About 1461, Richard was summoned to Parliament as Lord Grey de Powis and 6th Count of Tankerville. On 1 July 1461 was given stewardship of Ceri, Cedewain, and Montgomery, Wales. He owned land in Shropshire, Worcester and in Wales. He died on 17 December 1466.

Since neither John, Henry nor Richard were called to Parliament as Baron Grey of Powis, rather, referred to as Lord of Powis, they were not made Barons of Powis.

== Barons Grey of Powis ==
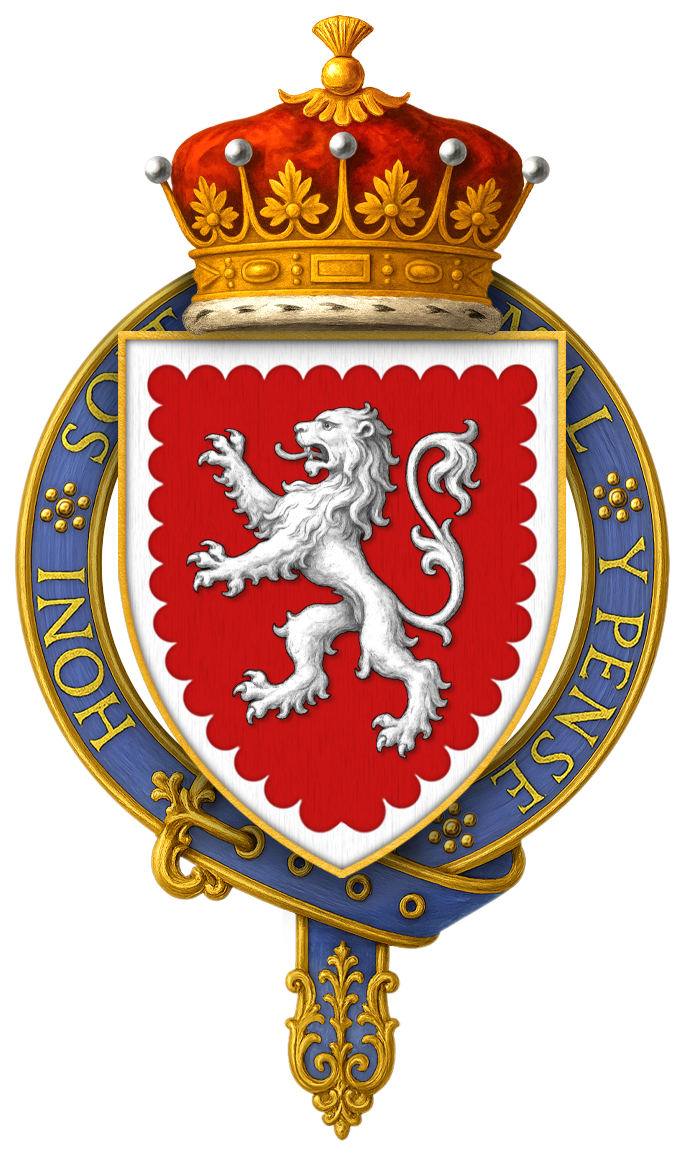
Arms of Grey's, Earls of Tankerville and Barons of Powis: Gules, a lion rampant and a border engrailed, both argent

The next three generations of Powis Greys were called to Parliament and received title of Baron of Powis:

=== John Grey, 1st Baron Grey of Powis ===
John Grey, 1st Baron Grey of Powis (1460–1497), son of Richard, 8th Lord of Powis, was summoned to Parliament as "Johanni Grey de Powes" from 15 November 1482, shortly after attaining his majority until 16 January 1497. Had Commission of the Array in Shropshire in 1484. He owned lands in Shropshire, Worcester and in Wales. John was a patron of minstrels 1482–84 and entertainers 1492–94 in Shrewsbury. In 1492 was with the Earl of Oxford at the sacking of the town of Arches in Picardy, France. He married Lady Anne Herbert, daughter of William Herbert, 1st Earl of Pembroke (1423–1469). William Herbert's will dated 16 July 1468 names husbands to his daughters, including, "Ann to Lord Powys". He died in 1497.

=== John Grey, 2nd Baron Grey of Powis ===
John Grey, 2nd Baron Grey of Powis (1485–1504) was son of John and Lady Anne Herbert Grey. John married Margaret, daughter of Edward Sutton, 2nd Baron Dudley. John died in 1504 at the age of nineteen. His son and heir, Edward, was a year old.

=== Edward Grey, 3rd Baron Grey of Powis ===
Edward Grey, 3rd Baron Grey of Powis (1503–1551). Edward traveled with the Duke of Suffolk to France, including the taking of Bray and other places from the French. In 1525 Edward married Anne Brandon, Baroness Grey of Powys, daughter and co-heir of Charles Brandon, 1st Duke of Suffolk with whom he had no issue. The marriage was not successful and in 1537 Anne left Edward for her lover, Randal Haworth (whom she later married). By the time Anne took Randal as her lover, Edward had already taken a mistress, Jane Orwell [Orrell] by whom he had illegitimate children, and upon whom he would later entail the greater part of his estates comprising the barony of Powys. Anne's father, with the assistance of Thomas Cromwell, forced Grey to support her, and succeeded in obtaining for her an annuity of £100. He also asked Cromwell to help discipline Anne so that she would "live after such an honest sort as shall be to her honor and mine". In 1540, Grey petitioned the Privy Council to punish Anne for adultery, and also accused Anne and Haworth of conspiring to murder him. No action was taken against Anne, and she remained with her lover; however, this scandalous arrangement caused her to be excluded from Charles Brandon's will, which contained generous bequests to her two half-sisters, Frances and Eleanor.

In 1536 King Henry VIII took the lands of the Buildwas Abbey in Shropshire and in July 1537 granted the site of the abbey and all its lands in Shropshire, Staffordshire and Derbyshire to Edward Grey, Lord Powis. On 17 September 1545, the king demised to Edward Grey, Lord Powis, the site of the Abbey of Strata Marcella for 21 years.

Lord Powis, who died at Buildwas and was buried at Pontesbury on 9 July 1551, left no legitimate issue and the barony went into abeyance. He left six illegitimate children by Jane Orwell [Orrell]: Edward, Walter, Andrew, Thomas, Jane, and Cecily or Anne. According to Edward's will dated 11 June 1544, Edward left to his issue:

- barony and lordship of Powys, with his castle and manor of Poole,
- lordships in the county of Montgomery and
- castles and manors of Cherleton and Pontysbury, in the county of Salop.

To Jane Orwell [Orrell] daughter of Sir Lewis Orwell [Orrell] Knight, he left the castle and manor of Charlton, and manor of Pontysbury, during her natural life.

His property and titles he left to his children in the following manner:

- all property and titles and the castles and manors of Cherleton and Pontesbury upon Jane's death to Edward Grey, his illegitimate son by Jane, or if he died with no heirs,
- his next son born by Jane (she was pregnant at the time of this will), or if he died without heirs,
- Jane Grey, my daughter, or if she died without heirs,
- Anne Grey, my other daughter, or if she died without heirs,
- any other daughter of Edwards born to Jane.

In 1568 Edward Grey of London, son of 3rd Baron Grey of Powis, came of age and conveyed the manors of Plas Y Dynas and Trewern in Montgomeryshire to Edward Kynaston, and later the manor of Pontesbury to William Leighton. In 1587 Edward sold the lordship and castle of Powys to his kinsman Sir Edward Herbert, the second son of William Herbert, 1st Earl of Pembroke (1501–1570).

Edward Grey Jr. was Herbert's second cousin through the latter's great-grandfather William Herbert, 1st Earl of Pembroke of Raglan Castle, who was Edward Jr.'s great-great-grandfather. Edward Herbert's son, William Herbert became the 1st Baron Herbert of Powis. The Herberts rebuilt Powis Castle into its current state of splendor.
