= Humphrey Kynaston =

English highwayman

- Died: 1534; Unknown
- Other name: "Wild" Humphrey Kynaston
- Parent(s): Roger and Elizabeth Kynaston
- Conviction: Murder
- Criminal charges: Murder, robbery

Humphrey Kynaston (died 1534), aka Wild Humphrey Kynaston, was an English highwayman who operated in the Shropshire area. The son of the High Sheriff of Shropshire, he was convicted of murder in 1491. After being outlawed, he moved into a cave in the area and lived a lifestyle compared to Robin Hood.

== Biography ==
=== Early life ===
Kynaston was the youngest son of Sir Roger Kynaston (c. 1432/1433–1495), High Sheriff of Shropshire, who was thought to have killed Lord Audley at the Battle of Blore Heath, and Roger's second wife, Lady Elizabeth Grey, daughter of Henry Grey, 2nd Earl of Tankerville and Antigone Plantagenet, the legitimised daughter of Humphrey of Lancaster, 1st Duke of Gloucester (son of Henry IV and Mary de Bohun) and his second wife Eleanor de Cobham. He was raised in Myddle Castle, which Roger had inherited from his first wife Elizabeth Cobham. He received his "wild" nickname from his outrageous lifestyle, which frequently got him into trouble with the law. Kynaston later inherited Myddle Castle from his father, but allowed the estate to fall into disrepair.

=== Marriage and children ===
Kynaston married Isabella ferch Maredudd ap Howell ap Morrice of Oswaldestre (Oswestry), daughter of Maredudd of Glascoed and Thomasina Ireland of Wrexham, Denbighshire. They had six children:

- Margaret Kynaston
- Edward Kynaston
- Thomasina Kynaston
- Robert Kynaston
- Roger Kynaston
- Jana Kynaston

It is further thought that he married Margred ferch William on 4 August 1497, with whom he had another two children:

- Elsbeth Kynaston (b. Cochwilliam, 1502)
- Edward Kynaston of Hordley (born c.1515)

=== Life of a highwayman ===
On 20 December 1491, Kynaston was found guilty of the murder of John Hughes at Stretton, and declared an outlaw by Henry VII. Some time after that, he moved from Myddle castle to a cave in Nesscliffe Rock. Some sources claim that the reason he moved was due to the criminal charges, and others claim that he was outlawed due to debts.

From 1491 to 1518, Kynaston supposedly lived a life that would match the fictional character Robin Hood. It seems he had a reputation for robbing from the rich and giving to the poor. In return, the locals protected him, and gave him and his horse ('Beelzebub') food. One time, in an attempt to capture Kynaston, the local sheriff removed several planks from Montford Bridge, to keep him from crossing the River Severn, but his horse managed to leap and safely clear the distance. It is also said that he was a regular patron at the Old Three Pigeons tavern at Nesscliffe in Shropshire, and his original seat is still there. He may have been pardoned by Henry VII in 1493, but some accounts state that in 1513, Humphrey provided 100 men to aid Henry VIII in France, and in return received a royal pardon 3 to 5 years later.

=== Death ===
Kynaston left a will dated 1 May 1534, which was proved 26 January 1535. While the year of his death is well known, how he died and where are disputed. Some sources claim he lived comfortably in an estate near Welshpool until he died, and others claim he died of illness in his cave.

== Kynaston's Cave ==
Today, the cave is known as Kynaston's Cave, and is located at 52°46′1.78″N 2°54′46.09″W. It has two rooms; Kynaston lived in one, and stabled Beelzebub in the other. The cave also featured an iron door for an entrance. This iron door is said to later have become the door for Shrewsbury gaol. There is also an engraving in the cave, which reads H.K. 1564. Although this engraving is concluded to be made by Humphrey, he was dead 30 years before 1564. However, he did have a grandson, Humfridus (b.1530) who may have left the inscription.

== Theatre adaptation ==
In June 2023, the Moonstruck Astronaut Theatre Company in Newport, Shropshire performed a theatre adaptation of Humphrey Kynaston's life, based on the folktale from Amy Douglas. It was directed by Hannah de Quincey, the artistic director of Moonstruck Astronaut Theatre Company.

The production was performed in Gnosall and was filmed and posted on the Moonstruck Astronaut Youtube channel: https://www.youtube.com/watch?v=7jl-ekDnlI4&t=10s
