= Richard Grey, 3rd Earl of Tankerville =

English noble, Earl of Tankerville from 1450 to 1460

Richard Grey, 3rd Earl of Tankerville, 8th Lord of Powys (5 November 1436 – 17 December 1466), fought on the side of the House of York in the War of the Roses.

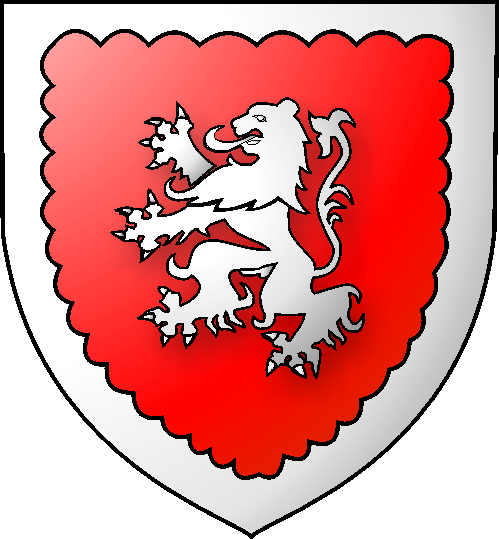

== Background ==
Sir Richard Grey was the son and heir of Henry Grey, 2nd Earl of Tankerville and Antigone Plantagenet (illegitimate daughter of Humphrey of Lancaster, 1st Duke of Gloucester).

Born at Pontesbury, Shropshire on 5 November 1436, he married before 12 January 1458 Margaret Touchet, daughter of James Touchet, 5th Baron Audley (c. 1398–1459), by his second wife, Lady Eleanor Holland, illegitimate daughter of Edmund Holland, 4th Earl of Kent and Princess Constance of York.

== Life ==
The 3rd and last Earl of Tankerville lost his ancestral lands when the English were expelled from France in 1453 at the end of the Hundred Years' War. It does not appear "that this nobleman was ever summoned to Parliament but strong evidence exists that he sat in assembly as a Baron of the Realm in 1455", when it is recorded that he swore allegiance to Henry VI as Sir Richard Grey, Lord of Powis.

In the Wars of the Roses he was with the Duke of York at the Battle of Ludford Bridge on 12 October 1459. His support for the House of York resulted in his being attainted with many others by the Lancastrian Henry VI in 1459, when the Earl of Warwick ordered him to surrender Montgomery Castle. All Grey hereditary titles were forfeited by this attainder, with the earldom of Tankerville (created 1418) becoming extinct. Also deprived of the Lordship of Powis, Henry VI reversed Grey's attainder to this title once he had control of the lands, and had received a promise of loyalty.

In 1461 when Yorkist Edward IV came to the throne Sir Richard Grey received the stewardship of Kerry, Kedwen, and Montgomery. Continuing his Yorkist support, Grey was with Richard Neville, 16th Earl of Warwick, at the Siege of Alnwick Castle in November 1462 recapturing it after the Lancastrians had taken it by siege from the captaincy of his cousin Sir Ralph Grey of Heaton.

Sir Richard Grey died 17 December 1466 and his widow, Margaret Lady of Powis, married secondly (as his 2nd wife) Sir Roger Vaughan, who was executed at Chepstow in 1471. She died before 2 February 1481.

== Family ==
Sir Richard and Lady Grey had a son and a daughter:

- John Grey, 1st Baron Grey of Powis (1461–1497), married Lady Anne Herbert, daughter of William Herbert, 1st Earl of Pembroke and Anne Devereux;
- Elizabeth Grey (1464–1525), married Sir John Ludlow (1458–1495), having two daughters, Alice (who married Humphrey Vernon) and Anne (who married Thomas Vernon of Stokesay, Shropshire).

== See also ==
- Baron Grey of Werke
- Earl Grey

Peerage of England
| Preceded by Henry Grey | Earl of Tankerville; 1450–1460 | Forfeited |
