= Antigone of Gloucester, Countess of Tankerville =

English noblewoman

Antigone of Gloucester
- Countess of Tankerville; Countess of Powis
- Born: 1424 or earlier
- Died: after 1451
- Spouses: Henry Grey, 2nd Earl of Tankerville; Jean d'Armancy
- Issue: Richard Grey, 3rd Earl of Tankerville; Humphrey Grey; Elizabeth Grey
- Parents: Humphrey of Lancaster, 1st Duke of Gloucester

Antigone of Gloucester (bef. 1424 – aft. 1450) was an English noblewoman and the illegitimate daughter of Humphrey of Lancaster, 1st Duke of Gloucester (1390–1447). She was the granddaughter of King Henry IV. She has been thought to have been born between 1425 and 1428 but as her first child, Richard Grey, 3rd Earl of Tankerville, was born in November 1436 it is likely that she was born by 1424 at the very latest and possibly earlier. Her date of death is not known, but it was later than 1451.

== Parentage ==
According to Douglas Richardson's Magna Carta Ancestry, both Antigone and her brother Arthur were illegitimate children of Humphrey, Duke of Gloucester, by "[an] unknown mistress or mistresses". Concrete evidence that Antigone was indeed the illegitimate daughter of Humphrey of Gloucester is found in several sources, one of which is contemporary to Antigone's life. Beaucourt, Histoire de Charles VII 5 (1890): 331 states that letters of legitimisation were given in June 1451 to Antigone, "fille naturelle de Humphroy, duc de Glocester, et femme de Jean d'Amancier, écuyer d'écurie du Roi" [i.e., biological daughter of Humphrey, Duke of Gloucester, and the wife of Jean d'Amancier, esquier of the horse of the king]). The source for this information is "Catalogue des actes, ms. fr. 4139, f. 71 et suiv."

Antigone of Gloucester's parentage is elsewhere attested by no fewer than four visitation sources as follows, the earliest of which dates from c. 1490:

1. W. Harvey et al., Visitation of the North 3 (Surtees Soc. 144) (1930): 53–54 (Gray pedigree dated c.1490: "Gray dominus de Powys = filia ducis Gloucestrie").

2. 1623 Visitation of Shropshire (Harleian Soc. Pub. 29) (1889): 105 (Charleton pedigree: "Henricus Grey Dom. de Powys et Tylle Comes de Tancarville et Camerarius Normanniæ = Antigona filia notha Humfridi Ducia Glouc.").

3. Dwnn, Heraldic Vis. of Wales 1 (1846): 301 (Lords of Powys ped.: "Harry Grey, Earle of Tankerville & Ld of Powys = Antigone, Base daughter to Humphrey, Duke of Glocester.").

4. Williams, Llyfr Baglan (1910): 294–295 (Powis ped. dated c.1600–1607: "The said Sr John Graye and Jane had issue henrye Graye, who was in the right of his said mothere lord powis; he was also bye king henrye the ffifte created Earle of Tanquervile and maried Antigone, base da. to humfrey, duk of gloc', fourth sone to king henrye the fourth, and had issue Richard humfrey and Elizabeth, the wief of Sr Roger kinaston.").

Alison Weir believes that both Antigone and her brother, Arthur, may have been the children of Humphrey and his mistress Eleanor Cobham, whom he later married. She states, after alluding to the births of Antigone and Arthur: "She (Eleanor Cobham) became Humphrey's mistress sometime before their marriage, and may have borne him two bastard children, possibly those listed above,..." There is no contemporary evidence, however, that either Antigone or Arthur were children of Eleanor Cobham.

Jane Kelsall writes: "Eleanore was also very fond of Humphrey's two illegitimate children, Antigone and Arthur, who seem to have had French mothers..." She also says that Humphrey became "enamoured" of Eleanore Cobham on the return trip from Holland to England (i.e., 1425).

Cathy Hartley, in her biography of Eleanor Cobham, states that: "She became Humphrey's mistress and bore him two children." In Duke Humphrey: a sidelight on Lancastrian England, Davis & Lucy argue that Eleanor had to watch Humphrey lavish attention on Antigone: "Eleanor had to watch all this attention given to another woman's child; a bitter thing for a woman with no child of her own."

Weis, et al. claim that "It is often suggested, but without proof, that Eleanor was mother before mar. of Humprey's 2 illegit. chn.: Arthur and Antigone. No proof of their maternity." Gary Boyd Roberts wrote that Eleanor Cobham was "probably the mother of Antigone". Vickers' biography of Humphrey claims that by Humphrey's return to England in 1425: "she (Eleanor) had gained a complete ascendency over her royal lover, to whom she had probably borne two children by this time." He added "She (Eleanor) left no legitimate issue, but she 'may' have been the mother of the two children who called Humphrey father."

== Marriages ==
Antigone married first Henry Grey, 2nd Earl of Tankerville, 7th Earl of Powis (1419–1450). After the death of Henry Grey in 1450, she remarried to Jean d'Amancy (also known as John d'Amancier), Councillor of the Duke of Orléans, Esquire of the Horse to King Charles VII of France.

== Children ==
Antigone had three known children with her husband Henry:

- Richard Grey, 3rd Earl of Tankerville (5 November 1436 – 1466), married Margaret Touchet, daughter of James Touchet, 5th Baron Audley. They had one son, John Grey (died 1497), usually considered the first of the Barons Grey of Powis, who married to Anne Herbert, daughter of William Herbert, 1st Earl of Pembroke, and Anne Devereux. They also had one daughter, Elizabeth Grey, who married Sir John Ludlow, KB, of Hodnet, Shropshire, in 1465.
- Humphrey Grey, married Eleanor Touchet, daughter of James Touchet, 5th Baron Audley.
- Elizabeth Grey (c. 1440–1501?), married before 4 (or 24) August 1465 (date of grant) Sir Roger Kynaston, of Middle, Hordley, and Walford, Shropshire, High Sheriff of Shropshire (c. 1430–1496), and they were parents of Humphrey Kynaston; Roger is thought to have killed James Touchet, 5th Baron Audley (his brother-in-law's uncle by marriage), at the Battle of Blore Heath.

Her descendants are the only known descendants so far of King Henry IV still living in England after 1471. (In Gascony at least, Antigone had cousins, the de Monterrand lords of Lesparre. In England, her illegitimate cousins such as Richard Bedford, who was made an honorary member of the guild of merchant taylors, are harder to track and their lines may have died out.)
