= Kynaston =

Kynaston is a surname, a given name, and a place name, which may refer to:

Surname:

- Sir Roger Kynaston (c. 1433–1495), English knight
- Corbet Kynaston (1690–1740), English politician and Jacobite
- David Kynaston (born 1951), English historian and author
- Edward Kynaston (1709–1772), British landowner and politician
- Edward Kynaston (actor) (c.1640–1706), English actor
- Francis Kynaston (1587–1642, English lawyer, courtier and poet
- Francis Kynaston (died 1590), English politician
- Humphrey Kynaston (died 1534), English highwayman
- Nicolas Kynaston (1941–2025), English organist

Given name:

- William Francis Kynaston Thompson, British soldier
- Kynaston Reeves, also known as Philip Arthur Reeves, English actor
- Kynaston Studd, known as "JEK", British cricketer and businessman

Places

- Kynaston, Herefordshire, hamlet in England
- Kynaston, Shropshire, England
