= Sir Roger Kynaston =

Anglo-Welsh soldier and administrator

Sir Roger Kynaston of Myddle and Hordley (ca. 1433 – 1495) was a Knight of the Realm and Anglo-Welsh nobleman. He was a member of the Kynaston family, of North Shropshire and the Welsh Marches.

== Early life ==
Kynaston was the son of Griffin Kynaston (c. 1402), who was the Seneschal of Ellesmere, Shropshire and Margaret Jane Hoord (c. 1423), daughter of John Hoord of Hordley. He was the direct descendant of Gruffydd Fychan ap Iorwerth, the first to hold the surname "Kynaston" and therefore of Bleddyn ap Cynfyn, the last Prince of Powys, of the House of Mathrafal.

== Marriages and children ==
In 1450 on his marriage to his first wife, Elizabeth Cobham (died 1453), he gained the seat of Myddle Castle, Shropshire, as a dowry. He and Elizabeth had one son, Thomas Kynaston (1453–1513), who married Maria Corbett. Thomas became High Sheriff of Shropshire in 1508.

After the death of his first wife he married, in 1465, Elizabeth Grey (c. 1440 – 1501), daughter of Henry Grey, 2nd Earl of Tankerville and Antigone Plantagenet, granddaughter of Henry IV of England. They had the following children:

- Jana Kynaston (1466)
- Margaret Kynaston (c. 1467), who later married Richard Hanmer (1441 – 1507)
- Humphrey Kynaston, who later became infamous as Wild Humphrey Kynaston, the highwayman, who operated in the area to the North West of Shrewsbury.
- Lancelot Kynaston (1469)
- Maria Kynaston (1470), who married Hywel ap Jenkin
- Emma Kynaston, who married John Eyton, of Rhiwabon (Ruabon)

Elizabeth Grey was the granddaughter of Eleanor Cobham, Elizabeth's sister, and Humphrey of Gloucester, the youngest son of Henry IV.

== Military career ==
In 1454, Kynaston was the Constable of Denbigh Castle. He fought in the Battle of Blore Heath on 23 September 1459, killing the Lancastrian commander Lord Audley. (Kynaston incorporated emblems of the Audley coat-of-arms into his own). He was High Sheriff of Shropshire in both 1461 and 1470. He was knighted in the field in 1471 after the Battle of Tewkesbury. In 1484, he was appointed for life as Escheator and High Sheriff of Merionethshire and made Constable of Harlech Castle.

Guto'r Glyn, the Bard of Valle Crucis Abbey (1445–1475) wrote a "cywydd" in Kynaston's honour entitled "Syr Rosier Cinast o’r Cnewin".

== Heraldry ==
Kynaston founded the line of Kynaston of Hordley. His Coat of Arms was:

Quarterly of six:

1. Ermine, a chevron gules (Kynaston the Audley Coat) – won in battle 1459
2. Vert, two boars passant or (Powys) – Arms of great x4 grandmother, Gweruilla Vychan
3. Gules, on a chevron or three mulletts sable (Franklin) – Arms of great x5 grandfather Griffith Kynaston
4. Argent, on a chief or a raven sable (Hoorde) – Arms of mother's family Margaretta Hoord
5. Gules, a lion rampant argent within a bordure engrailed of the second (Grey de Powys) – Arms of wife's family Elizabetha Grey
6. Or, a lion rampant gules (Bleddyn ap Cynfyn) – Arms of Greatx11 grandfather Bleddyn ap Cynfyn Princeps Walliae who was slain in 1075.

== Plas Kynaston ==
Roger gave his name to the estate of Plas Kynaston, lands which he also owned in Cefn Mawr, North Wales.

Dennis Davies writes in "The History of Plas Kynaston":

"Henry did not receive a rapturous welcome in Wales. On 8 August 1485, at Haverfordwest, he received a crushing blow – John Savage, nephew of Henry's stepfather, and the powerful Welsh lord, Rhys ap Thomas, were not planning to support his cause. Of course, they had promised otherwise while he was in France but Richard III suspected both men of disloyalty – and before Henry landed, he made certain they understood the penalty of treason. With this crushing news, even the professed loyalty of Pembroke was small consolation. Henry's march from Havefordwest northeast to Cardigan and there to Machynlleth (about 100 miles from the Dale settlement) is not documented. He arrived at Machynlleth on 14 August and wrote a letter to Sir Roger Kynaston, the guardian of the Grey estates; to pass safely to Shrewsbury, Henry needed – at the very least – Kynaston's inaction. The guardian didn't need to declare for him but he could at least not impede his progress. Whatever Kynaston's decision, Henry did pass safely through to Shrewsbury. To get to this point, his force had marched through the mountains of Wales but they had the continual arrival of good news to cheer them on the lonely journey – supporters were marching to join them, bringing along much-needed supplies. Among these supporters was Rhys ap Thomas, who finally decided to honour his previous promise. Rhys later said he brought almost 2000 men with him; if true, his force made up a third of Henry's entire army. They were in time to join Henry at Shrewsbury, the traditional gateway to the English midlands; they marched along the old Roman road even as supporters sent along money to pay the mercenary troops. But at Shrewsbury, Henry's progress was no longer easy".

== Bibliography ==
- Plantagenet Ancestry; A Study in Colonial and Medial Families, 2nd Edition (2011) by Douglas Richardson
