= Thomas Dutton =

English knight

- Born: 1 August 1421
- Died: 23 September 1459 (aged 38)
- Spouse: Anne Touchet
- Children: 10
- Military career
- Allegiance: King Henry VI
- Conflicts: War of the Roses

Sir Thomas Dutton (1 August 1421 – 23 September 1459) was a medieval English knight. He was the son of Sir John Dutton and Margaret Savage.

His family owned an estate, Dutton Hall in Cheshire. The original building is now located in West Sussex, having been moved there in the 1930s; the building housed Stoke Brunswick School, at Ashurst Wood, south of East Grinstead.

Sir Thomas Dutton, his brother John, his eldest son Peter Dutton, and his father-in-law Lord Audley all died on 23 September 1459 at the Battle of Blore Heath, during the War of the Roses. Lord Audley was in command of approximately 10,000 troops defending the throne of King Henry VI.

== Marriages and issue ==
Sir Thomas Dutton married Anne Touchet, daughter of James Touchet, 5th Baron Audley of Heighley Castle and Margaret De Ros. Their children were:

- Peter Dutton
- Margaret Dutton; married, firstly, Thomas Aston; married, secondly, Ralph Vernon
- Anne Dutton; married Sir Thomas Molyneux of Sefton, Lancashire, knight banneret
- Isabel Dutton; married Sir Christopher Richard de Southworth
- Maud Dutton; married William Booth
- John Dutton (b. circa 1444 – d. circa 1473); married Margaret Molyneux
- Eleanor (Alinora) Dutton; married Richard Cholmondeley, Esq. (d. b 1488)
- Elizabeth Dutton; married Ralph Bostock
- Alice Dutton
- Laurence Dutton (b. circa 1458 – d. after 1522)

In 1527, at the death of Laurence Dutton of Dutton without a male heir, Dutton property passed to Sir Piers Dutton of Hatton whose right was contested by heirs-general of Sir Hugh Dutton. In 1534, Termination of the Dutton lawsuit by award of Henry VIII (16 May) by which Sir Piers Dutton of Hatton became owner of Dutton, confirmed by Act of Parliament in 1536.
