= Peter Bennett, 10th Earl of Tankerville =

British peer (born 1956)

Peter Grey Bennet, 10th Earl of Tankerville (born 18 October 1956) is a British peer and musician. Until 1980 he was entitled to the courtesy title of Lord Ossulston.

As a member of the House of Lords from 1980 until 1999 he was not a member of a political group.

The only son of Charles Augustus Grey Bennet, 9th Earl of Tankerville, and Georgiana Lilian Maude Wilson, his father's second wife, a daughter of the Rev. Gilbert Wilson, doctor of divinity, he was educated at Grace Cathedral School, San Francisco, Oberlin Conservatory, where he graduated as a Bachelor of Music, and San Francisco State University, where he took an M.A.

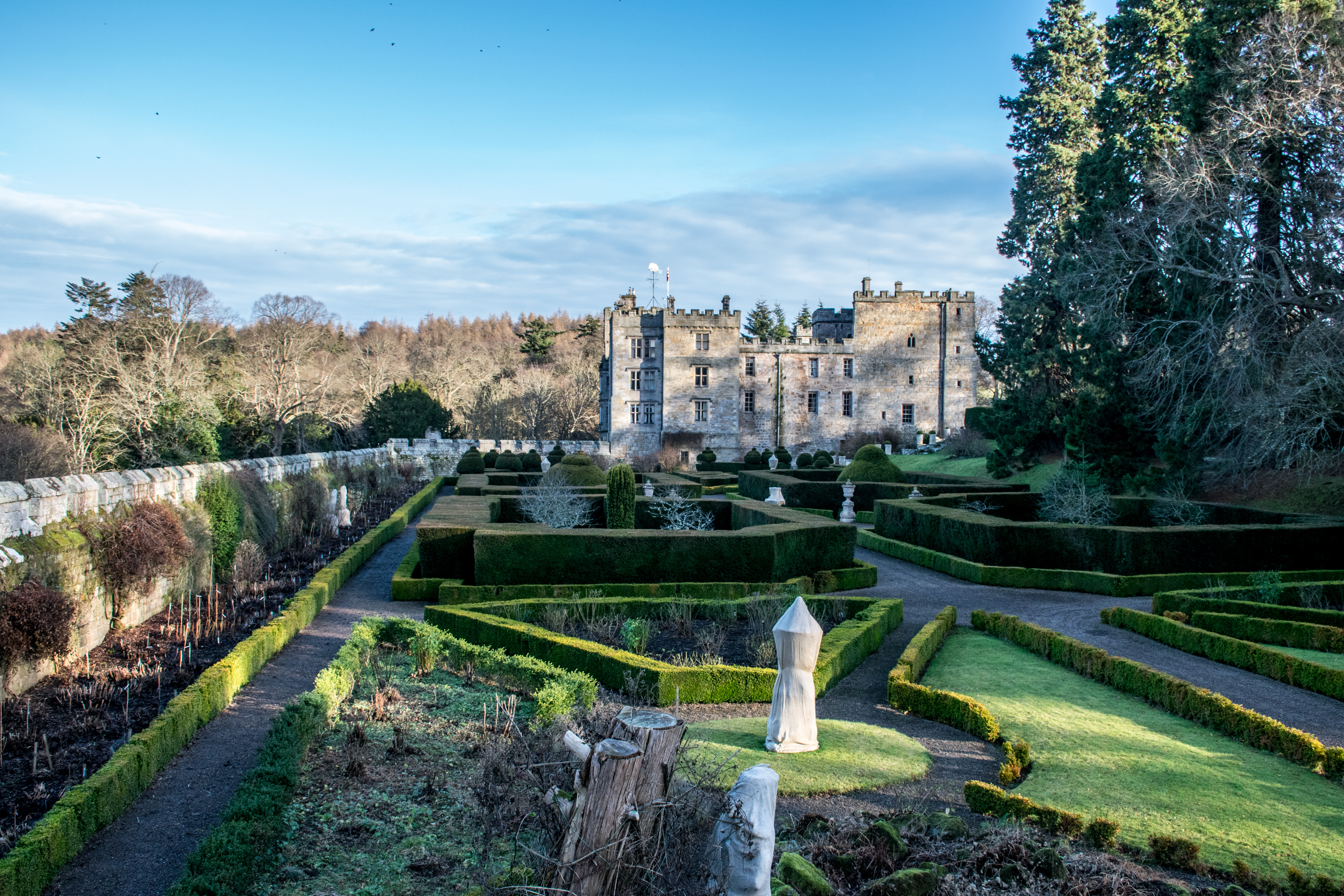
Chillingham Castle and gardens in Northumberland

On 27 April 1980 he succeeded to the peerages of Baron Ossulston in the peerage of England (1682) and Earl of Tankerville in the peerage of Great Britain (1714). Soon after this, the landed estate at Chillingham Castle was sold.

In 2003, Tankerville was living in San Francisco and working as a musician.
