= Château de Tancarville =

Castle in Seine, France

- Tancarville in France
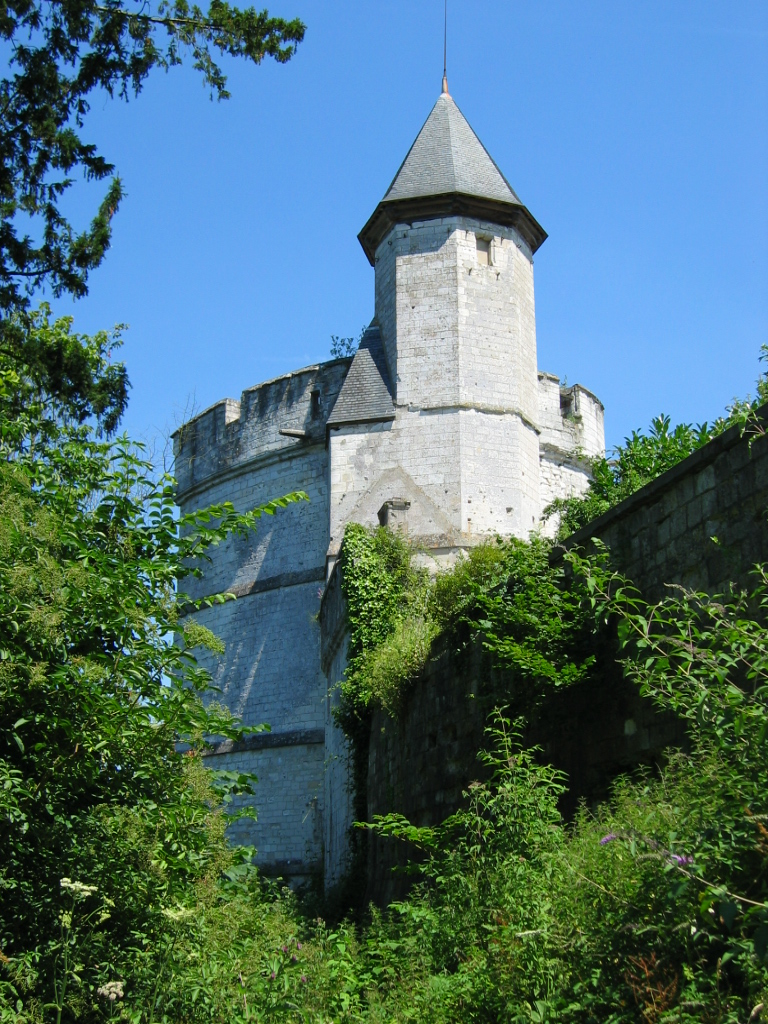

Site information
- Owner: S.C.I. SAQQARA

Location
- Location within France
- Coordinates: 49°29′3″N 0°27′51″E

Garrison information
- Occupants: Raoul de Tancarville

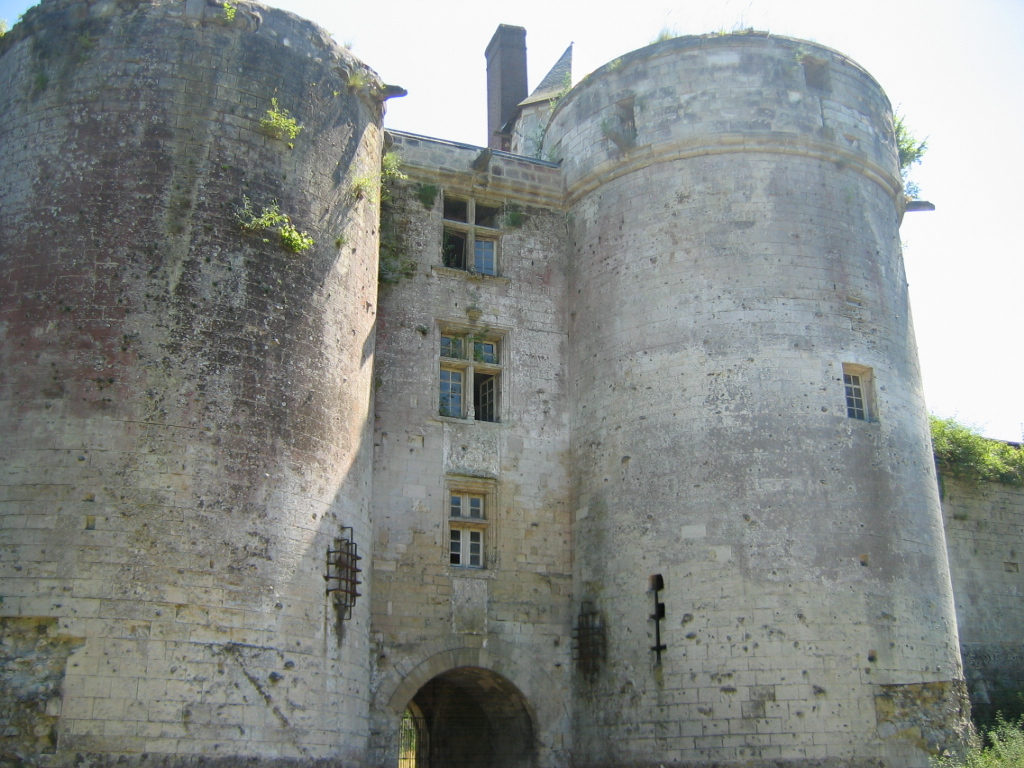

Château de Tancarville is an 11th-century castle on a cliff overlooking the Seine near Tancarville in Seine-Maritime, Normandy, France.

It has been classified as a Monument historique since 1862 by the French Ministry of Culture.

== History ==
Raoul, chamberlain of the Duke of Normandy, first had walls and the old tower built. In the 12th century the square tower with walls 1.65 metres thick was built. In 1316, Jeanne de Tancarville, sole heiress, married Jean II de Melun and their son became the second earl of Tancarville. In 1417, the Countess Marguerite married Jacques d'Harcourt . In 1418 at the time of the conquest of Normandy by Henry V of England, the title of Count of Tancarville was given to John Grey, while in the kingdom of France it was used by the House of Harcourt who recovered the castle after the departure of the English.

In 1709, a wing in classical style was added to the medieval parts of the building by the Count of Evreux. On 30 June 1718, financier John Law acquired it from Evreux, but does not appear to have ever resided there. After the French Revolution in 1789, the castle was looted and partly burned down.

For 29 years, from 1910 to 1939, the castle was rented by Mr. Fernand Prat and his wife born Jehanne Leblanc (sister of Maurice Leblanc) who received many personalities of the arts and letters such as Maurice Maeterlinck and his companion Georgette Leblanc, Colette, Margaret Caroline Anderson, James Joyce, Bertrand de Jouvenel, Pierre Lecomte Nouy and Louis Fabulet.

In the 1960s, the castle served as a summer camp for children in the area.

The title of Earl of Tankerville is still extant in the Peerage of Great Britain.

The castle now belongs to Saqqara, a real estate company in Figeac (Lot), which has been offering luxury apartments since 2001. While waiting to be renovated, it remains closed to the public.

== See also ==
- List of castles in France
