= Earl of Tankerville =

English and British title of nobility

Earldom of Tankerville
- Arms of Bennett, Earls of Tankerville: Gules, three demi-lions rampant, argent, and in the centre point a bezant.
- Creation date: 1418 (first creation); 1695 (second creation); 1714 (third creation)
- Created by: Henry V (first creation); William III (second creation); George I (third creation)
- Peerage: Peerage of Great Britain
- First holder: John Grey, 1st Earl of Tankerville
- Present holder: Peter Bennett, 10th Earl of Tankerville
- Heir presumptive: Adrian Bennett
- Subsidiary titles: Baron Ossulton
- Extinction date: 1459 (first creation); 1701 (second creation)
- Former seat: Chillingham Castle
- Motto: De bon vouloir servir le roy ("To serve the king with good will")

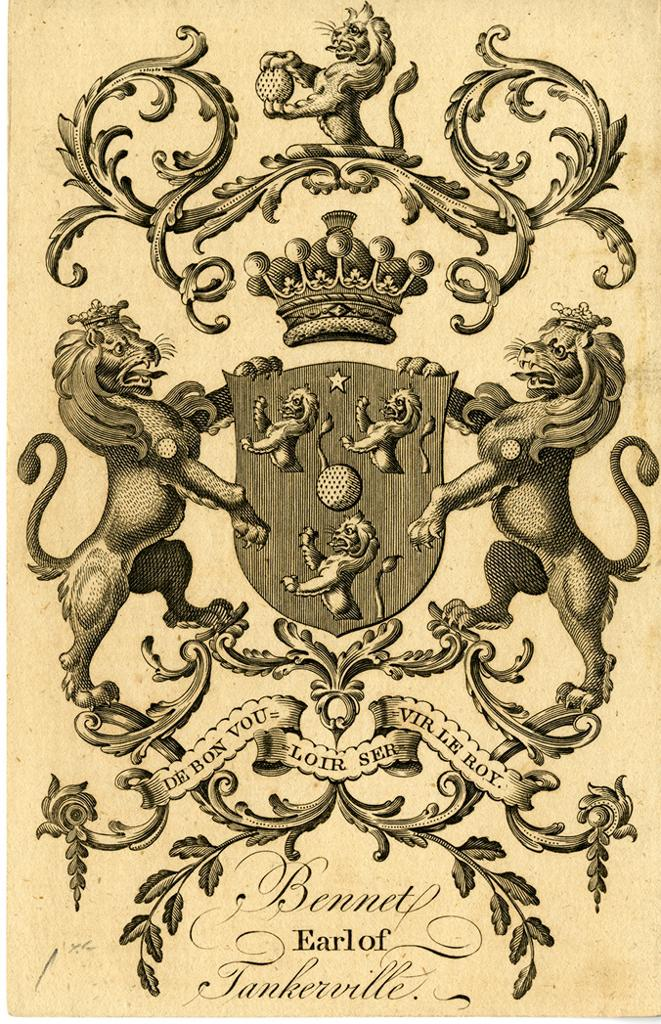
Bookplate showing the arms of the Earls of Tankerville (third creation): Gules, a bezant between three demi lions rampant argent. Crest – A double scaling ladder or. Another crest – Out of a mural crown or, a lion's head gules on the neck a bezant. Supporters – Two lions argent ducally crowned or, each charged on the shoulder with a torteau. Coronet – That of an Earl. Motto – De bon vouloir servir le roy.

Earl of Tankerville is a noble title drawn from Tancarville in Normandy. The title has been created three times: twice in the Peerage of England, and once (in 1714) in the Peerage of Great Britain for Charles Bennet, 2nd Baron Ossulston. His father, John Bennett, 1st Baron Ossulston, was the elder brother of Henry Bennett, 1st Earl of Arlington. The family seat was Chillingham Castle in Northumberland.

The Earl of Tankerville holds the subsidiary title of Baron Ossulston, of Ossulston in the County of Middlesex (1682), in the Peerage of England.

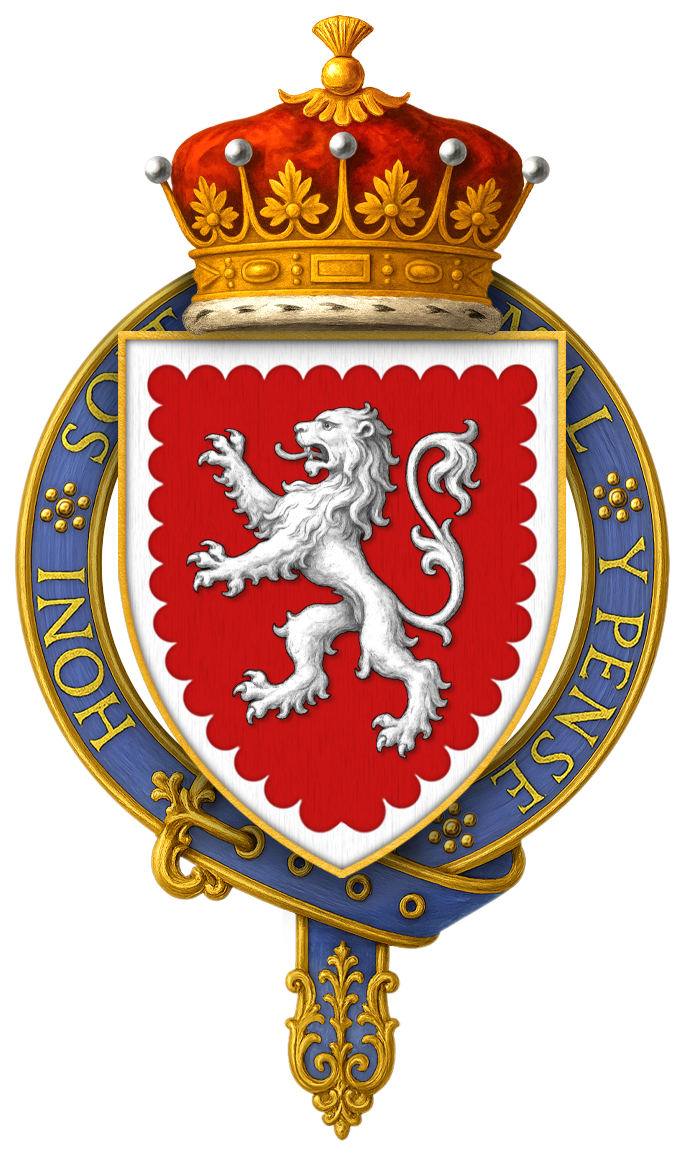
Arms of John Grey, 1st Earl of Tankerville

== Earls of Tankerville, First Creation (1418) ==
- John Grey, 1st Earl of Tankerville (1384–1421)
- Henry Grey, 2nd Earl of Tankerville (1419–1450)
- Richard Grey, 3rd Earl of Tankerville (1436–1466) (lands lost 1453, forfeit 1459)

== Earls of Tankerville, Second Creation (1695) ==
- see Baron Grey of Werke

== Barons Ossulston (1682) ==
- John Bennet, 1st Baron Ossulston (1616–1695)
- Charles Bennet, 2nd Baron Ossulston (1674–1722) (created Earl of Tankerville in 1714)

== Earls of Tankerville, Third Creation (1714) ==
- Charles Bennet, 1st Earl of Tankerville (1674–1722)
- Charles Bennet, 2nd Earl of Tankerville (1697-1753)
- Charles Bennet, 3rd Earl of Tankerville (1716–1767)
- Charles Bennet, 4th Earl of Tankerville (1743–1822)
- Charles Bennet, 5th Earl of Tankerville (1776–1859)
- Charles Bennet, 6th Earl of Tankerville (1810–1899)
  - Charles Bennett, Lord Ossulston (1850–1879)
- George Montagu Bennet, 7th Earl of Tankerville (1852–1931)
- Charles Augustus Ker Bennett, 8th Earl of Tankerville (1897–1971)
- Charles Augustus Grey Bennett, 9th Earl of Tankerville (1921–1980)
- Peter Grey Bennett, 10th Earl of Tankerville (born 1956)

The present earl lives in West London. His cousin Adrian George Bennett (b. 1958) is heir presumptive.

Line of succession
- Charles Bennett, 8th Earl of Tankerville (1897–1971)
  - Charles Bennett, 9th Earl of Tankerville (1921–1980)
    - Peter Bennett, 10th Earl of Tankerville (born 1956)
  - Rev. Hon. George Arthur Grey Bennet (1925–2001)
    - (1). Adrian George Bennet (born 1958)
    - (2). Neil Robert Bennet (born 1961)

== See also ==
- Earl of Arlington
- Tancarville castle
- House of Harcourt
