= Audley's Cross =

Coordinates: 52.91419°N 2.42598°W

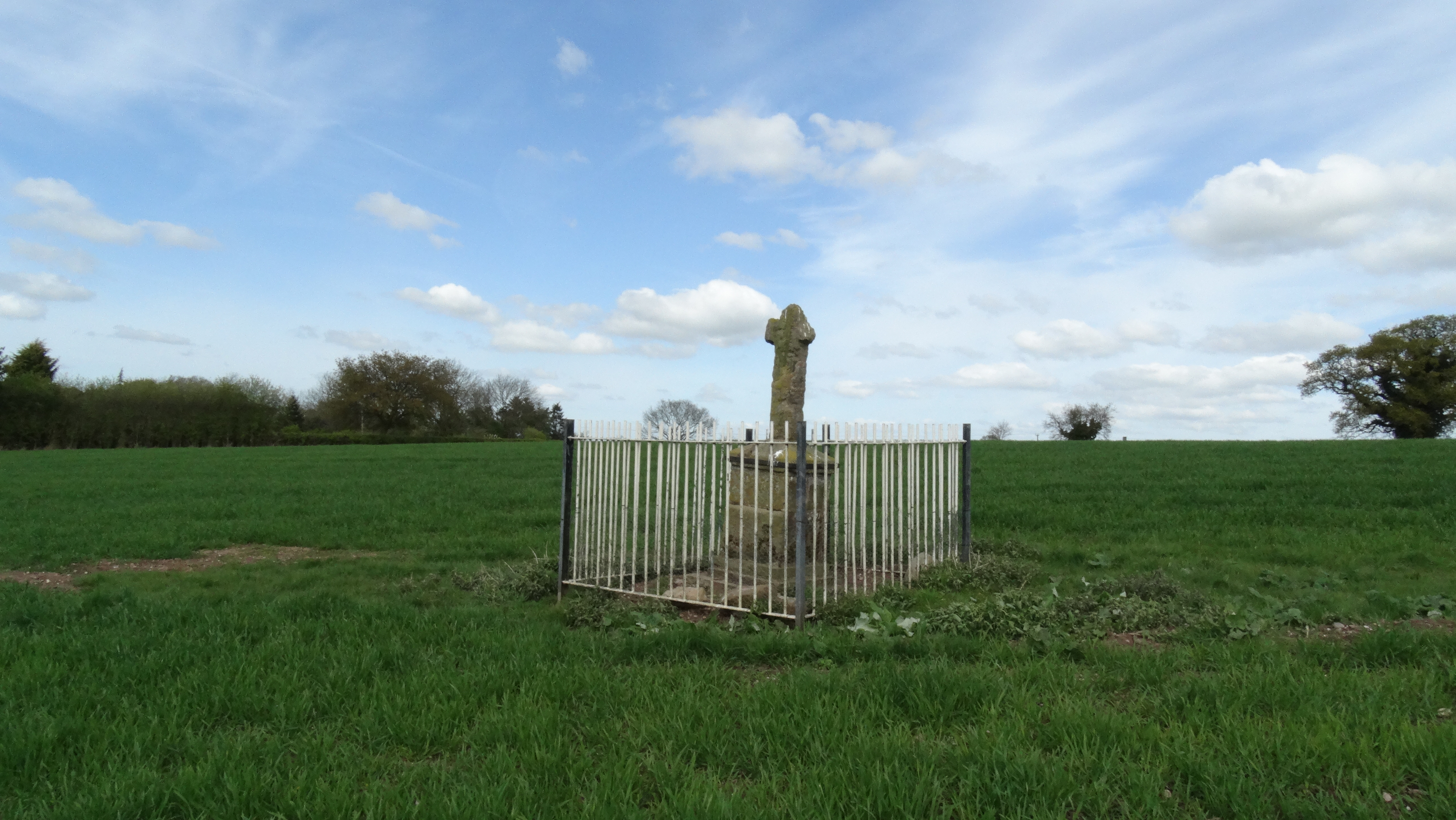
Audley's Cross

Audley's Cross is a cross sited in Blore Heath, Staffordshire to mark the spot on which James Touchet, Lord Audley was killed at the battle of Blore Heath in 1459.

A cross was erected on the spot where Audley was reported to have been killed after the battle, and replaced with the current stone cross in 1765, which was renovated in 1959 on the 500th anniversary of the battle.

The inscription on the cross reads:

On this spot was fought the Battle of Blore Heath 1459. Lord Audley, who commanded the Lancastrian forces was defeated and slain. This monument was restored by Tyrley Parish Council to mark the 500th anniversary of the battle
