= John Grey, 1st Earl of Tankerville =

English peer

John Grey
- Earl of Tankerville; Lord of Powys, jure uxoris
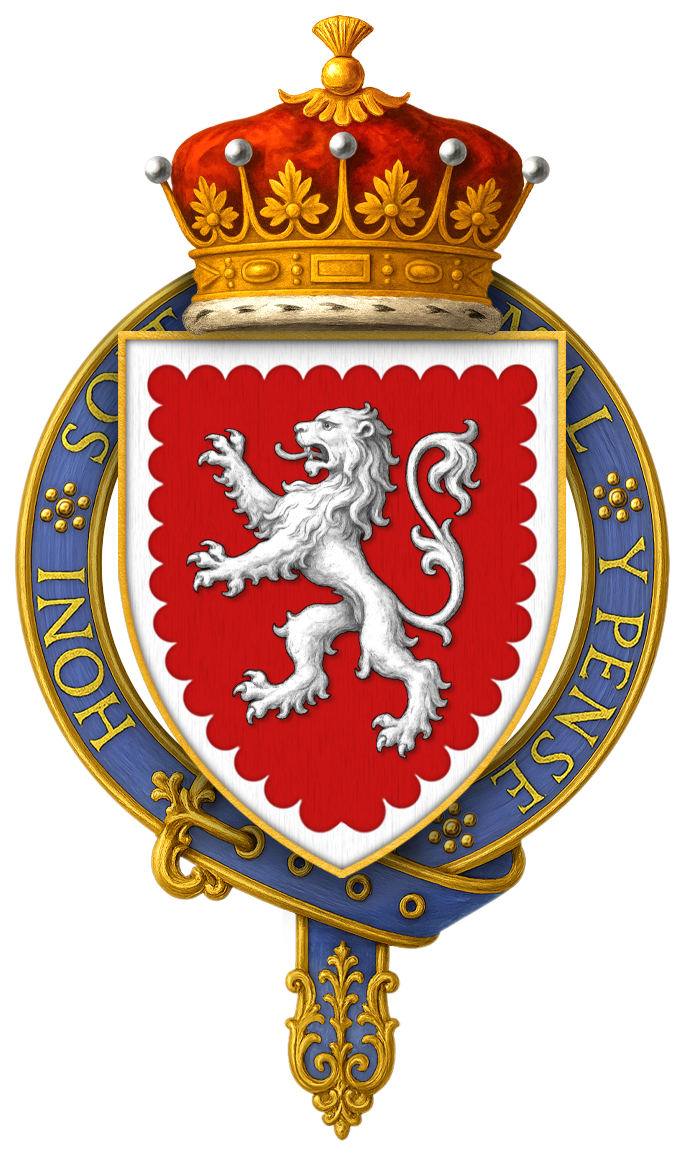
- Arms of Sir John Grey, 1st Earl of Tankerville, KG
- Born: after 1384
- Died: 22 March 1421
- Spouse: Joan de Cherleton
- Issue: Henry Grey, 2nd Earl of Tankerville
- Father: Sir Thomas Grey
- Mother: Joan Mowbray

John Grey, 1st Earl of Tankerville jure uxoris 6th Lord of Powys (after 1384 – 22 March 1421), KG, was an English peer who served with distinction in the Hundred Years' War between England and France under King Henry V.

== Origins ==
John Grey was the second son of Sir Thomas Grey (1359– 26 November 1400), of Berwick and Chillingham Castle, by his wife Joan Mowbray (d. 1410), a daughter of John de Mowbray, 4th Baron Mowbray by Elizabeth de Segrave.

=== Grey family ===
Sir Thomas Grey (1343/4) of Heton, Islandshire in Northumberland, married a certain Agnes, a lady of unrecorded parentage. He fought in many battles for the English king on the Marches of the Scottish borders. He was succeeded by his son:

- Sir Thomas Grey (d.1374)), the chronicler, who married Margaret de Pressene, a daughter William de Pressene, of Presson, Northumberland. Pugh 1988, pp. 103, 187, 196 Sir Thomas fought in many battles, besieged castles, and recorded the events he witnessed in a celebrated historical account of the campaigns known as Scalacronica, published in 1369. He died leaving a son Sir Thomas Grey (born 1384), aged ten.
- Sir Thomas Grey (1384–1415), who married Alice Neville, a daughter of Ralph de Neville, 1st Earl of Westmorland. He was executed 2 August 1415 for his part in the Southampton Plot.
- Sir Henry Grey of Ketteringham, Norfolk, who married Emme Appleyard.
- William Grey (Bishop of Lincoln) (d. 1436).
- Maud Grey (1382–1451), who married Sir Robert Ogle (d. 12 August 1436) of Ogle, Northumberland.

== Hundred Years War ==
Between 1408 and 1413 Henry V granted Grey three annuities, and on 8 August 1415 gave him the forfeited estates of his brother, Sir Thomas Grey, executed for his part in the Southampton Plot.

Grey fought at Agincourt in 1415. On 1 August 1417 Henry V launched his second invasion of Normandy, and in that year Grey was Captain of Mortagne in October 1417, and was with the King at the siege of Caen, where his valiant conduct caused the King to name him a Knight of the Garter. Henry V granted the castle and seigneurie of Tilly in Normandy in November 1417, recently forfeited by Sir William Harcourt, a supporter of the King's enemies.

Grey was subsequently sent with a guard to Powys to bring the recently captured Lollard leader, Sir John Oldcastle, before Parliament.

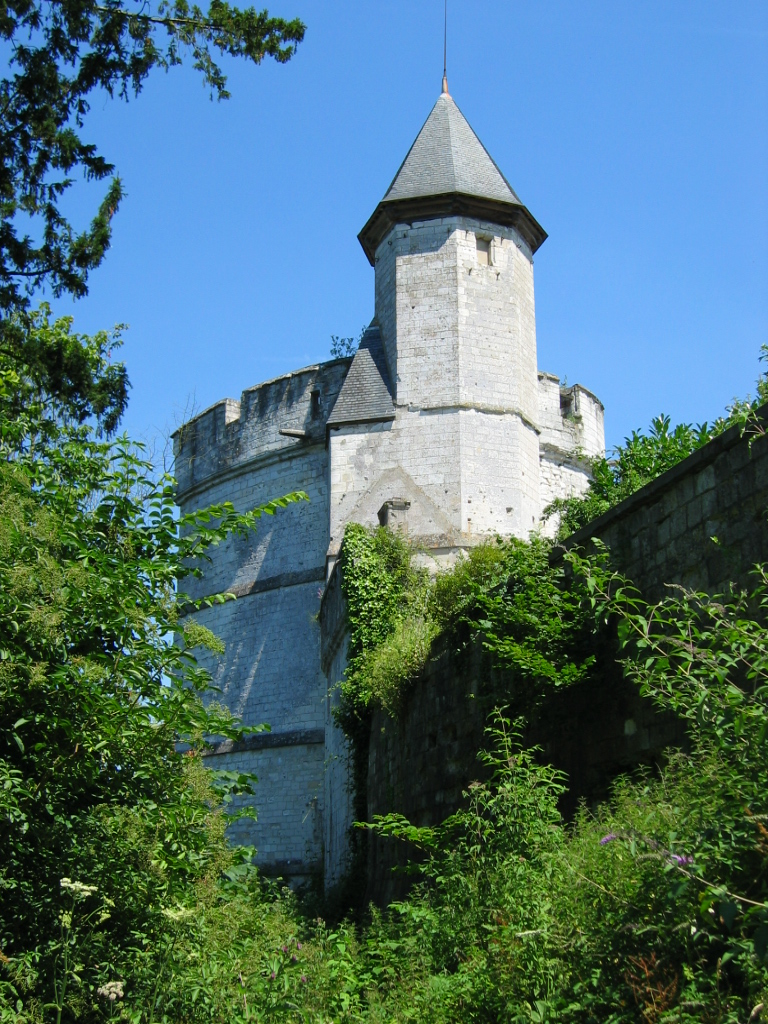
The 12th century Chateau de Tancarville, Normandy. In 1419 John Grey was granted the comté of Tancarville

In 1419 he was again in France as Captain of Mantes, and on 31 January 1419 (20 January 1418 old style) was granted the comté of Tancarville in Normandy to hold by grand sergeanty of delivery of a bascinet helmet at the Castle of Roan on Saint George's Day each year. Grey's continued service in the French wars earned him further grants, and he was made governor of the Castle of Tournay. On 31 January 1418/9 he was created a Knight of the Garter. In 1420 he was Captain of Harfleur, and by that date was one of the leading landowners in Normandy.

On 22 March 1420/1, while fording a river near the Chateau de Beaufort at the Battle of Baugé, Grey, Thomas of Lancaster, 1st Duke of Clarence, and many other of the English nobility were slain by a Franco-Scottish force, having incautiously engaged the enemy without proper preparation and with no archers in support.

== Marriage and issue ==
In 1418 Grey married Joan de Cherleton, 6th Lady of Powys (c. 1400 – 17 September 1425), daughter and co-heiress of Edward Charleton, 5th Baron Cherleton, by his wife Eleanor Holland, widow of Roger Mortimer, 4th Earl of March. In his wife's right, Grey succeeded to the title of Lord Powis with its estates, including one moiety of Powis Castle, the other half having been inherited by his wife's sister Joyce de Cherleton, wife of John Tiptoft, 1st Baron Tiptoft. This arrangement remained in place until in the 1530s Joyce's great-grandson John Sutton, 3rd Baron Dudley sold the Tiptoft moiety of Powis Castle to his nephew, the 3rd and last Baron Grey of Powis. Joan de Cherleton survived her husband and in her widowhood in 1425 became heiress to her step-brother, Edmund Mortimer, 5th Earl of March, who had earlier been the focus of the Southampton Plot. By his wife he had a son and only child and heir:

- Henry Grey, 2nd Earl of Tankerville (c. 1418/19 – 13 January 1450), Henry Grey was knighted in 1426 and married Antigone in France, the illegitimate daughter of Humphrey, Duke of Gloucester. During the 1430s and 1440s the French Kings Charles VI and the dauphin, Philip regained much of the territory lost to the Valois monarchy. Having lost his lands and fortune at Tancarville, the Count died on about 13 Jan 1449/50. His title became extinct.

== Bibliography ==
- Burke, Bernard (1866). A genealogical history of the dormant, abeyant, forfeited, and extinct peerages of the British Empire. London.
- Cokayne, George E.; Gibbs, Vicary; Doubleday, Harry A. (1949). The Complete Peerage of Great Britain and Ireland. London.
- Milner, J.D. (October 2006). "The Battle of Baugé, March 1421: Impact and Memory". History. 91 (304): 484–507. doi:10.1111/j.1468-229x.2006.00375.x.
- Mosley, Charles (1999). Burke's Peerage and Baronetage. London.
- Pugh, T.B. (1988). Henry V and the Southampton Plot of 1415. Alan Sutton. ISBN 0-86299-541-8
- Richardson, Douglas (2011). Magna Carta Ancestry: A Study in Colonial and Medieval Families, ed. Kimball G. Everingham. Vol. I (2nd ed.). Salt Lake City. ISBN 1449966373
- Richardson, Douglas (2011). Magna Carta Ancestry: A Study in Colonial and Medieval Families, ed. Kimball G. Everingham. Vol. II (2nd ed.). Salt Lake City. ISBN 1449966381
- Richardson, Douglas (2011). Magna Carta Ancestry: A Study in Colonial and Medieval Families, ed. Kimball G. Everingham. Vol. III (2nd ed.). Salt Lake City. ISBN 144996639X

Peerage of England
New creation	Earl of Tankerville; 1418/1419–1421	Succeeded by Henry Grey
