= Kynaston, Shropshire =

Hamlet in Shropshire, England

Coordinates: 52.775°N 2.958°W

Kynaston
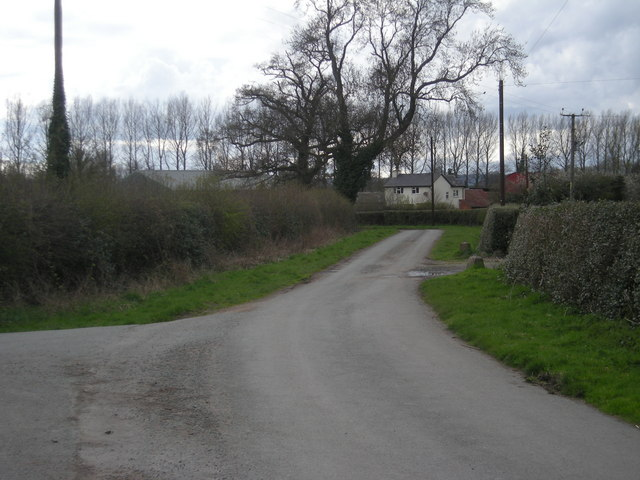
- Junction with MoD track, Kynaston

- Location within Shropshire
- OS grid reference: SJ354201
- Civil parish: Kinnerley
- Unitary authority: Shropshire
- Ceremonial county: Shropshire
- Region: West Midlands
- Country: England
- Sovereign state: United Kingdom
- Post town: OSWESTRY
- Postcode district: SY10
- Dialling code: 01691
- Police: West Mercia
- Fire: Shropshire
- Ambulance: West Midlands
- UK Parliament: North Shropshire

Kynaston is an English hamlet in the parish of Kinnerley, Shropshire.

The place-name appears in the 1086 Domesday Book in the spelling of Chimerstun, but this is known to be corrupt. The origin of the name, as determined by later medieval records, is Cyneweardes-tūn, meaning `the farm of a man called Cyneweard'.

This Kynaston pre-dates the village in Herefordshire also called Kynaston.

It was described in 1870 as "KYNASTONE, a township in Kinnerley parish, Salop; 7½ miles SE of Oswestry. Pop., 135."

The name is intimately linked with the Kynaston family, the first to carry the surname being Gruffydd Kynaston of Cae Howel, a settlement in the locality.
