= Henry Grey, 2nd Earl of Tankerville =

English peer

Henry Grey, 2nd Earl of Tankerville (1420 – 5 January 1450) was an English peer. He was the son of John Grey, 1st Earl of Tankerville and his wife Joan Charleton, the 6th Lady of Powys as co-heiress of her father Edward Charlton.

== Life ==
He became the 2nd Earl of Tankerville on 22 March 1421 (12 March 1420 under the English calendar at the time) and was invested as a knight on May 19 1426.

Tankerville had Sir Gruffudd Vychan summarily executed in Powis Castle in 1447, in violation of a safe conduct given. It is not known whether he suspected Vychan of Yorkist sympathies, whether it was in retribution for the death of Sir Christopher Talbot at Sir Gruffudd's hand, or whether he wished to eliminate Vychan's claim to Powis.

== Marriage and issue ==
He married Antigone Plantagenet, legitimised daughter of Humphrey of Lancaster, 1st Duke of Gloucester. By her he had three children:

- Richard Grey, 3rd Earl of Tankerville, married Margaret Touchet, daughter of James Touchet, 5th Baron Audley
- Humphrey Grey, married Eleanor Touchet, daughter of James Touchet, 5th Baron Audley
- Elizabeth Grey (c. 1440 – 1501?), married Sir Roger Kynaston, High Sheriff of Shropshire (c. 1430 – 1495/1517); Roger is thought to have killed Lord Audley at the Battle of Blore Heath, and they were parents of Humphrey Kynaston.

Peerage of England
Preceded by John Grey	Earl of Tankerville; 1421–1450	Succeeded by Richard Grey
