= James Tuchet, 5th Baron Audley =

English peer

The Right Honourable; The Baron Audley
- Baron Audley
- Arms of Tuchet: Ermine, a chevron gules
- Tenure: 1408 – 1459
- Predecessor: John Tuchet, 4th Baron Audley
- Successor: John Tuchet, 6th Baron Audley
- Other titles: Baron Tuchet
- Born: James Tuchet c. 1398; Staffordshire, England
- Died: 23 September 1459 (aged 60–61); Shropshire, England
- Buried: Darley Abbey, Derby, England
- Spouses: Margaret de Ros (m. 1415); Eleanor de Holland (m. 1430)
- Issue: 10, including John and Edmund
- Parents: John Tuchet; Elizabeth Stafford

James Tuchet, 5th Baron Audley, 2nd Baron Tuchet (c. 1398 – 23 September 1459) of Heleigh Castle was an English peer.

James Tuchet, 5th Baron Audley, son of Elizabeth Stafford and her husband John Tuchet, 4th Baron Audley, was a distinguished veteran of the Hundred Years' War. In the opening phase of the Wars of the Roses he raised troops from his estates in Cheshire, Shropshire, Staffordshire and Derbyshire and commanded the Lancastrian force that moved to block the Yorkist Earl of Salisbury's route to Ludlow where he intended linking up with the rest of the Yorkist army.

The two forces clashed in the Battle of Blore Heath on 23 September 1459 and Audley was killed by Sir Roger Kynaston of Stocks near Ellesmere (Kynaston incorporated emblems of the Audley coat-of-arms into his own). Audley's Cross still stands on the battlefield marking the spot where he died.

Audley was buried in Darley Abbey, north of Derby, about 40 miles (64 km) away from Blore Heath. The Abbey no longer stands, so his final resting place is no longer marked.

== Marriages and children ==
Audley married twice:

- Firstly, having obtained a marriage licence dated 24 February 1415, to Margaret de Ros (c. 1400 - before 14 February 1430), daughter of Margaret FitzAlan (D'Arundel) and her husband William de Ros, 6th Baron de Ros. They were granted a Papal Dispensation for being related in the 3rd and 4th degrees of kindred. Together they had three children:
  - John Tuchet, 6th Baron Audley (c. 1426 - 26 September 1490), son and heir.
  - Elizabeth Touchet (c. 1420 - before 8 November 1464), who married Edward Brooke, 6th Baron Cobham.
  - Anne Touchet (c. 1424 - 1503), who married Sir Thomas Dutton, who died at the Battle of Blore Heath (1459) along with his father-in-law.
- Secondly, having obtained a marriage licence on 14 September 1430, he married Eleanor de Holland, an illegitimate daughter of Edmund Holland, 4th Earl of Kent and his mistress Constance of York, daughter of Infanta Isabella of Castile and Edmund of Langley, 1st Duke of York. They too were granted a Papal Dispensation, as they were related in the 3rd and 3rd degrees of affinity. With Eleanor de Holland he had a further seven children as follows:
  - Sir Humphrey Touchet (c. 1434 - 6 May 1471), who married Elizabeth Courtenay, widow of Sir James Luttrell (1426/7-1461) of Dunster Castle in Somerset, feudal baron of Dunster, (who died fighting for the Lancastrian cause at the Battle of St Albans in 1461) and a daughter of Sir Philip Courtenay (1404–1463) of Powderham in Devon. Like his father, he supported the House of Lancaster. He was taken prisoner at the battle of Tewkesbury and tried before Richard, Duke of Gloucester and the Duke of Norfolk. Executed with other Lancastrian leaders in the Market Square he was buried under the pavement in the Chapel of St Nicolas, in the Abbey Church of St Mary the Virgin.
  - Thomas Touchet (c. 1440 - June 1507), who married a certain Catherine.
  - Edmund Audley (c. 1443 - 23 August 1524), who served successively Bishop of Rochester, Bishop of Hereford and Bishop of Salisbury.
  - Margaret Touchet (c. 1431 - before 2 February 1481), who at some time before 12 January 1459 married Richard Grey, 3rd Earl of Tankerville, son of Sir Henry Grey, 2nd Earl of Tankerville and Antigone Plantagenet.
  - Constance Touchet (born c. 1432), who in 1464 married (as his second wife) Sir Robert Whitney (1436 - aft. 1467), an active participant in the Wars of the Roses, son of Eustace Whitney (?-1468) and Jennet Trussell and widower of Alice Vaughn, daughter of Thomas Vaughn.
  - Eleanor Touchet (born circa 1442), who married Humphrey Grey, son of Sir Henry Grey, 2nd Earl of Tankerville and Antigone Plantagenet, in 1460.
  - Anne Touchet (born circa 1446), who married Sir Richard Delabere.

Peerage of England
Preceded by John Tuchet	Baron Tuchet; 1408–1459	Succeeded by John Tuchet
Preceded by John Tuchet	Baron Audley; 1408–1459	Succeeded by John Tuchet
