= Eleanor Cobham =

- Duchess of Gloucester; Countess of Pembroke
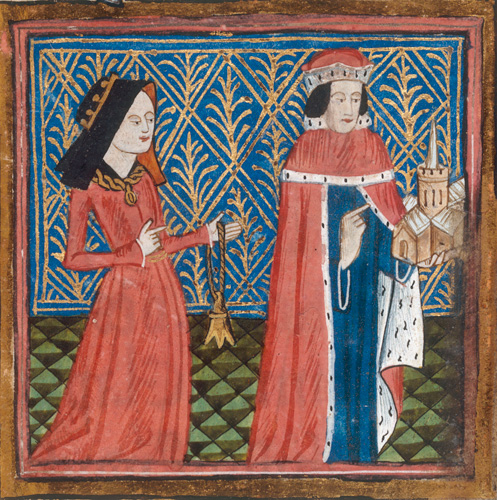
- Eleanor and her husband Humphrey in a 1431 illustration
- Born: c. 1400; Sterborough Castle, Surrey, England
- Died: 7 July 1452 (aged c. 52); Beaumaris Castle, Anglesey, Wales
- Spouse: Humphrey, Duke of Gloucester (m. bet. 1428–1431; ann. c. 1441)
- Father: Sir Reynold Cobham
- Mother: Eleanor Culpeper

Eleanor Cobham (c.1400 – 7 July 1452) was an English noblewoman, first the mistress and then the second wife of Humphrey, Duke of Gloucester. In 1441, she was forcibly divorced and sentenced to life imprisonment for treasonable necromancy, a punishment likely to have been politically motivated.

== Early life ==
Eleanor was the younger daughter of Sir Reynold Cobham (d. 1445), who lived at Sterborough in Surrey, and his first wife, Eleanor Culpeper (d. 1422), daughter of Sir Thomas Culpeper.

== Mistress and wife to the Duke of Gloucester ==
In about 1422, Eleanor became a lady-in-waiting to Jacqueline d'Hainault, who had fled to England in 1421 and divorced her husband, John IV, Duke of Brabant. In 1423, Jacqueline married Humphrey, Duke of Gloucester, the youngest son of King Henry IV, who since the death of his elder brother King Henry V was Lord Protector of the child king Henry VI and a leading member of his council. Jacqueline's divorce was only valid in England, and the marriage to Gloucester was arranged in haste and secret, but in 1424, Gloucester went to France to wrest control of his wife's estates in Hainault.

On his return to England in 1425, Eleanor accompanied Gloucester as his mistress. In January 1428, the Duke's marriage to Jacqueline was annulled, as Pope Martin V decreed that Jacqueline was still the wife of John IV, Duke of Brabant when she had remarried. Gloucester was then free to marry, and married Eleanor. Over the next few years, the couple were the centre of a small but flamboyant court based at their principal residence La Plesaunce in Greenwich, surrounded by poets, musicians, scholars, physicians, friends and acolytes.

In 1435, Gloucester's elder brother John, Duke of Bedford, died, making Humphrey heir presumptive to the English throne. Gloucester also claimed the role of regent, hitherto occupied by his brother, but was opposed in that endeavour by the council. His wife Eleanor had some influence at court and seems to have been liked by Henry VI. In November 1435, Gloucester placed his whole estate in a jointure with Eleanor. Six months later, in April 1436, she was granted the robes of a duchess for the Garter ceremony.

== Trial and imprisonment ==
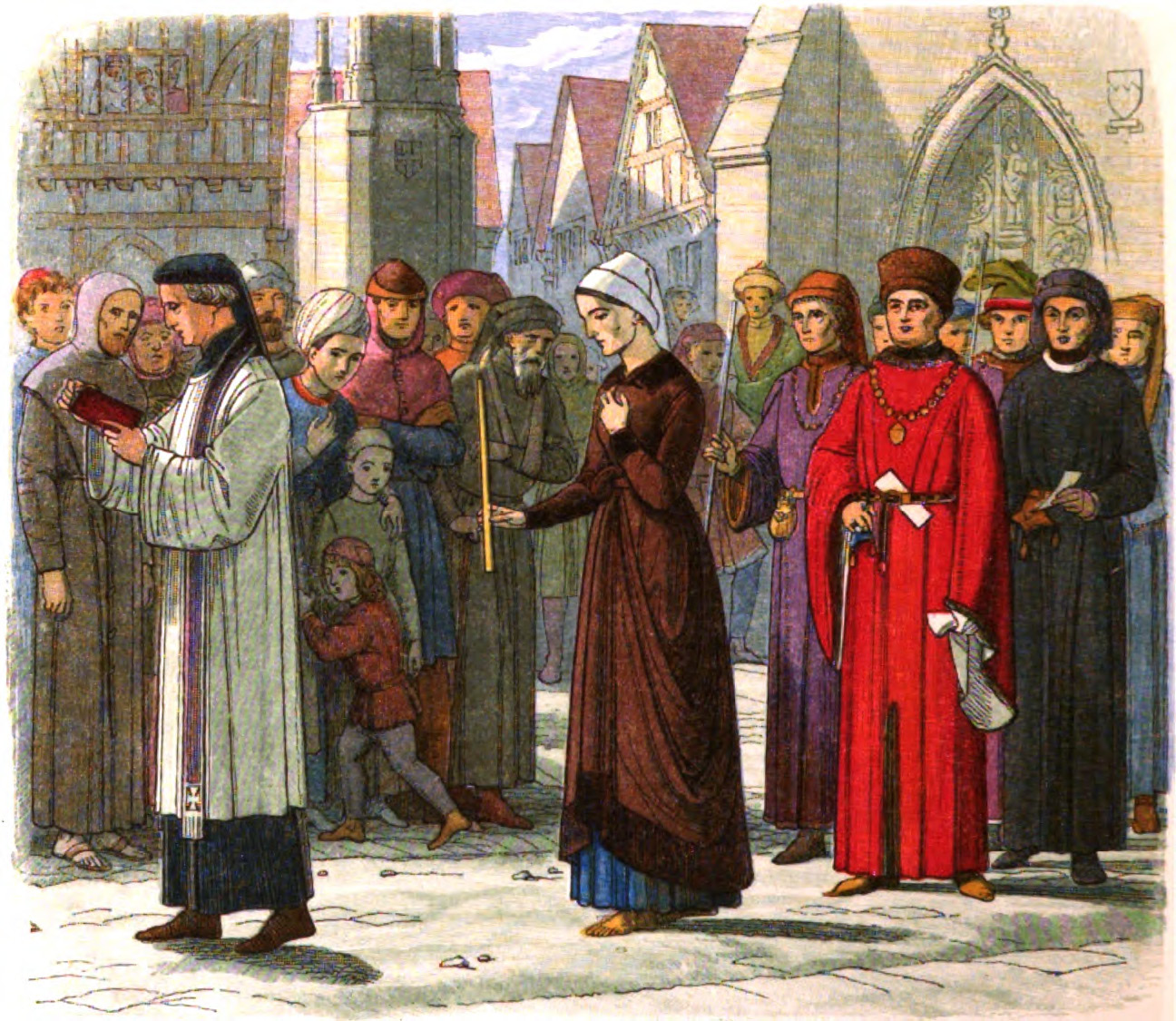
The public penance of Eleanor Cobham from A Chronicle of England illustrated by J. W. E. Doyle 1864.

Eleanor consulted astrologers to try to divine her future, and therefore the royal succession, through her horoscope. The astrologers were Thomas Southwell (physician and canon of St Stephen's Chapel in the palace of Westminster) and Roger Bolingbroke (an Oxford scholar and member of Duke Humphrey's household). They predicted that Henry VI would suffer a life-threatening illness in July or August 1441. When rumours of the prediction reached the king's guardians, they consulted other astrologers, who could find no such future illness in their astrological predictions. This was a comfort for the king, who had been troubled by the rumours. They also followed the rumours to their source and interrogated Southwell, Bolingbroke, and John Home (Eleanor's personal confessor and canon of Hereford and St Asaph). Southwell and Bolingbroke were then arrested on charges of treasonable necromancy. Bolingbroke named Eleanor as the instigator by saying that she had ‘first stirrd himme’ to know ‘to what astate she sholde come.’ She had fled to sanctuary in Westminster Abbey, and so could not be tried by the law courts.

The case against Eleanor was pursued by Humphrey's half-uncle and political rival, Cardinal Henry Beaufort. She faced eighteen charges of necromancy, heresy and witchcraft, among them commissioning a horoscope to foretell the king's death and making a wax image of the king to do him harm.

Eleanor, subject only to the ecclesiastical jurisdiction whilst in sanctuary, was examined by a panel of bishops headed by Henry Chichele, Archbishop of Canterbury. She denied most of the charges of witchcraft, heresy and treason. She confessed to obtaining potions from Margery Jourdemayne, "the Witch of Eye", explaining that they were potions to help her conceive and ‘forto have borne a child by hir lord, the duke of Gloucestre’.

Eleanor and her fellow conspirators were found guilty. Southwell died in the Tower of London, Bolingbroke was hanged, drawn and quartered, and Jourdemayne was burnt at the stake as a relapsed heretic. Eleanor had to do public penance in London, was divorced from her husband, and was condemned to life imprisonment with appropriate accommodation in the royal castles and a royal pension of 100 marks a year.

On each of three market days in November 1441, she was forced to walk barefoot to a different church carrying a taper. Market days were chosen as they were busy, to maximize the humiliation. The bishops found that Eleanor had also used witchcraft to "enforce" Gloucester "to loue her and to wedde her". Therefore her marriage to Duke Humphrey was dissolved through an imposed divorce. This stripped her of her titles and rights to any of the duke's wealth.

A sentence of perpetual imprisonment was imposed. In 1442, Eleanor was imprisoned at Chester Castle, then in 1443 moved to Kenilworth Castle. This move may have been prompted by fears that Eleanor was gaining sympathy amongst the Commons, for just a few months prior an unnamed Kentish woman had met with Henry VI at Blackheath and scolded him for his treatment of Eleanor, saying he should bring her home to her husband. The woman was punished by execution. In July 1446, Eleanor was moved to the Isle of Man, and finally in March 1449 to Beaumaris Castle in Anglesey, where she died on 7 July 1452.

== Historiography ==
Many historians regard the charges as politically motivated, aimed at weakening Duke Humphrey through his wife. Gemma Hollman has noted that consulting astrologers was not unusual even among royalty, and that seeking fertility remedies would not have set Eleanor apart from other women in her position. Euan Roger, a historian at The National Archives, has described the allegations as a smear campaign. He argues that the evidence rested largely on Bolingbroke's confession, which was probably extracted under torture. Ralph A. Griffiths attributed her downfall to the combination of her interest in the occult with political ambition.

== Legacy and depictions ==
Because the trial of a noblewoman for treasonable sorcery was unprecedented, it required new legal provisions, which were later invoked against Anne Boleyn. The scandal discredited Humphrey and weakened the House of Lancaster, and has been seen as one of the developments that opened the way to the Wars of the Roses.

Eleanor appears in Shakespeare's Henry VI, Part 2, where she urges Humphrey to seek the crown and watches as spirits are conjured in Act I, Scene 4. Her public penance is the subject of Edwin Austin Abbey's painting The Penance of Eleanor, Duchess of Gloucester (1900). Philippa Gregory's novel Royal Witch (HarperCollins) tells her story in the first person and, unlike most historical accounts, portrays her as a genuine practitioner of witchcraft.

== Children ==
Eleanor's husband Humphrey had two known children, Arthur and Antigone. Sources are divided about whether they were born to Eleanor before the marriage, or were the offspring of an "unknown mistress or mistresses". Kenneth Hotham Vickers, Alison Weir and Cathy Hartley all suggest that Eleanor was their mother, though other authors treat their maternity as unknown. Antigone, however, had her first child in November 1436 suggesting she was born at the very latest in 1424, which may suggest that she was born before Eleanor became involved with Humphrey. Thus, Eleanor's children may have been:

- Arthur Plantagenet (died after 1447)
- Antigone Plantagenet, who married Henry Grey, 2nd Earl of Tankerville, Lord of Powys (c. 1419–1450) and then John d'Amancier.

== Sources ==
- Du Fresne, Gaston Louis Emmanuel, Marquis de Beaucourt (1881). Histoire de Charles VII (6 vols). Vol. 5. Paris. p. 331.
- Harriss, G. L. (January 2008) [2004]. "Eleanor [née Eleanor Cobham], duchess of Gloucester (c. 1400–1452)". Oxford Dictionary of National Biography (online ed.). Oxford University Press. doi:10.1093/ref:odnb/5742.
- Hollman, Gemma (2019). Royal Witches: From Joan of Navarre to Elizabeth Woodville. Cheltenham: The History Press. ISBN 978-0-7509-8940-4. ISBN 9780750989404.
- Lewis, C. P.; Thacker, A.T., eds. (2003). "The City of Chester: General History and Topography". Later medieval Chester 1230-1550: City and crown, 1350-1550', A History of the County of Chester. Vol. 5, part 1. pp. 55–58.
- Richardson, Douglas (2005). Magna Carta ancestry. Genealogical Publishing. pp. 492, 493.
- Weir, Alison (1999). Britain's Royal Family: A Complete Genealogy. London: The Bodley Head. ISBN 978-0-09-953973-5.
