= Battle of Blore Heath =

1459 battle in the War of the Roses

Coordinates: 52°54′49″N 02°25′29″W

- Part of the Wars of the Roses
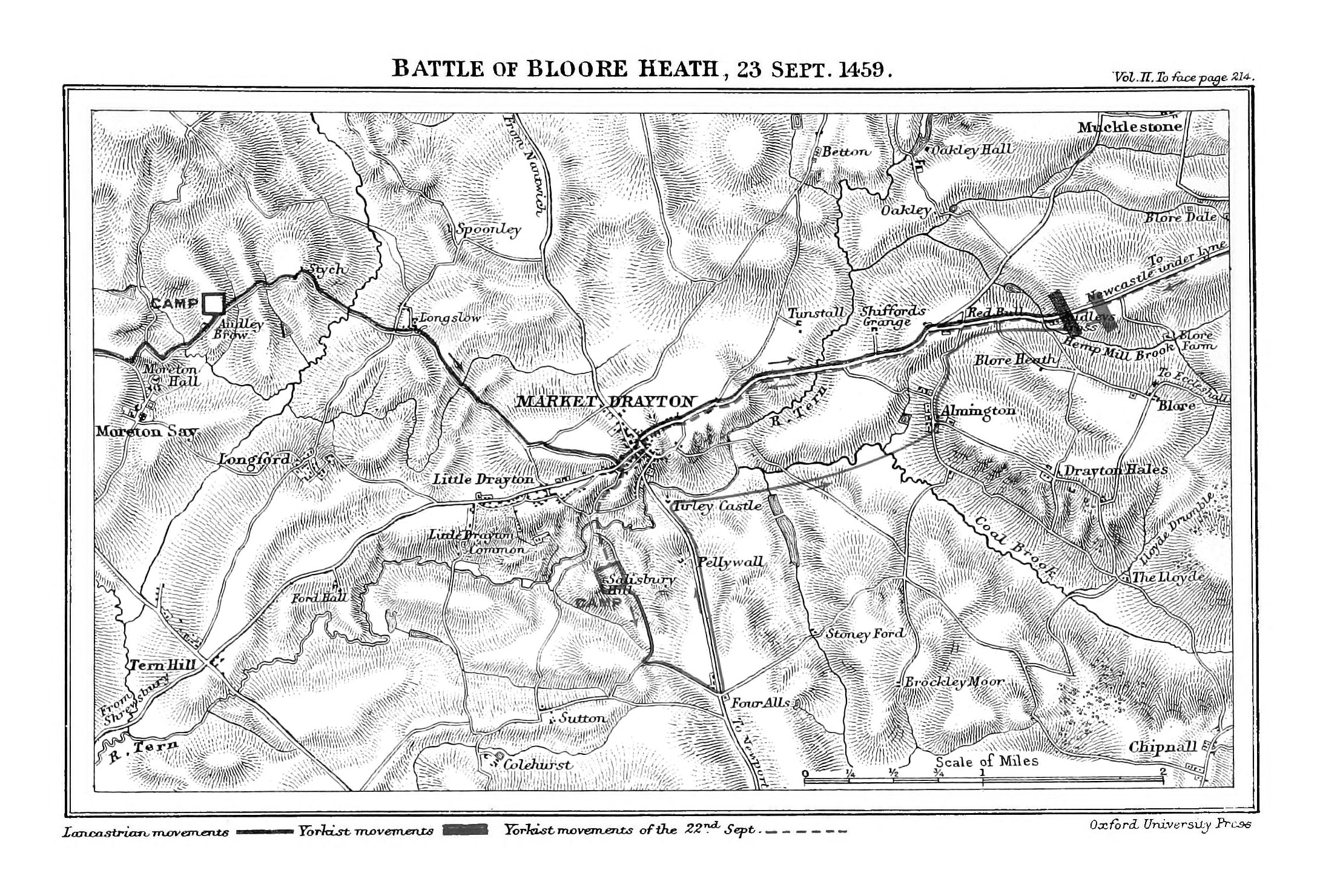
- Map of the battle by James Henry Ramsay (1892)
Date	23 September 1459
Location	Blore Heath, Staffordshire, England
Result	Yorkist victory

Belligerents
House of York	House of Lancaster

Commanders and leaders
Earl of Salisbury; Sir Thomas Neville; Sir John Neville	Baron Audley †; Baron Dudley (surrendered)

Strength
5,000	10,000

Casualties and losses
1,000	2,000

The Battle of Blore Heath took place during the English Wars of the Roses on 23 September 1459, at Blore Heath, Staffordshire. Blore Heath is a sparsely populated area of farmland two miles east of the town of Market Drayton in Shropshire, and close to the village of Loggerheads, Staffordshire.

== Background ==
After the First Battle of St Albans in 1455, an uneasy peace held in England. Attempts at reconciliation between the houses of Lancaster and York enjoyed marginal success. However, both sides became increasingly wary of each other and by 1459 were actively recruiting armed supporters. Queen Margaret of Anjou continued to raise support for King Henry VI amongst noblemen, distributing an emblem of a silver swan to knights and squires enlisted by her personally, whilst the Yorkist command under the Duke of York was finding plenty of anti-royal support despite the severe punishment for raising arms against the king.

The Yorkist force based at Middleham Castle, Yorkshire (led by the Earl of Salisbury) needed to link up with the main Yorkist army at Ludlow Castle in Shropshire. As Salisbury marched south-west through the Midlands, the queen ordered Lord Audley to intercept them.

== Battle ==
Audley chose the barren heathland of Blore Heath to set up an ambush. On the morning of 23 September 1459 (Saint Thecla's day), a force of some 10,000 men took up a defensive position behind a 'great hedge' on the south-western edge of Blore Heath facing the direction of Newcastle-under-Lyme to the north-east, the direction from which Salisbury was approaching.

Yorkist scouts spotted Lancastrian banners over the top of a hedge and immediately warned Salisbury. As they emerged from the woodland, the Yorkist force of some 5,000 men realized that a much larger enemy force was awaiting their arrival. Salisbury, instead of disbanding or withdrawing his army, immediately arranged his troops into battle order, just out of range of the Lancastrian archers. To secure his right flank, he arranged the supply wagons in a defensive laager, a circular formation to provide cover to the men. Fearing a rout, Yorkist soldiers are reported to have kissed the ground beneath them, supposing that this would be the ground on which they would meet their deaths.

The two armies were separated by about 300 metres on the barren heathland. A steep-sided, wide and fast-flowing brook ran between them. The brook made Audley's position seemingly impenetrable.

Initially, both leaders attempted to parley in an attempt to avoid bloodshed. In keeping with many late medieval battles, the conflict opened with an archery duel between the longbows of both armies. At Blore Heath, that proved inconclusive because of the distance between the two sides.

Salisbury, aware that any attack across the brook would be suicidal, employed a ruse to encourage the enemy to attack him. He withdrew some of his middle-order just far enough that the Lancastrians believed them to be retreating. The Lancastrians launched a cavalry charge. After they had committed themselves, Salisbury ordered his men to turn back and catch the Lancastrians as they attempted to cross the brook. It is possible that the order for the Lancastrian charge was not given by Audley, but it had the effect of turning the balance in favour of Salisbury. The charge resulted in heavy casualties for the Lancastrians.

The Lancastrians withdrew and then made a second assault possibly in an attempt to rescue casualties. The second attack was more successful with many Lancastrians crossing the brook. That led to a period of intense fighting in which Audley himself was killed, possibly by Sir Roger Kynaston of Myddle and Hordley.

The Earl of Salisbury, which knew the sleights, strategies and policies of warlike affairs, suddenly returned, and shortly encountered with the Lord Audley and his chief captains, ere the residue of his army could pass the water. The fight was sore and dreadful. The earl desiring the saving of his life, and his adversaries coveting his destruction, fought sore for the obtaining of their purpose, but in conclusion, the earl's army, as men desperate of aid and succour, so eagerly fought, that they slew the Lord Audley, and all his captains, and discomfited all the remnant of his people...

The death of Audley meant that Lancastrian command fell to the second-in-command, Lord Dudley, who ordered an attack on foot with some 4,000 men. As this attack also failed, some 500 Lancastrians joined the enemy and began attacking their own side. At this point, all remaining Lancastrian resistance collapsed, and the Yorkists had only to advance to complete the rout.

The rout continued through the night, with the Yorkists pursuing the fleeing enemy for miles across the countryside.

At least 2,000 Lancastrians were killed, with the Yorkists losing nearly 1,000.

== Aftermath ==
Salisbury was concerned that Lancastrian reinforcements were in the vicinity and was keen to press on southwards towards Ludlow. He made his camp on a hillside by Market Drayton that later took the name Salisbury Hill. According to Gregory's Chronicle, Salisbury employed a local friar to remain on Blore Heath throughout the night and to periodically discharge a cannon to deceive any Lancastrians nearby into believing that the fight was continuing.

Audley is buried in Darley Abbey, Derbyshire.

== Commemorations ==
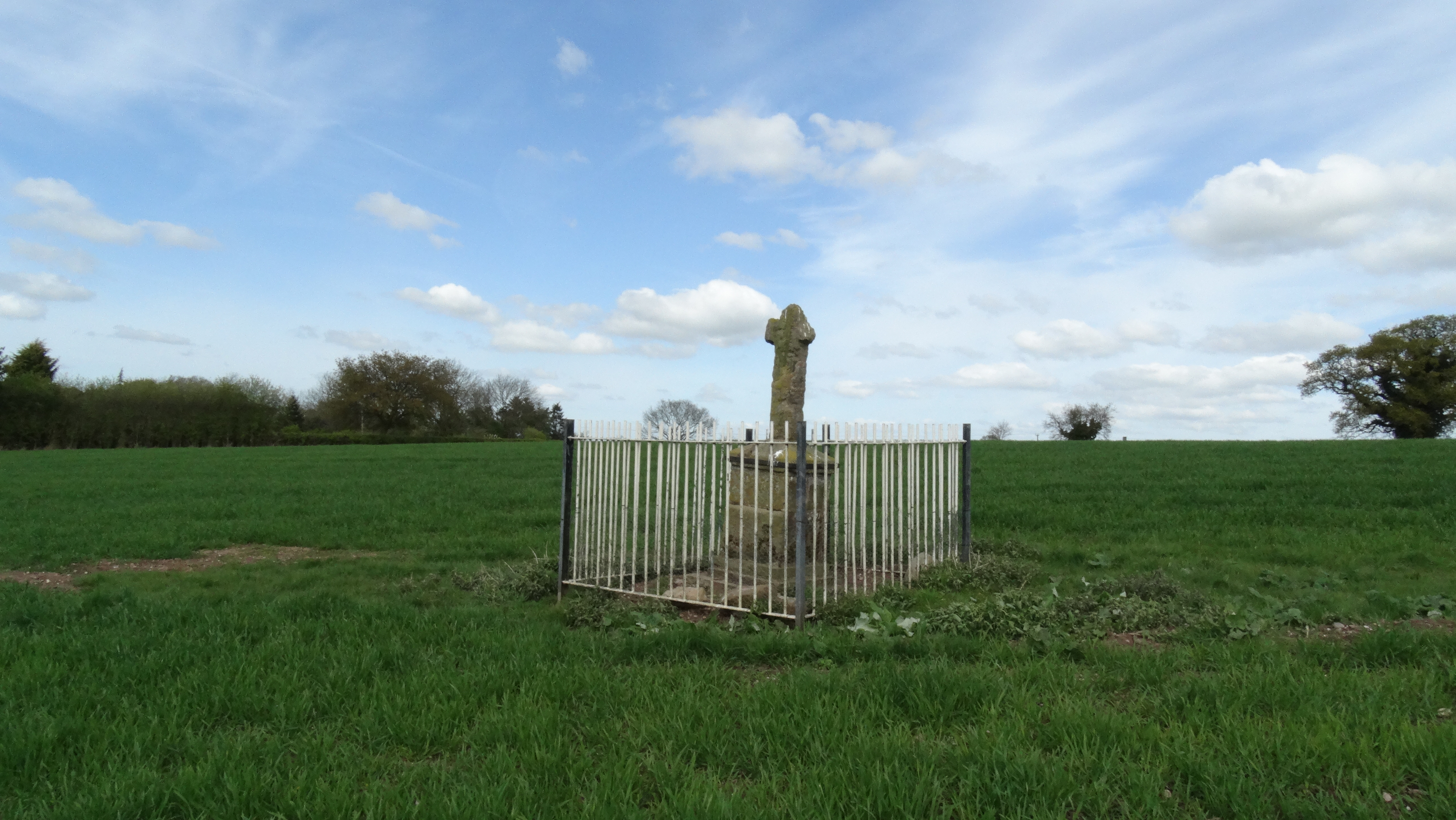
Audley's Cross

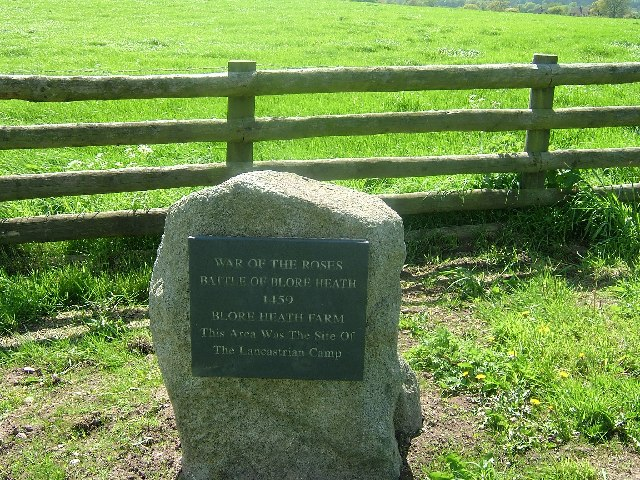
Plaque on commemorative stone

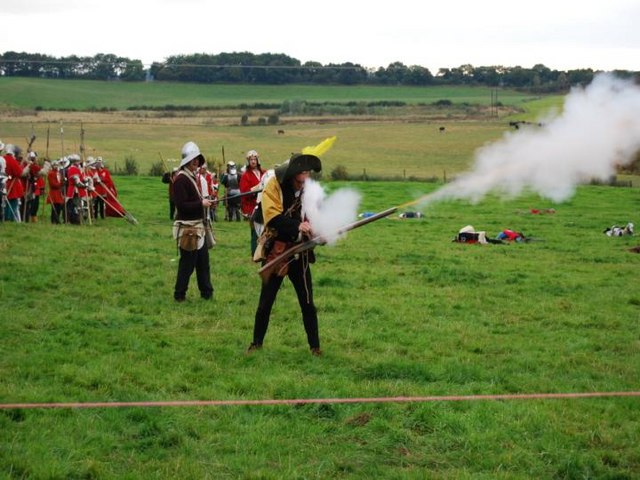
Re-enactors of the battle in 2007

Audley's Cross was erected at Blore Heath after the battle to mark the spot where Audley was slain. It was replaced with a stone cross in 1765.

The battle was commemorated by a re-enactment each year in September at Blore Heath until 2010.

== See also ==
- Military history of Britain

== Bibliography ==
- Anthony Goodman, The Wars of the Roses: Military Activity and English Society, 1452–97, Routledge & Kegan Paul, 1981.
- Ralph A. Griffiths, The Reign of King Henry VI, University of California Press, 1981.
- Edward Hall, The Union of The Noble and Illustre Famelies of Lancastre & Yorke, 1548.
- Michael Hicks, The Wars of the Roses, Yale University Press, 2010.
- The Blore Heath Heritage Group (BHHG).
- Trevor Royle, Lancaster Against York: The Wars of the Roses and the Foundation of Modern Britain, Palgrave Macmillan, 2008.
- A Global Chronology of Conflict: From the Ancient World to the Modern Middle East, Vol. II, ed. Spencer C. Tucker, ABC-CLIO, 2010.
- Bertram Wolffe, Henry VI, St. Edmundsbury Press, 2001.
- John Gillingham, The Wars of the Roses: Peace and Conflict in Fifteenth Century England, Phoenix Press, 2001.
