= Humphrey, Duke of Gloucester =

Lord Protector of England from 1422 to 1437

Humphrey of Lancaster
- Duke of Gloucester
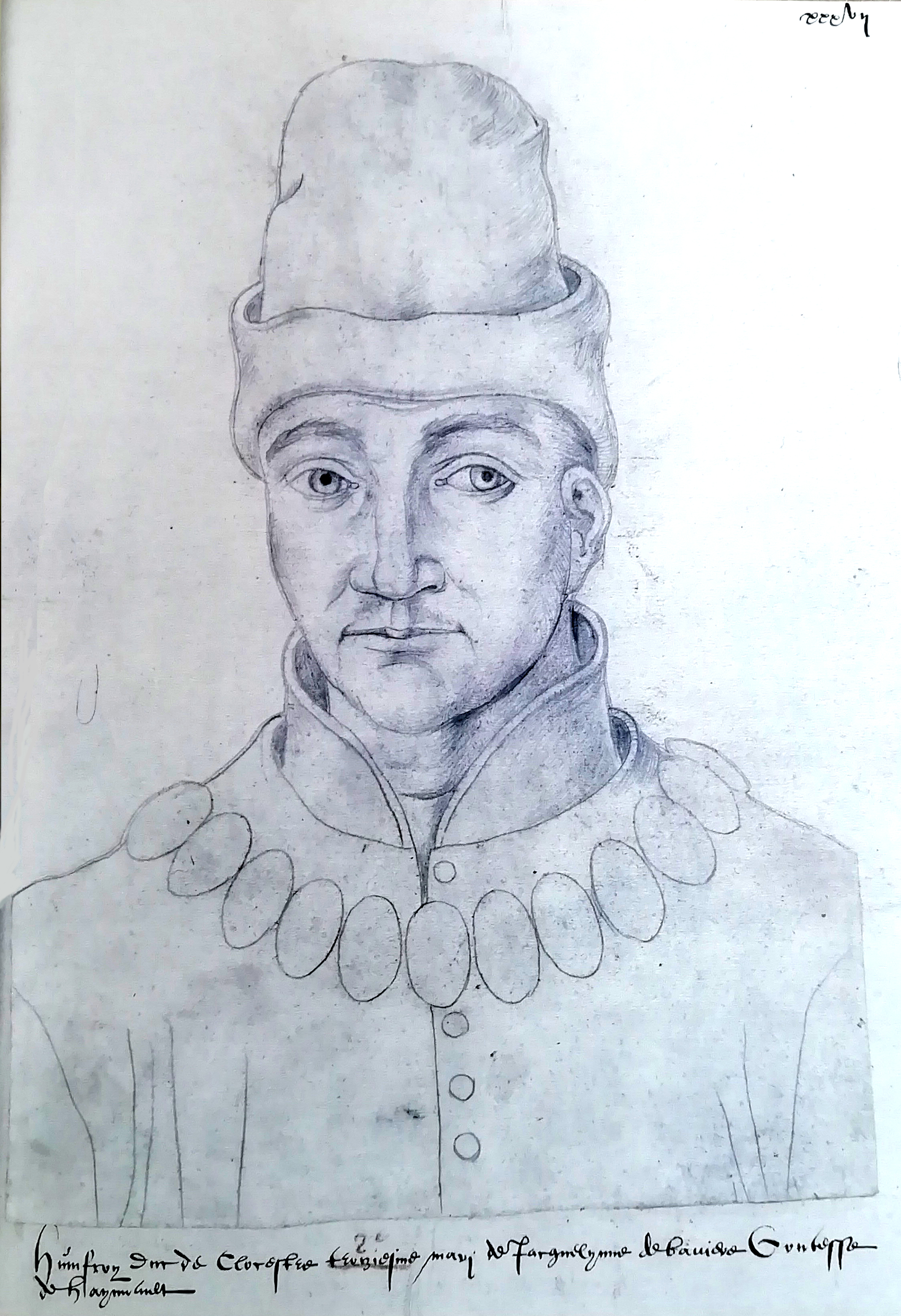
- c. 16th-century drawing based on contemporary portrait (from the Recueil d'Arras)
- Born: 3 October 1390
- Died: 23 February 1447 (aged 56); Bury St Edmunds, Suffolk
- Burial: 4 March 1447; St Albans Abbey
- Spouse: Jacqueline of Hainaut (m. 1422; ann. 1428) Eleanor Cobham (m. 1428; ann. 1441)
- Issue: Arthur of Gloucester (illegitimate); Antigone, Countess of Tankerville (illegitimate)
- House: Lancaster
- Father: Henry IV of England
- Mother: Mary de Bohun

Coat of arms of Humphrey of Lancaster, 1st Duke of Gloucester: Arms of King Henry IV differenced by a bordure argent

Humphrey of Lancaster, Duke of Gloucester (3 October 1390 – 23 February 1447) was an English prince, soldier and literary patron. He was, and styled himself as, "son, brother and uncle of kings", being the fourth and youngest son of Henry IV of England, the brother of Henry V, and the uncle of Henry VI. Gloucester fought in the Hundred Years' War and acted as Lord Protector of England during the minority of his nephew. He was a controversial political figure whose actions and policies generated both support and opposition among his contemporaries and later historians. Assessments of his career note his involvement in political conflicts as well as his engagement with intellectual circles, including his role as an early English patron of humanist scholarship, in the context of the Renaissance.

Unlike his brothers, Humphrey was given no major military command by his father, instead receiving an intellectual upbringing. Created Duke of Gloucester in 1414, he participated in Henry V's campaigns during the Hundred Years' War in France: he fought at Agincourt in 1415 and at the conquest of Normandy in 1417–9. Following the king's death in 1422, Gloucester, as Lord Protector, became one of the leading figures during the minority of Henry VI. He proved a rash, impulsive, unscrupulous and troublesome figure, he quarrelled constantly with his brother, John, Duke of Bedford and uncle, Cardinal Henry Beaufort and went so far as to violently prosecute a dispute with the Duke of Burgundy, a key English ally in France, over conflicting claims to lands in the Low Countries.

Humphrey was associated with contemporary ideals of chivalry and was regarded by some as embodying aspects of that tradition. His marriage to Jacqueline, Countess of Hainaut, played a significant role in his political and military activities in the Low Countries. His learned, widely read, scholarly approach to the early renaissance cultural expansion demonstrated the quintessential well-rounded princely character. He was a paragon for Eton College and an exemplar for the University of Oxford, accomplished, diplomatic, with political cunning. Despite the errors in his public and private life and the mischief he caused in politics, Gloucester is also at times praised as a patron of learning and a benefactor to the University of Oxford. He was popular among the literary figures of his age for his scholarly activity and with the common people for his advocacy of a spirited foreign policy. For these causes, he was known as the "good Duke Humphrey".

Gloucester never fully achieved his desired dominance in England, and his attempts to gain a foreign principality for himself were fruitless. A staunch opponent of concessions in the French conflict and a proponent of offensive warfare, Gloucester gradually lost favour among the political community, and King Henry VI after the end of his minority, following defeats in France. The trial in 1441 of Eleanor Cobham, his second wife, under charges of witchcraft, destroyed Gloucester's political influence. In 1447, he was accused, probably falsely, of treason and died a few days later while under arrest.

== Childhood and early career ==
The place of Humphrey's birth is unknown, but he was named after his maternal grandfather, Humphrey de Bohun, 7th Earl of Hereford. He was the youngest in a powerful quadrumvirate of brothers, who were very close companions; on 20 March 1413, Henry and Humphrey had been at their dying father's bedside. Thomas, John and Humphrey had all been knighted in 1399. They joined the Order of the Garter together in 1400.

During the reign of Henry IV, Humphrey received a scholar's education, possibly at Balliol College, Oxford, while his elder brothers fought on the Welsh and Scottish borders. Following his father's death he was created Duke of Gloucester in 1414, and Chamberlain of England, and he took his seat in Parliament. He became a member of the Privy Council in 1415.

== Diplomatic and military career ==
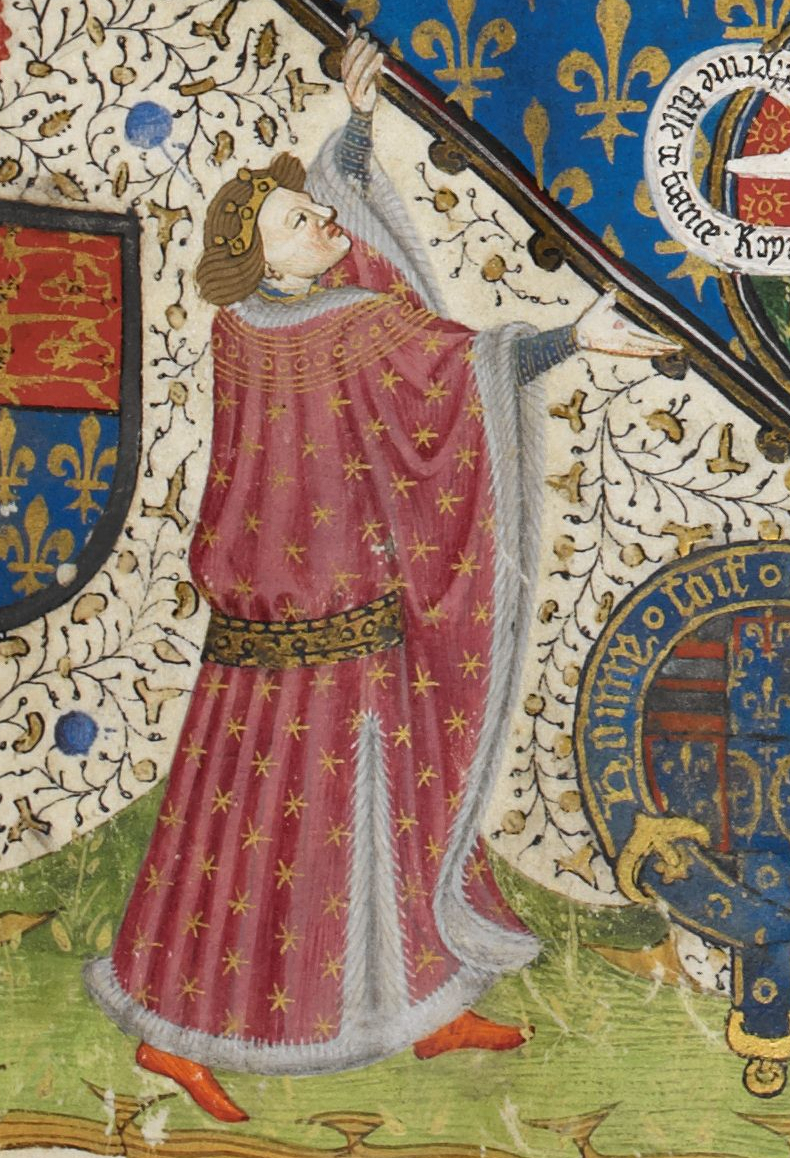
Gloucester in the frontispiece of the Talbot Shrewsbury Book, 1445

He joined Henry V's campaigns in France. Before embarking, the army camped at Southampton, where the Earl of Cambridge failed in the Southampton Plot, which was an assassination plot against the king. Humphrey and his brother, the Duke of Clarence, led an Inquiry of Lords to try Cambridge and Scrope for high treason on 5 August.

During the campaign, Humphrey gained a reputation as a commander. His knowledge of siege warfare, gained from his classical studies, contributed to the fall of Honfleur. During the Battle of Agincourt Humphrey was wounded; as he fell, the king sheltered him and withstood a determined assault from French knights. For his services, Humphrey was granted offices including Constable of Dover, Warden of the Cinque Ports on 27 November and King's Lieutenant. His tenure in government was peaceful and successful. This period commenced with Emperor Sigismund's peace mission, the only visit of a medieval emperor to England. According to Holinshed's Chronicles, Humphrey was the principal actor in a symbolic ceremony. He welcomed the emperor on the shoreline with a sword in his hand, "extorting" from Sigismund the renunciation of his prerogatives of dominion over the king of England before allowing him to land on the evening of 1 May 1416. The Treaty of "eternal friendship" signed at Canterbury on 15 August served only to anticipate renewed hostility from France.

Upon the death of his brother in 1422, Humphrey became Lord Protector to his young nephew Henry VI, then a baby. He also claimed the right to the regency of England following the death of his elder brother, John, Duke of Bedford, in 1435. Humphrey's claims were strongly contested by the lords of the king's council and in particular his half-uncle, Cardinal Henry Beaufort. Henry V's will, rediscovered at Eton College in 1978, actually supported Humphrey's claims. In 1436 Philip, Duke of Burgundy, attacked Calais. Duke Humphrey was appointed garrison commander. The Flemings assaulted from the landward but the English resistance was stubborn. Humphrey marched the army to Baillieul, taking the English to safety; he threatened St. Omer before sailing home.

Humphrey was consistently popular with the citizens of London and the Commons. He also had a widespread reputation as a patron of learning and the arts. His popularity with the people and his ability to keep the peace earned him the appointment of Chief Justice of South Wales. His unpopular marriage to Eleanor Cobham became ammunition for his enemies. Eleanor was arrested and tried for sorcery and heresy in 1441 and Humphrey retired from public life. He was arrested on a charge of treason on 20 February 1447 and died at Bury St Edmunds in Suffolk three days later. He was buried at St Albans Abbey, adjacent to St Alban's shrine. Some suspected that he had been poisoned, though it is more probable that he died of a stroke.

According to Jonathan Sumption, Gloucester's death "was never explained". A contemporary London chronicler wrote: "How he died God knoweth, to whom nothing is hid". "The Duke's health had not been good", and the "shock of arrest might well have provoked a heart attack which killed him." But his death was highly "convenient for the governing clique. It avoided a state trial at which Gloucester, an eloquent man with many friends, would have defended himself with vigour. In the eyes of the public, Gloucester was murdered. The council put his body, apparently uninjured, on public display, but the rumours persisted." Sixty of the Duke's retainers, dependents and household staff were also arrested, with eight of his closest associates being convicted of treason and sentenced to be hanged, drawn and quartered. Although he had been his erstwhile political opponent, the Duke of Suffolk had qualms about what amounted to an "act of judicial murder", and "produced charters of pardon in the middle of the barbarous ceremony just as the executioner was about to eviscerate" five of the eight who had been condemned.

In each subsequent year, a petition was made to Parliament to rehabilitate 'Good Duke Humphrey', and by the end of the century his reputation had been restored.

== Marriages ==
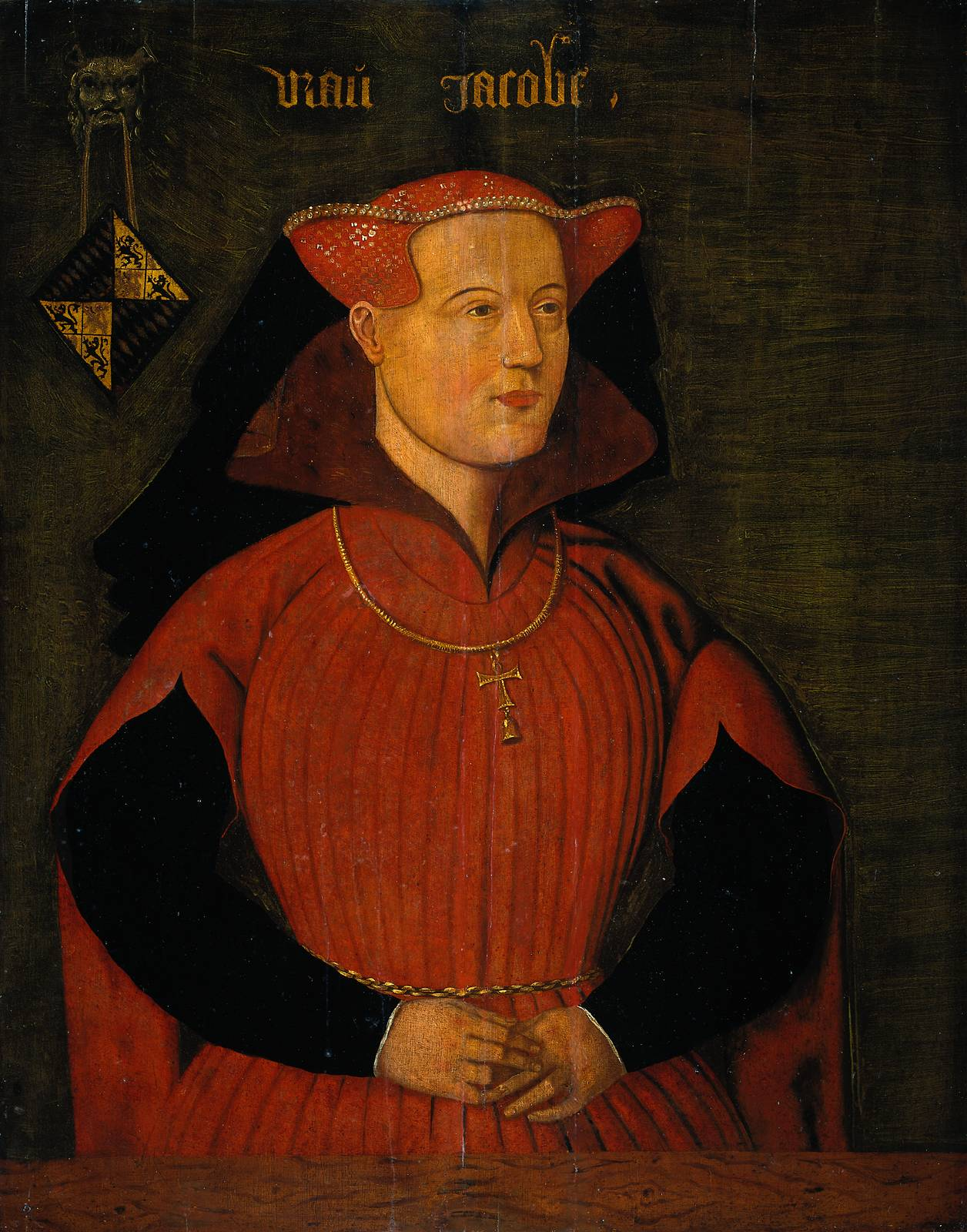
Jacqueline, Countess of Holland and Zeeland, c. 1435

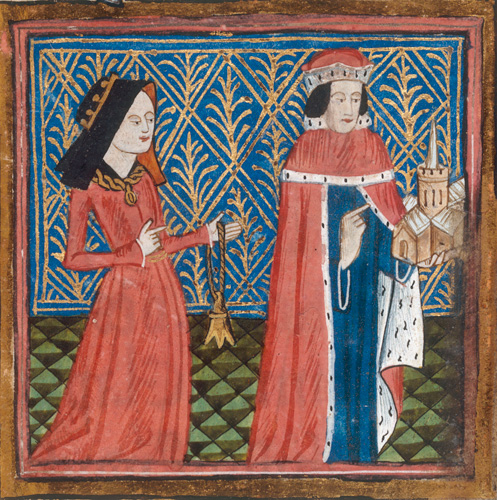
Illuminated miniature of Humphrey and his second wife Eleanor from Thomas Walsingham's Book of Benefactors to St Albans, 1431. Cotton MS Nero D VII, British Library

He married twice but left no surviving legitimate progeny.

=== First marriage: Jacqueline, Countess of Hainaut and Holland ===
In about 1423 he married Jacqueline, Countess of Hainaut and Holland (died 1436), daughter of William VI, Count of Hainaut. Through this marriage Gloucester assumed the title "Count of Holland, Zeeland and Hainault", and briefly fought to retain these titles when they were contested by Jacqueline's cousin Philip the Good (see: War of Succession in Holland). They had a stillborn child in 1424. The marriage was annulled in 1428, and Jacqueline died (disinherited) in 1436.

=== Second marriage: Eleanor Cobham ===
In 1428 Humphrey married, secondly, Eleanor Cobham, his mistress, who in 1441 was tried and convicted of practising witchcraft against the king in an attempt to retain power for her husband. She was condemned to public penance followed by exile and life imprisonment. The marriage was without progeny.

=== Children ===
By mistresses unknown Humphrey had two illegitimate children. Eleanor Cobham was possibly the mother of one or both, before their marriage. Due to their illegitimacy, they were unable to succeed to their father's titles. The illegitimate children were:

- Arthur Plantagenet (died after 1447)
- Antigone Plantagenet, who was born before 1424; married firstly Henry Grey, 2nd Earl of Tankerville, Lord of Powys (c. 1419–1450) and secondly John d'Amancier.

== Legacy ==
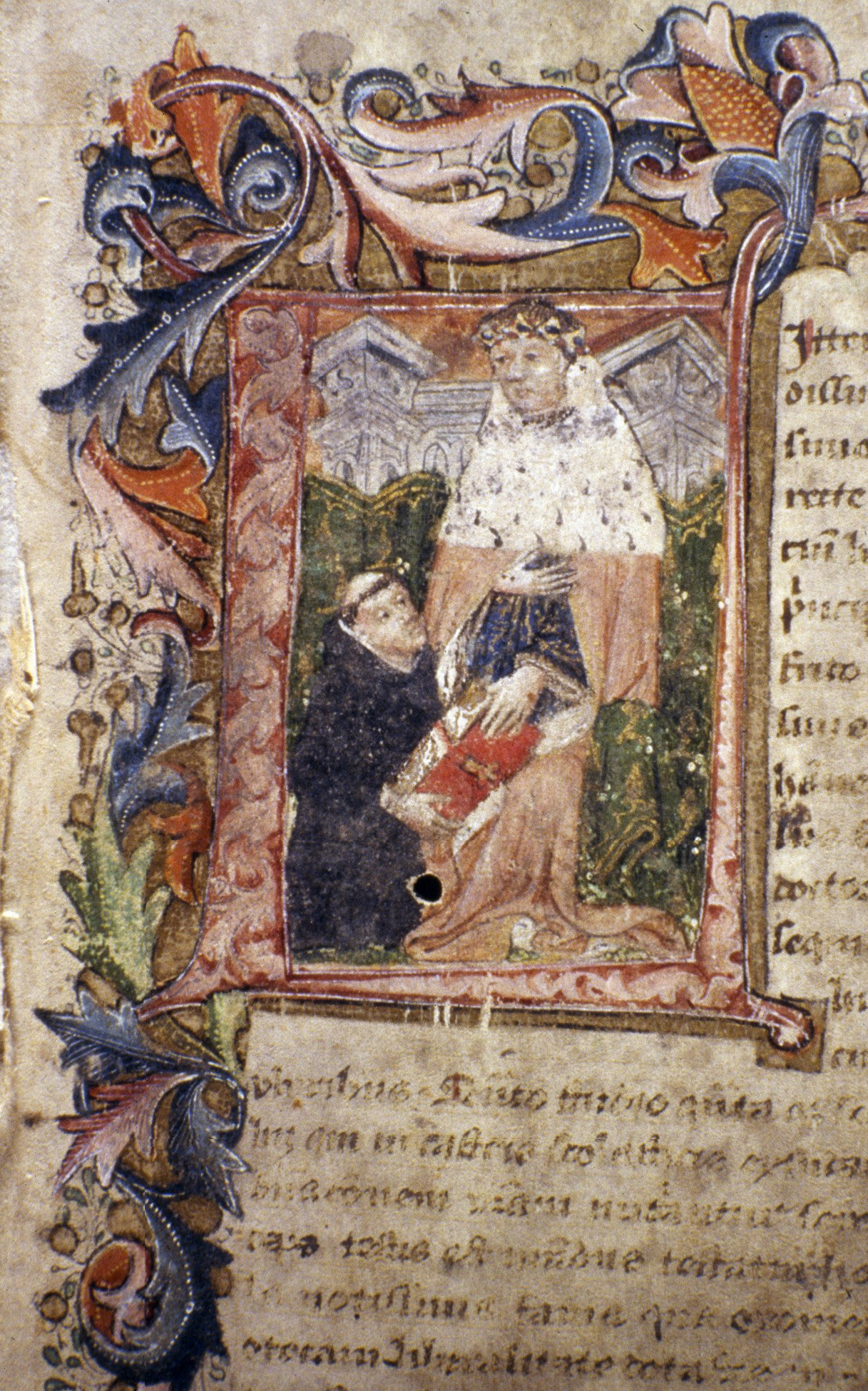
Historiated initial from John Capgrave's Commentary on Exodus (c. 1440) showing Capgrave presenting his book to Gloucester. One of three remaining volumes of Duke Humfrey's Library

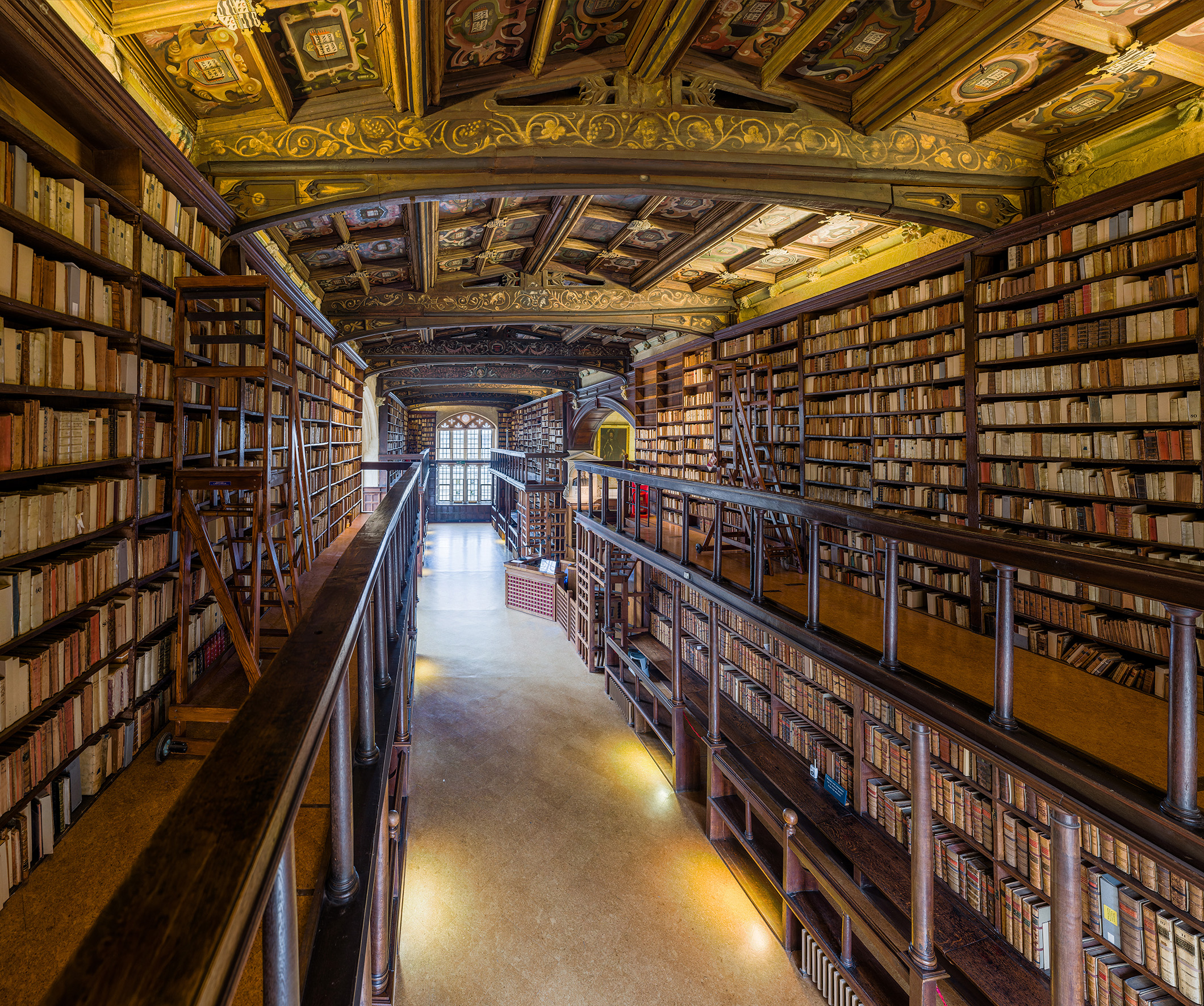
Duke Humfrey's Library in Oxford, part of the Bodleian Library

After inheriting the manor of Greenwich, Gloucester enclosed Greenwich Park and from 1428 had a palace built there on the banks of the Thames, known as Bella Court and later as the Palace of Placentia or La Pleasaunce. The Duke Humphrey Tower surmounting Greenwich Park was demolished in the 1660s and the site was chosen for building the Royal Observatory. His name lives on in Duke Humfrey's Library, part of the Bodleian Library in Oxford University, and in Duke Humphrey Road on Blackheath, south of Greenwich. Duke Humphrey was a patron and protector of Oxford, donating more than 280 manuscripts to the university. The possession of such a library did much to stimulate new learning.

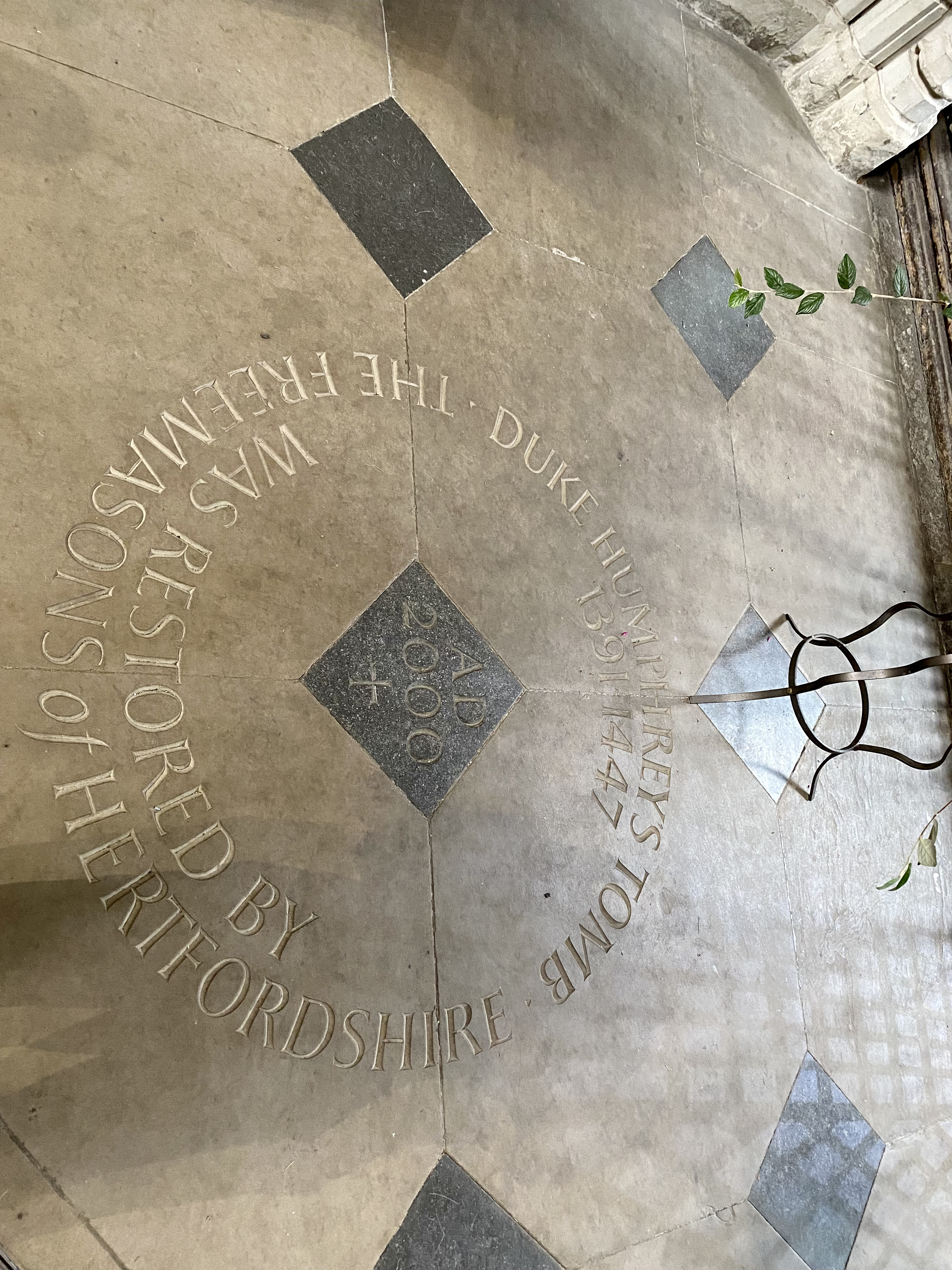
The site of Humphrey's tomb in the Abbey of St Albans

Duke Humphrey was also a patron of literature, notably of the poet John Lydgate and of John Capgrave. He corresponded with many leading Italian humanists and commissioned translations of Greek classics into Latin. His friendship with Zano Castiglione, Bishop of Bayeux, led to many further connections on the Continent, including Leonardo Bruni, Pietro Candido Decembrio and Tito Livio Frulovisi. Duke Humphrey also patronised the Abbey of St Albans.

Together with his second wife, Eleanor, he commissioned a hanap, a drinking goblet, possibly as their wedding cup. This hanap, known as the Wreathen Cup, was used when they hosted dinners at La Pleasance and their London residence, Baynard's Castle. It found its way into the possession of his kinswoman, Lady Margaret Beaufort, who bequeathed it to her confessor, Dr Edmund Wilford, of Oriel College, Oxford. He exchanged it for another piece of silver left by Lady Margaret to her foundation at Christ's College, Cambridge, where it remains. How it reached Lady Margaret is unclear, but a fellow of the college has conjectured that it came through her husband, Thomas Stanley, who had custody of Eleanor during her imprisonment and was involved in liquidating Humphrey's estate.

Duke Humphrey's Walk was the name of an aisle in Old St Paul's Cathedral near to what was popularly believed to be Duke Humphrey's tomb, though, according to W. Carew Hazlitt, it was, in reality, a monument to John Lord Beauchamp de Warwick (died 1360). This was an area frequented by thieves and beggars. The phrase "to dine with Duke Humphrey" was used of poor people who had no money for a meal, in reference to this. Saki updates the phrase by referring to a "Duke Humphrey picnic", one without food, in his short story "The Feast of Nemesis". In fact, Humphrey's tomb is in the Abbey of St Albans (the cathedral): it was restored by Hertfordshire Freemasons in 2000 to celebrate the millennium.

=== In literature ===
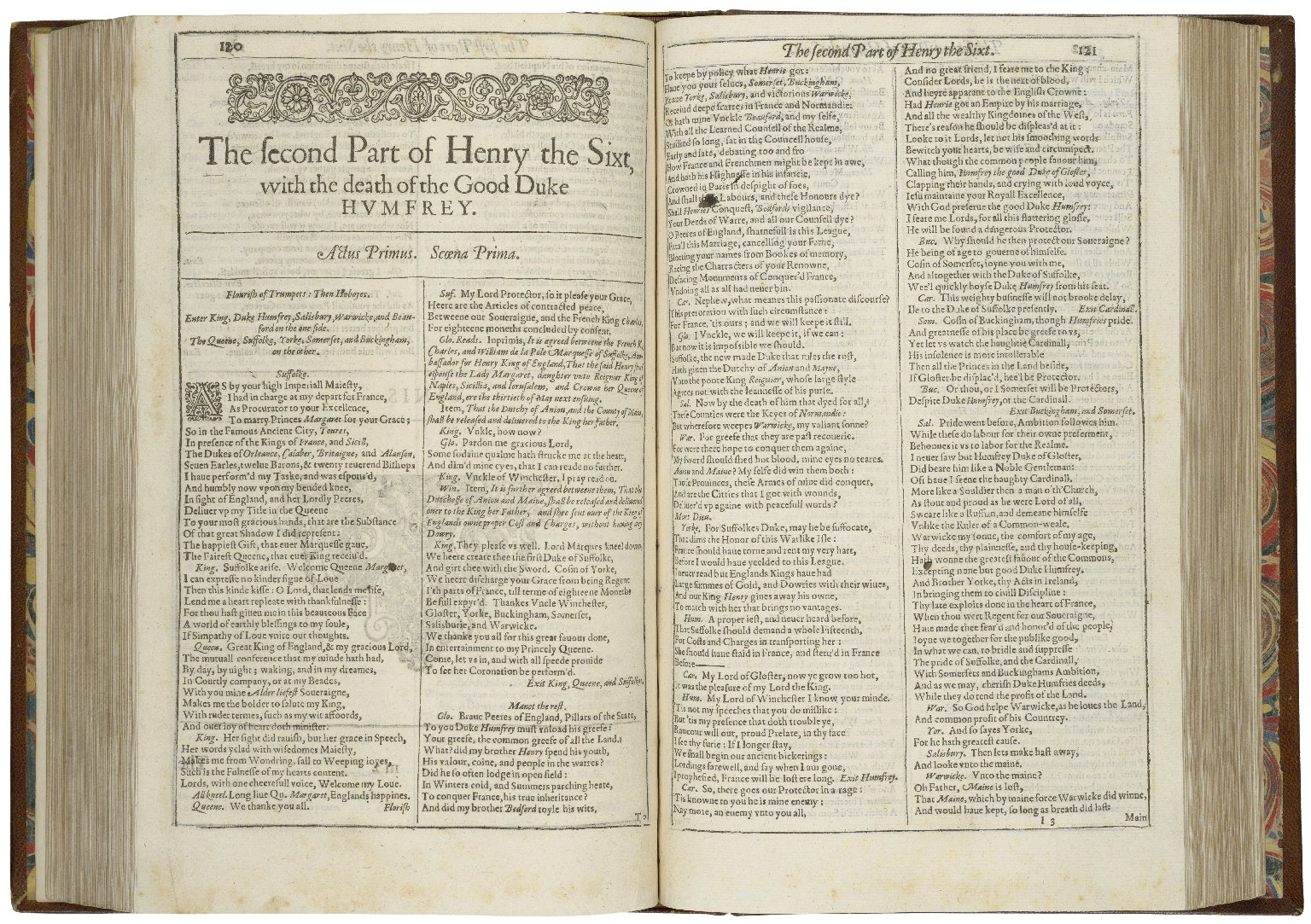
The first page of the First Folio of the plays of William Shakespeare, illustrating Henry VI, Part 2, with a subtitle emphasising Humphrey's death

In Shakespeare's History plays, the portrayal of Humphrey is notable for being one of the most unambiguously sympathetic: in the War of the Roses Tetralogy, he is one of only a handful of historical personages to be portrayed in a uniformly positive light. He appears as a minor character in Henry IV, Part 2 and Henry V, but as a major character in two others: his conflict with Cardinal Beaufort is portrayed in Henry VI, Part 1, and his disgrace and death following his wife's alleged sorcery is depicted in Henry VI, Part 2. Shakespeare portrays Humphrey's death as a murder, ordered by William de la Pole, 1st Duke of Suffolk, and Queen Margaret of Anjou.

The 1723 play Humphrey, Duke of Gloucester by Ambrose Philips revolves around the life of Gloucester. In the original Drury Lane production he was played by Barton Booth.

Margaret Frazer's 2003 historical mystery, The Bastard's Tale, revolves around the events surrounding Gloucester's arrest and death.

== Titles, honours and arms ==
- Duke of Gloucester; created in 1414 (second creation).
- Earl of Pembroke; created in 1414 (fifth creation). The title was subsequently made hereditary, but defaulted to William de la Pole.
- Lord Warden of the Cinque Ports, 1415.

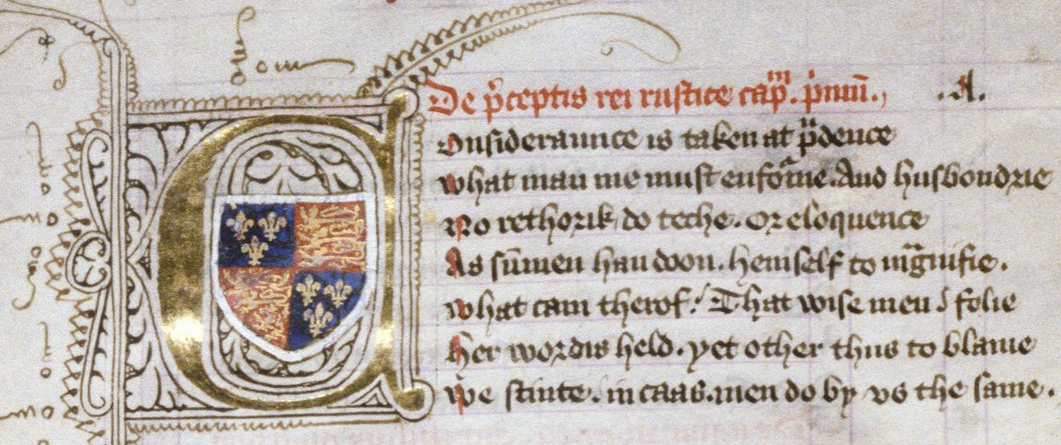
This historiated initial from an illuminated manuscript commissioned by Humphrey shows his arms, the arms of the kingdom, differenced by a bordure argent. MS Humfrey d2, c. 1442, Bodleian Library, Oxford

== Ancestry ==
Ancestors of Humphrey, Duke of Gloucester

8. Edward III of England
4. John of Gaunt, 1st Duke of Lancaster
9. Philippa of Hainault
2. Henry IV of England
10. Henry of Grosmont, 1st Duke of Lancaster
5. Blanche of Lancaster
11. Isabel of Beaumont
1. Humphrey, Duke of Gloucester
12. William de Bohun, 1st Earl of Northampton
6. Humphrey de Bohun, 7th Earl of Hereford
13. Elizabeth de Badlesmere
3. Mary de Bohun
14. Richard Fitzalan, 10th Earl of Arundel
7. Joan Fitzalan
15. Eleanor of Lancaster

Humphrey, Duke of Gloucester House of Lancaster Cadet branch of the House of Plantagenet Born: 3 October 1390 Died: 23 February 1447
Peerage of England
Vacant New creation Title last held by Thomas of Woodstock	Duke of Gloucester; 16 May 1414 – 23 February 1447	Vacant Extinct Title next held by Richard
Vacant New creation Title last held by John Hastings	Earl of Pembroke; 16 May 1414 – 23 February 1447	Succeeded by William de la Pole
Legal offices
Preceded by Edward, 2nd Duke of York	Justice in eyre south of the Trent; 27 January 1416 – 23 February 1447	Succeeded by Richard of York, 3rd Duke of York
Vacant	Lord Protector of England for Henry VI; 5 December 1422 – 6 November 1429; With: John, Duke of Bedford	Vacant Title next held by Richard of York, 3rd Duke of York
Honorary titles
Preceded by Thomas Fitzalan, 5th Earl of Arundel and Surrey	Lord Warden of the Cinque Ports; 27 November 1415 – 23 February 1447	Succeeded by James Fiennes, 1st Baron Saye and Sele
