= Hen Gwrt Moated Site =

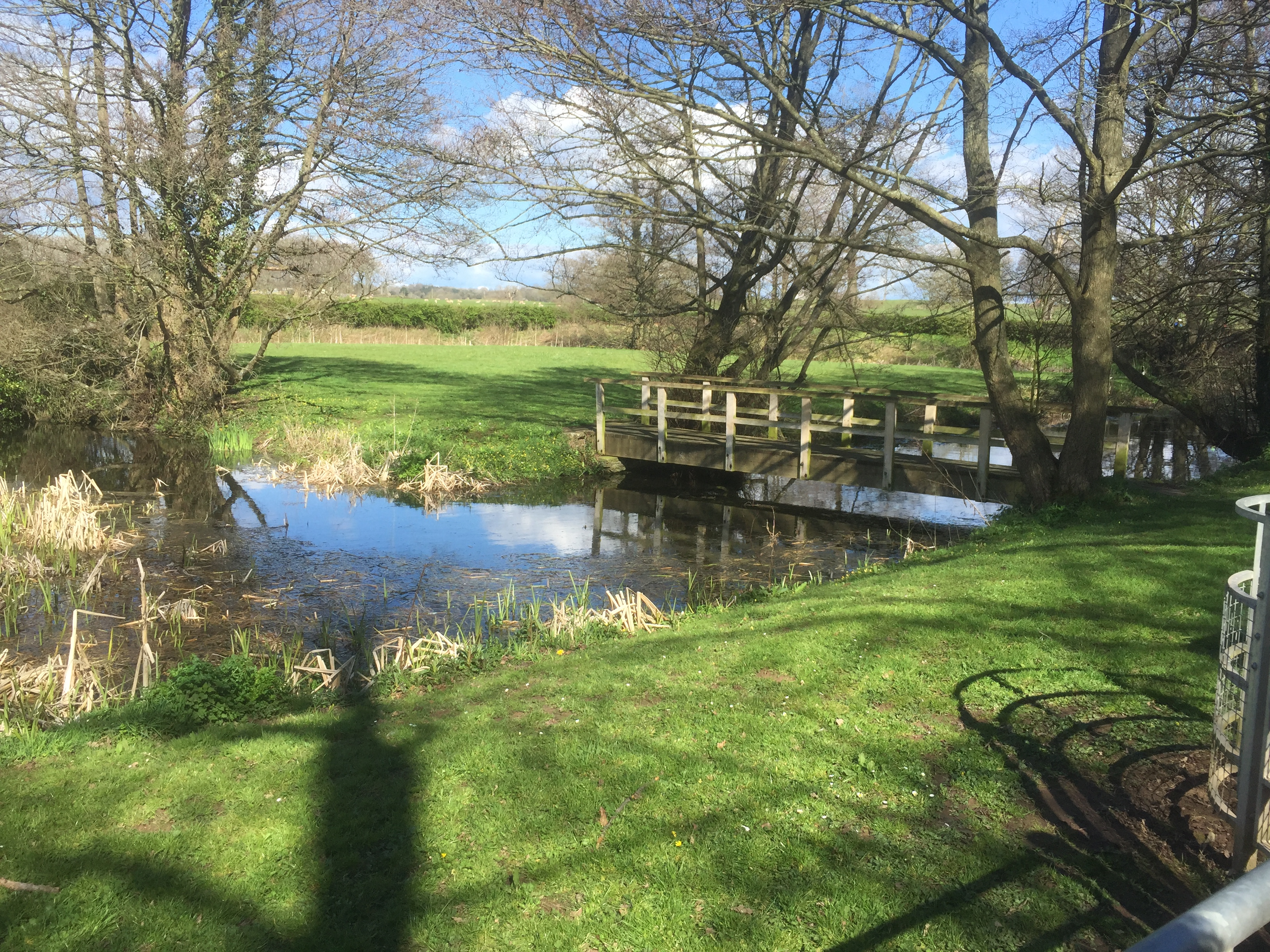
- The moat and site

- Location within Monmouthshire
- 51.8315°N 2.8782°W
- Type: Site
- Location: Llantilio Crossenny, Monmouthshire

Site notes
- Governing body: CADW

Scheduled monument
- Official name: Hen Gwrt Moated Site, Llantilio Crossenny
- Designated: 1941
- Reference no.: MM094

Hen Gwrt, (English:Old Court), Llantilio Crossenny, Monmouthshire is the site of a thirteenth century manor house and a sixteenth century hunting lodge. Originally constructed for the Bishops of Llandaff, it subsequently came into the possession of the Herberts of Raglan Castle. The bishops constructed a substantial manor house on the site in the thirteenth century, which was moated in the fourteenth. The building was then adapted by the Herberts to create a lodge within their extensive hunting grounds. The lodge continued in use until the slighting of Raglan Castle in the English Civil War.

Historical accounts of Monmouthshire traditionally identify Hen Gwrt as the home of Dafydd Gam, the legendary opponent of Owain Glyndŵr and supporter of Henry V, but there is no evidence for this.

Work at the site in the early nineteenth showed evidence of the footings of the earlier buildings, which were mapped, but by the time of subsequent archaeological investigations in the twentieth century, all of the stone on the site had been removed for road metalling. Today, no trace of either the manor or the lodge remains, and the moated site is in the care of CADW.

== History ==
In the Middle Ages ownership of the parish of Llantilio Crossenny was divided between the King and the Bishops of Llandaff, Llantelyo regis being the lands owned by the king and Llantelyo episcopi being those owned by the bishops. The bishops administered their portion from Hen Gwrt. This episcopal presence also accounts for the "exceptional scale" and "unusual grand(eur)" of the parish church, dedicated to St Teilo, which stands a little south of Hen Gwrt. The bishops' manor is believed to have been of timber construction.

By the reign of Henry VI, the manor had been leased to William ap Thomas who had purchased the manor of Raglan in 1432 and begun the great expansion of the castle. William, or possibly his son, William Herbert, enclosed a substantial deer park, of some 250 hectares, at Llantilio Crossenny. Elisabeth Whittle's Historic Gardens of Wales reproduces a map of 1610 by John Speed that shows the deer parks of Monmouthshire, including that centred at Hen Gwrt. In the Herbert's ownership, in the sixteenth century, the bishops' timber manor was reconstructed as a stone hunting lodge.

William Herbert was the grandson of Dafydd Gam, through his father's second marriage to Gwladys ferch Dafydd Gam, and this familial connection may account for the long-held tradition, repeated by both William Coxe and Sir Joseph Bradney, that Hen Gwrt was the site of Daffyd Gam's manor house. In his Introduction to The Diary of Walter Powell of Llantilio Crossenny in the County of Monmouth, Gentleman, Bradney records that David Gam's; "seat was the castle called Hengwrt (Old Court), of which only the moat remains." The church at Llantilio Crossenny has two stained glass windows, moved from Llantilio Court, showing the arms of Gam and of Herbert, but there is no documentary evidence linking Gam to the Hen Gwrt site.

In 1646, towards the end of the First English Civil War and after a three-month siege, Raglan Castle was surrendered to the Parliamentary forces of Thomas Fairfax by Henry Somerset, 1st Marquess of Worcester. The surrender, and subsequent slighting, of the castle also saw the end of the use of Hen Gwrt as a hunting lodge and its subsequent complete destruction.

In 1941, Sir Henry Mather Jackson, whose grandfather, Sir William Jackson had bought the site in 1873, and who had also owned White Castle, gave guardianship of Hen Gwrt to the Ministry of Public Building and Works. In that year, it was also designated a scheduled monument. It is now in the care of CADW.

== Description ==
The site comprises an island, rectangular in plan, and measuring 39m by 45m. The island is completely surrounded by a moat, giving dimensions of 72.5m by 76m overall, and is connected by a modern bridge over the moat, although a beam from the original bridge survives. The site offers no natural defences, and the platform within the moat has not been raised, suggesting that the moat was not intended to serve a serious defensive purpose.

Describing Hen Gwrt in his 2016 walking guide Offa's Dyke Pass, Mike Dunn writes; "the moat is clogged with bulrushes but still very picturesque and the site is open and grassy."

== Archaeology and excavations ==
Writing in 2000, in his Greater Medieval Houses of England and Wales, 1300-1500, Anthony Emery noted that "Hen Gwrt is one of the few (moated) sites to have been thoroughly examined." In the 1820s, a plan of "The foundations of the Old Court, taken as they were discovered" was drawn up at the time the stone from the site was removed for road metalling. Craster and Lewis suggest an alternative use for the stone may have been in the building of Llantilio Court. Whittle follows their suggestion and also notes that the associated changes to the road layout obliterated the southern corner of the site. The plan shows the footings of a rectangular building, built in stone, and surrounded by a stone wall encircling the inner edge of the moat. The building has both a large and a small chamber, and two rooms which probably housed latrines. By the time of later excavations in the 1950s all traces of the stone foundations had gone, although elements indicating the earlier, timber-framed, manor house of the Bishops of Llandaff were uncovered. These excavations, the most detailed undertaken at the site, were led by O.E. Craster and J.M. Lewis and their findings published in Volume 112 of the Archaeologia Cambrensis, the journal of the Cambrian Archaeological Association, in 1963. CADW considers that the site still "offers considerable archaeological potential."
