= Roger Vaughan of Bredwardine =

Welsh gentleman

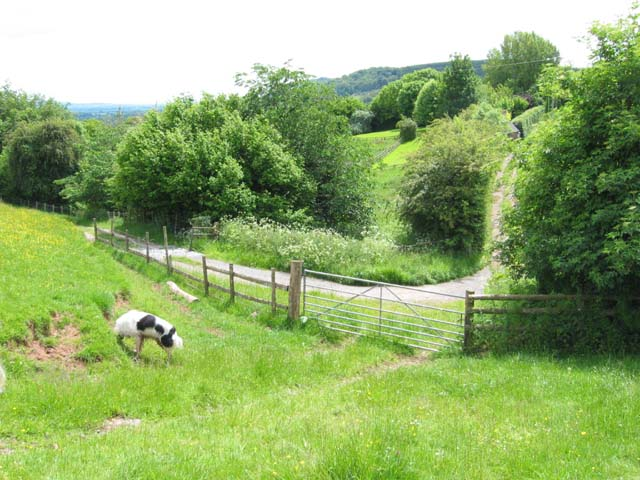
Gateway and country lane near Bredwardine

Sir Roger Vaughan of Bredwardine (died 25 October 1415), also known as Roger Fychan or Roger the younger, was a Welsh gentleman, described as having possessed wealth, rank, and high respectability. Roger's seat, Bredwardine Castle, is estimated to have been a strong and formidable fortress, located on the banks of the Wye river in Herefordshire, two miles north of Moccas Court. Bredwardine Castle is thought to have furnished much of the material for the building of Moccas Court.

== Lineage ==
The 15th century Vaughan family, gentry of Bredwardine, Tretower and Hergest, were prominent in eastern Wales and the Herefordshire borderland.

- According to later pedigrees, an English soldier named Walter Sais, settled near Tretower, moved to Bredwardine after marrying Sir Walter Bredwardine's daughter named Florence.
- An elder son, Roger Hen (the elder) (also known as Rhoger Fawr, Roger the Great), married a daughter of Sir Walter Devereux of Weobley
- Their son, Roger Vaughan, is the subject of this article.

The Vaughans' pedigree often traces descent through Walter Sais (also Seys) to Moreiddig Warwyn. While the Vaughan coat of arms, three boys’ heads with a snake entwined about their necks, originated with Moreiddig Warwyn, Vaughan family ancestry cannot be relied upon with confidence prior to the mid 14th century.

== Marriage ==
Vaughan married Gwladys ferch Dafydd Gam, daughter of Dafydd Gam, with whom he later fought in the Battle of Agincourt in 1415.

=== Issue ===
In contrast to Gwladys and Roger's allegiance to the House of Lancaster, their three sons were staunch Yorkists during the Wars of the Roses. The brothers would fight with their Herbert half-brothers during the Battle of Edgcote in 1469. Beyond their political pursuits, the Bredwardine and Hergest Vaughans supported Welsh poets. They took residence at the main Vaughan holdings of Bredwardine, Hergest, and Tretower, respectively.

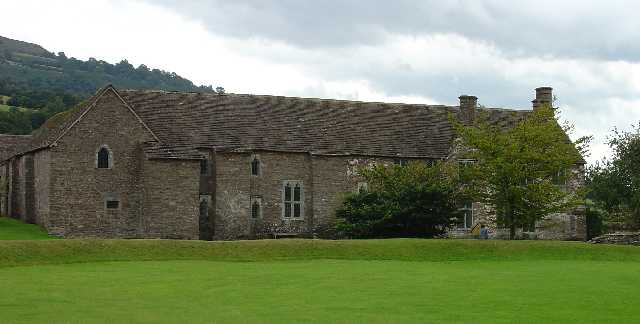
Tretower Court. A 15th century manor house, rebuilt close to Tretower Castle by Sir Roger Vaughan.

- Watkin (Walter) Vaughan (d. 1456) of Bredwardine, Esquire, married Elinor, daughter of Sir Henry Wogan, On Easter 1456, Watkin was murdered at home, Bredwardine Castle for which half-brother William Herbert and Walter Devereux forcibly ensured prosecution of execution of the culprits at Hereford.
- Thomas Vaughan (c.1400–1469) of Hergest, Esquire, married Ellen Gethin, daughter of Cadwgan ap Dafydd. From the mid-1440s, Thomas had interests in the Stafford lordships of Huntington, Brecon and Hay. September 1461, supporting the three Vaughan brother's allegiance to Yorkist rule, Edward IV appointed Thomas receiver of Brecon, Hay, and Huntington during the minority of Henry Stafford, 2nd Duke of Buckingham. In 1469, Thomas died at the Battle of Edgcote and was entombed at St Mary's Church, Kington, near Hergest.
- Sir Roger Vaughan (d. 1471) of Tretower Court married twice. Once to Denise, daughter of Thomas ap Philip Vychan, of Talgarth and secondly to Lady Margaret, daughter of Lord James Audley, another of the heroes of Agincourt. Roger fought with his father and grandfather at the Battle of Agincourt in 1415. Roger was knighted for his activities supporting the Yorkist regime. In May 1471 Roger was captured by Jasper Tudor and beheaded at Chepstow.
- Elizabeth Vaughan married gentleman Morgan ap Jenkin.
- Blanch Vaughan married wealthy Englishman John Milwater, commissioned by Edward IV to accompany Blanch's half-brother, William Herbert, to the siege of Harlech Castle.

There are other children attributed to this union: John Vaughan of Dursley, William Vaughan of Clifford and three more daughters not specifically identified.

== Battle of Agincourt ==
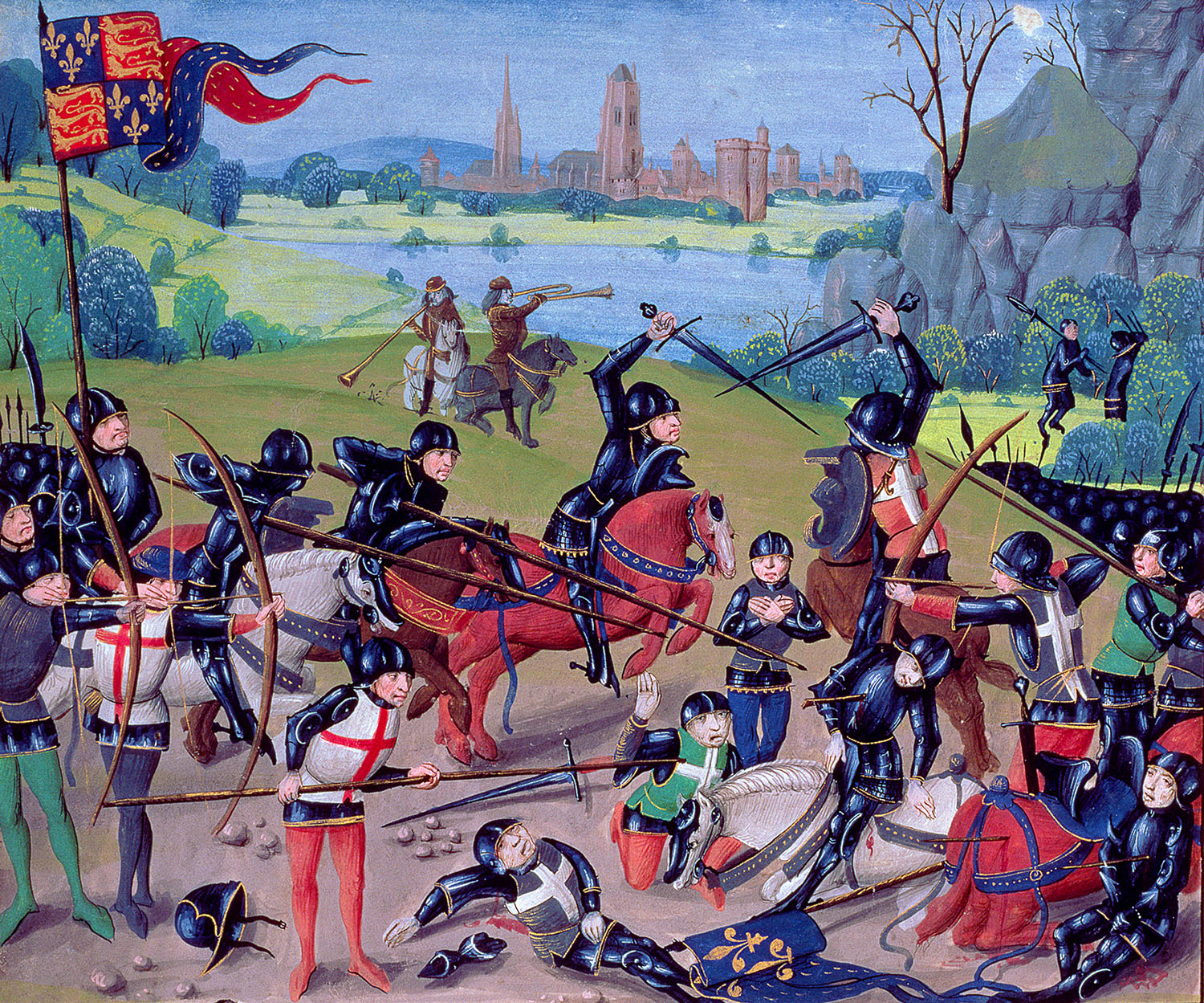
Battle of Agincourt

Roger, his father-in-law Dafydd Gam and his recently married son, Roger, had been part of the Welsh contingent that fought with Henry V of England, popularly designated Harry of Monmouth, at the Battle of Agincourt on 25 October 1415. Henry's forces faced formidable odds: illness and impediments in the form of destroyed bridges, well-guarded river crossings, fortification and greatly hindered access to cattle as a means of food by the French. Henry's extremely loyal troops pushed on in spite of illness, starvation and fatigue. Upon hearing that his army would be outnumbered, Henry sent Roger's father-in-law Dafydd Gam to observe the size and motion of the French troops. Observing that they would be significantly outnumbered, and not wanting to daunt Henry or his kinmen, Dafydd's response upon his return was that there were "enough to be killed, enough to be taken prisoners and enough to be run away."

Sixteen French knights who had taken a solemn oath to do what was necessary to seize Henry V, succeeding in unhorsing the king, who risked certain death at the hands of the knights. Dayfdd called to his Brecon kinsmen, including both Roger Vaughans, William ap Thomas and William Lloyd. They managed to bring down each of the sixteen knights. Henry V's valiant fight and his own exposure to danger in order to protect his injured brother, Humphrey of Lancaster, 1st Duke of Gloucester, inspired and emboldened the English who met the French forces decidedly, killing or capturing their leaders, resulting in confusion and flight.

While Henry V would meet with success in this battle, Dafydd, the elder Roger Vaughan and William Lloyd were mortally wounded.

Legends appeared in the 16th century claiming that upon saving the life of Henry V at the expense of their own lives, both men were knighted by the king on the battlefield before they died. However, there is no contemporary validation that the legends are true.
