= Gwladys ferch Dafydd Gam =

Welsh noblewoman

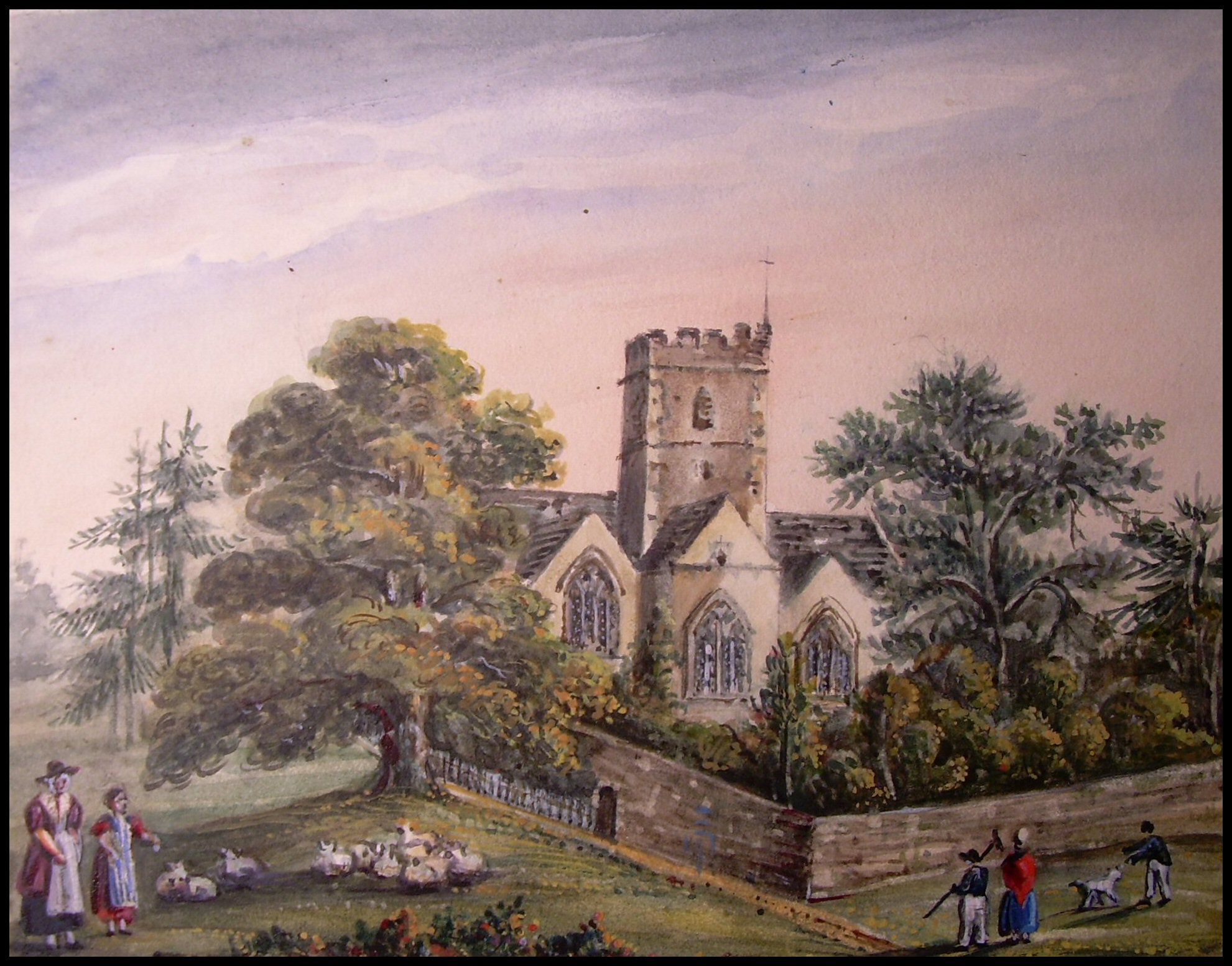
Gwladys and William ap Thomas were patrons of Abergavenny Priory, where they were both buried

Gwladys ferch Dafydd Gam (died 1454) was a Welsh noblewoman. She was the daughter of Dafydd ap Llewelyn ap Hywel, otherwise known as Dafydd Gam, who was killed at the Battle of Agincourt in 1415.

Gwladys was named "the star of Abergavenny" (Welsh: Seren-y-fenni) —"Gwladys the happy and the faultless" by Welsh poet Lewys Glyn Cothi. He describes the lady of Raglan Castle, which she became upon her second marriage, as a brilliant being, "like the sun—the pavilion of light." She has been compared to the legendary Queen Marcia for her discretion and influence.

== Childhood ==
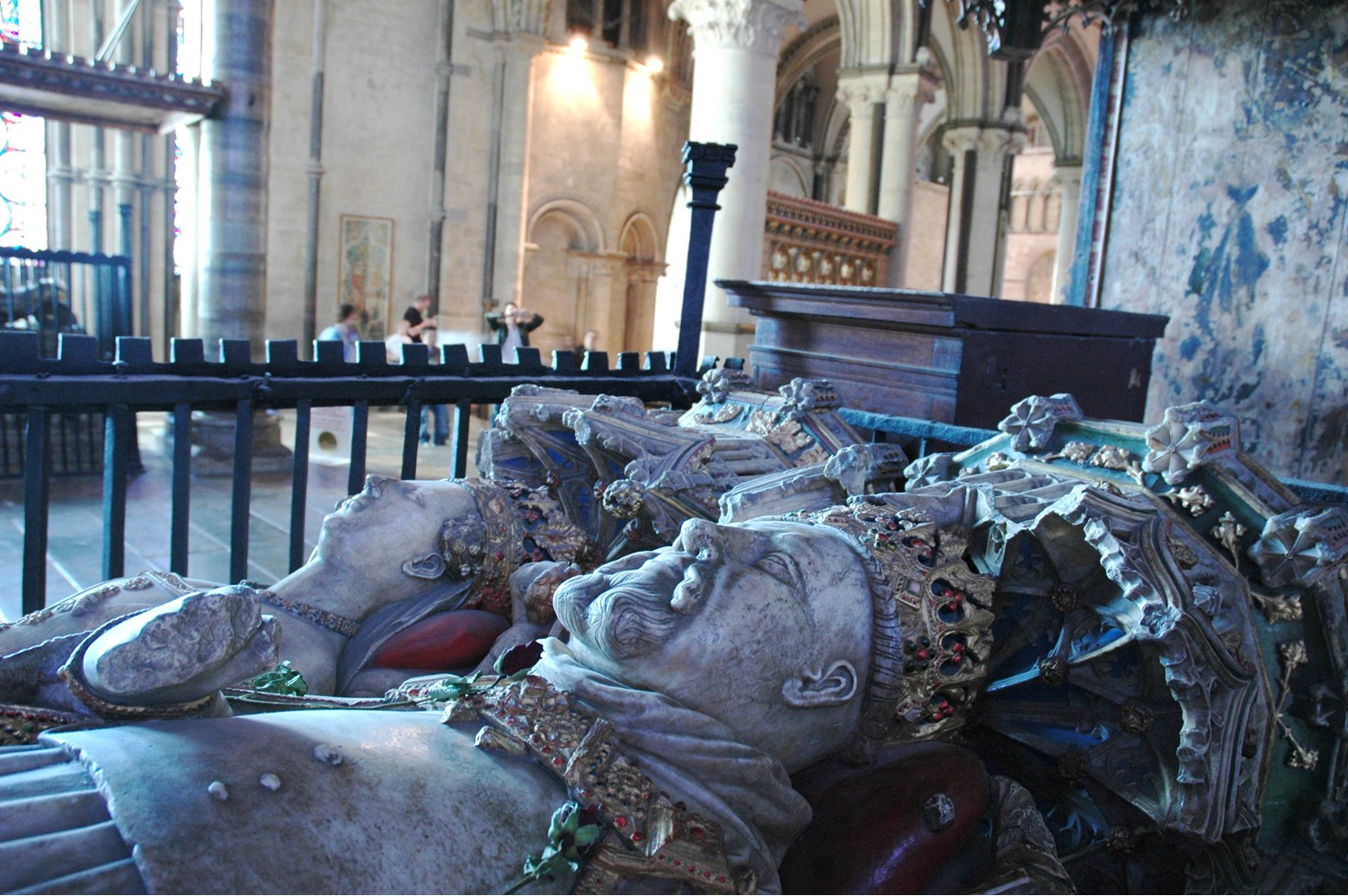
Monument to King Henry IV of England and his queen, Joan of Navarre, in Canterbury Cathedral, Kent. Gwladys served as a Maid-of-Honour to both of Henry's wives

Gwladys's father, Dafydd, was a gentleman of considerable property and a celebrated military figure, descended from the native Welsh rulers of Brycheiniog. He was a prominent opponent of Owain Glyndŵr. Accounts of her mother are unclear. According to Prichard, Dafydd married Gwenllian, daughter of wealthy gentleman Gwilym ab Howel and grew up on an estate named "Petyn Gwyn" near the town of Brecon, in the parish of Garthbrengy, The Oxford Dictionary of National Biography more recently reports that some genealogists claim Dafydd's wife to have been Gwladys, daughter of Gwilym ap Hywel Crach. (1374–6).

On 16 September 1400, Owain Glyndŵr instigated the Welsh Revolt against the rule of Henry IV of England from the House of Lancaster. Dafydd, "one of Owain's most die-hard opponents," supported the English monarchy for the next twelve years in opposition to his Welsh countrymen.

During opposition to Owain Glyndŵr, Dafydd's lands in and around Brecon became a target for Glyndŵr's attacks. Owain is recorded to have arrived at the family's principal residence at Petyn Gwyn where he captured and assaulted Lady Gwenllian. After imprisoning her inside the house, he burnt the mansion to the ground.

Driven from their last home in Wales, Gwladys, with her father, grandfather, and her two brothers, found refuge at King Henry IV's court, where Gwladys served as a Maid of Honour firstly to Mary de Bohun (c. 1368–1394), wife of Henry IV, and afterwards to Queen Joan (c. 1370–1437), his second wife and only queen consort.

== First marriage ==
=== Sir Roger Vaughan ===
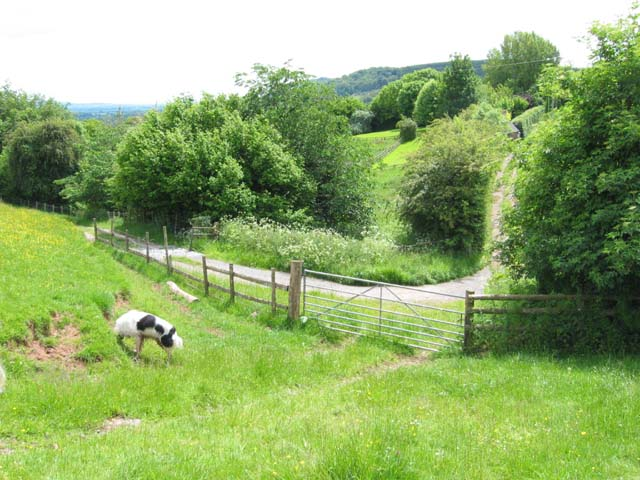
Gateway and country lane near Bredwardine

Gwladys married her first husband, Sir Roger Vaughan of Bredwardine also known as Roger Fychan (the younger), after her family returned to Wales. Roger, a gentleman of wealth, rank, and high respectability was a special friend of her father's, and would later be his companion in arms at the Battle of Agincourt.

Following her marriage, she never again left Wales. Gwladys was a supporter of Welsh culture, especially of the bards and minstrels of her time. In Lewus Glyn Cothi's elegy, Gwladys is called "the strength and support of Gwentland and the land of Brychan" (later the counties of Monmouth and Brecon): which she supported extensively.

=== Battle of Agincourt ===
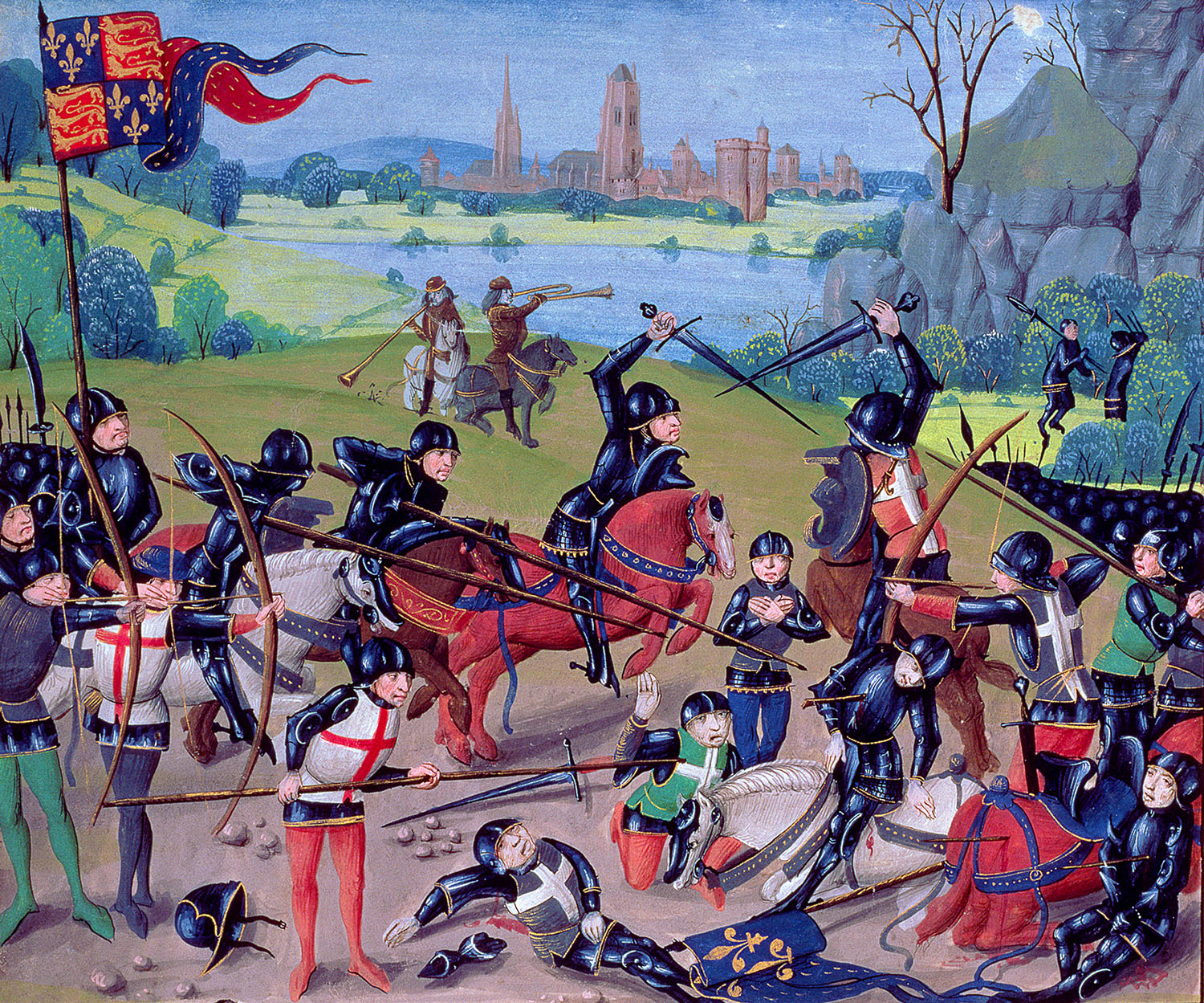
Battle of Agincourt

Gwladys' father Dafydd, and her husband Roger, had been part of the Welsh contingent that fought with Henry V of England; they both died at the Battle of Agincourt in France in 1415. Legends appeared in the 16th century claiming that upon saving the life of Henry V at the expense of their own lives, both men were knighted by the king on the battlefield before they died. However, there is no contemporary validation that the legends are true.

=== Issue ===
In contrast to Gwladys and Roger's allegiance to the House of Lancaster and Sir William ap Thomas's daughter, their three sons were staunch Yorkists during the Wars of the Roses. The brothers would fight with their Herbert half-brothers during the Battle of Edgecote Moor in 1469. Beyond their political pursuits, the Bredwardine and Hergest Vaughans supported Welsh poets. They took residence at the main Vaughan holdings of Bredwardine, Hergest, and Tretower, respectively.

- Watkin (Walter) Vaughan (d. 1456) of Bredwardine, Esquire, married Elinor, daughter of Sir Henry Wogan, On Easter 1456, Watkin was murdered at home, Bredwardine Castle for which half-brother William Herbert and Walter Devereux forcibly ensured prosecution of execution of the culprits at Hereford.
- Thomas Vaughan (c.1400–1469) of Hergest, Esquire, married Ellen Gethin, daughter of Cadwgan ap Dafydd. From the mid-1440s, Thomas had interests in the Stafford lordships of Huntington, Brecon and Hay. September 1461, supporting the three Vaughan brother's allegiance to Yorkist rule, Edward IV appointed Thomas receiver of Brecon, Hay, and Huntington during the minority of Henry Stafford, 2nd Duke of Buckingham. In 1469, Thomas died at the Battle of Edgecote and entombed at Kington church, near Hergest.

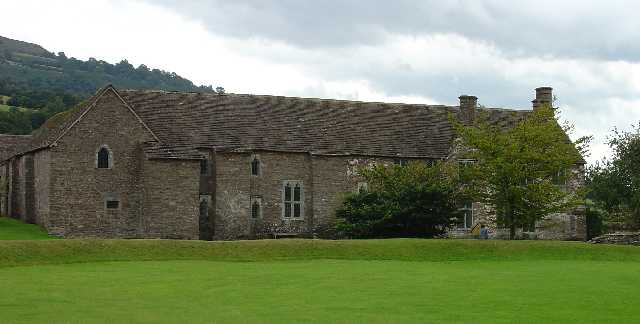
Tretower Court. A 15th-century manor house, rebuilt close to Tretower Castle by Sir Roger Vaughan.

- Sir Roger Vaughan (d. 1471) of Tretower Court married twice. Once to Cicely, daughter of Thomas ab Philip Vychan, of Talgarth and second Lady Margaret, daughter of Lord James Audley, another of the heroes of Agincourt. Roger fought with his father and grandfather at the Battle of Agincourt in 1415. Roger was knighted for his activities supporting the Yorkist regime. In May 1471 Roger was captured by Jasper Tudor and beheaded at Chepstow.
- Elizabeth Vaughan married gentleman Griffith ab Eineon.
- Blanch Vaughan married wealthy Englishman John Milwater, commissioned by Edward IV to accompany Blanch's half-brother, William Herbert, to the siege of Harlech Castle.

There are other children less reliably attributed to this union: John Vaughan of Dursley, William Vaughan of Clifford and three more daughters not specifically identified.

== William ap Thomas ==
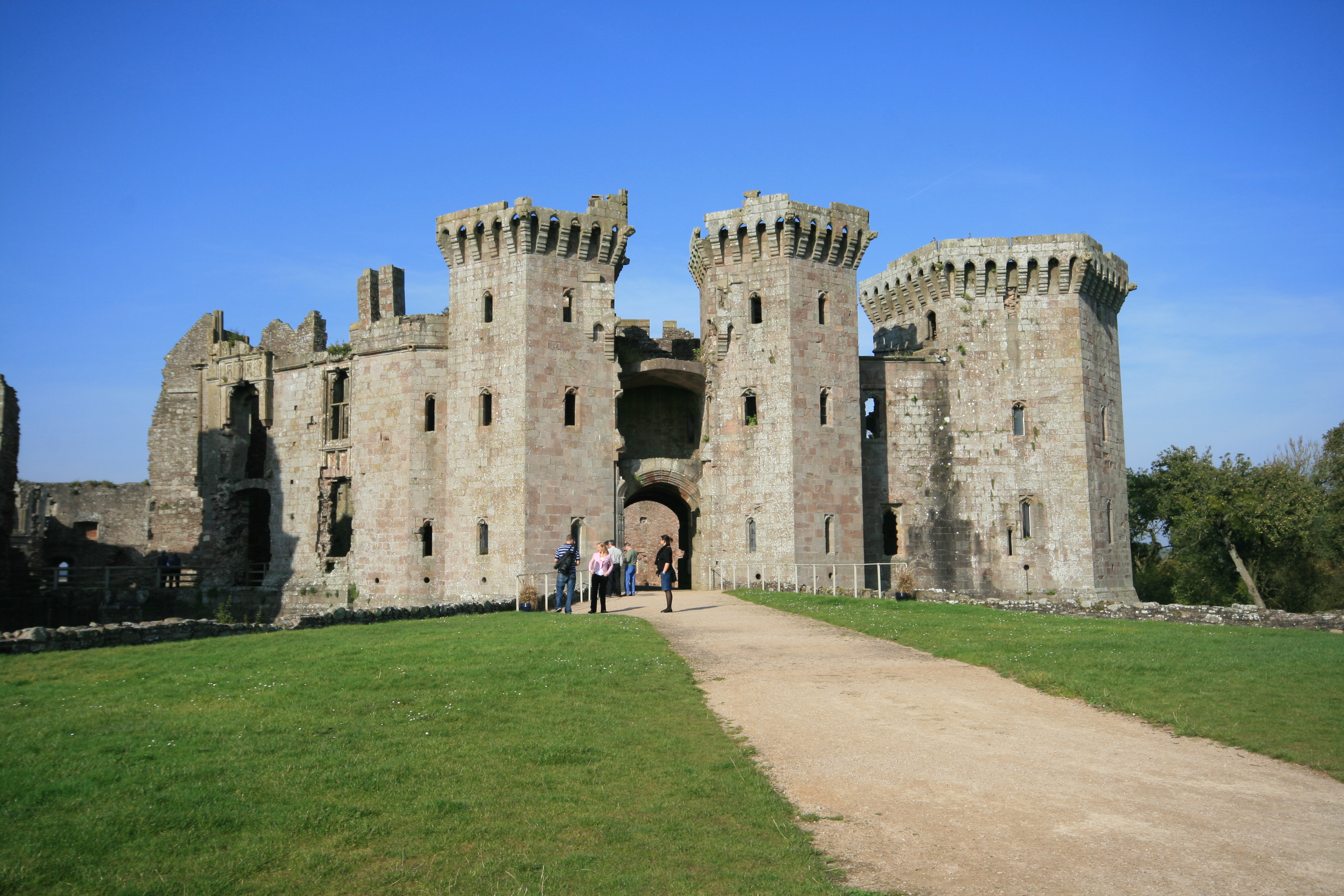
The main entrance of Raglan Castle, now ruined

Her second marriage was to Sir William ap Thomas of Raglan Castle who also fought at the Battle of Agincourt. William was the son of Thomas ap Gwilym ap Jenkyn, a local landowner and his wife Maud, daughter of Sir John Morley. He was knighted in 1426 and was known, because of the colour of his armour, as "The Blue Knight of Gwent."

As Lady of Raglan Castle, Gwladys was able to entertain her guests and assist the needy and afflicted on an even greater scale than when the mistress of Bredwardine Castle.

Gwladys and William's children were raised with the Vaughan children

=== Issue ===
The children of Gwladys and William were:

- William Herbert, 1st Earl of Pembroke (1423–1469) took the surname Herbert. William's allegiance to Richard, Duke of York, and Richard Neville, 16th Earl of Warwick, branded him Edward IV's Welsh "master-lock". He was the first full-blooded Welshman to enter the English peerage and he was knighted in 1452. He married Anne Devereux daughter of Sir Walter Devereux in 1449, by whom he had issue.
- Sir Richard Herbert of Coldbrook, near Abergavenny; died on the battlefield of Danesmoor.
- Elizabeth married Sir Henry Stradling (1423–1476), son of Sir Edward Stradling (d. c.1453) and the Lady Jane Joan Plantagenet de Beaufort (the bastard daughter of Cardinal Beaufort; m 1423).

Reversing alliances from the previous generation, Henry and his brothers-in-law were hostile to Henry VI's reign. Henry went on a pilgrimage to the Holy Land in 1476. Henry died on 31 August 1476 on his journey back to England and was buried at Famagusta, Cyprus. Thomas, Elizabeth and Henry's young son died on 8 September 1480.

- Margaret married Sir Henry Wogan, steward and treasurer of the Earldom of Pembroke, tasked with securing war material for the defence of Pembroke Castle. Henry and his father, John Wogan of Picton, witnessed an act of Bishop Benedict in 1418. Their son, Sir John Wogan, was killed at the battle of Banbury in 1469, fighting by the side of his uncle, William Herbert, Earl of Pembroke.

Other issue less consistently attributed to Gwladys and William include: Maud, Olivia, Elizabeth (who married Welsh country gentlemen, John ab Gwilym), and Thomas Herbert.

The Cornish family of Thomas (Thomas of Lelant, Thomas of Crowan, Thomas of Tremayne, Thoms, and the Bosarvanes of St Just), all patrilineally descended from "Richard Thomas gent. of Wales" are acknowledged as legitimate agnatic descendants of William ap Thomas in the 1620 Visitation of Cornwall, and thus of Gwladys.

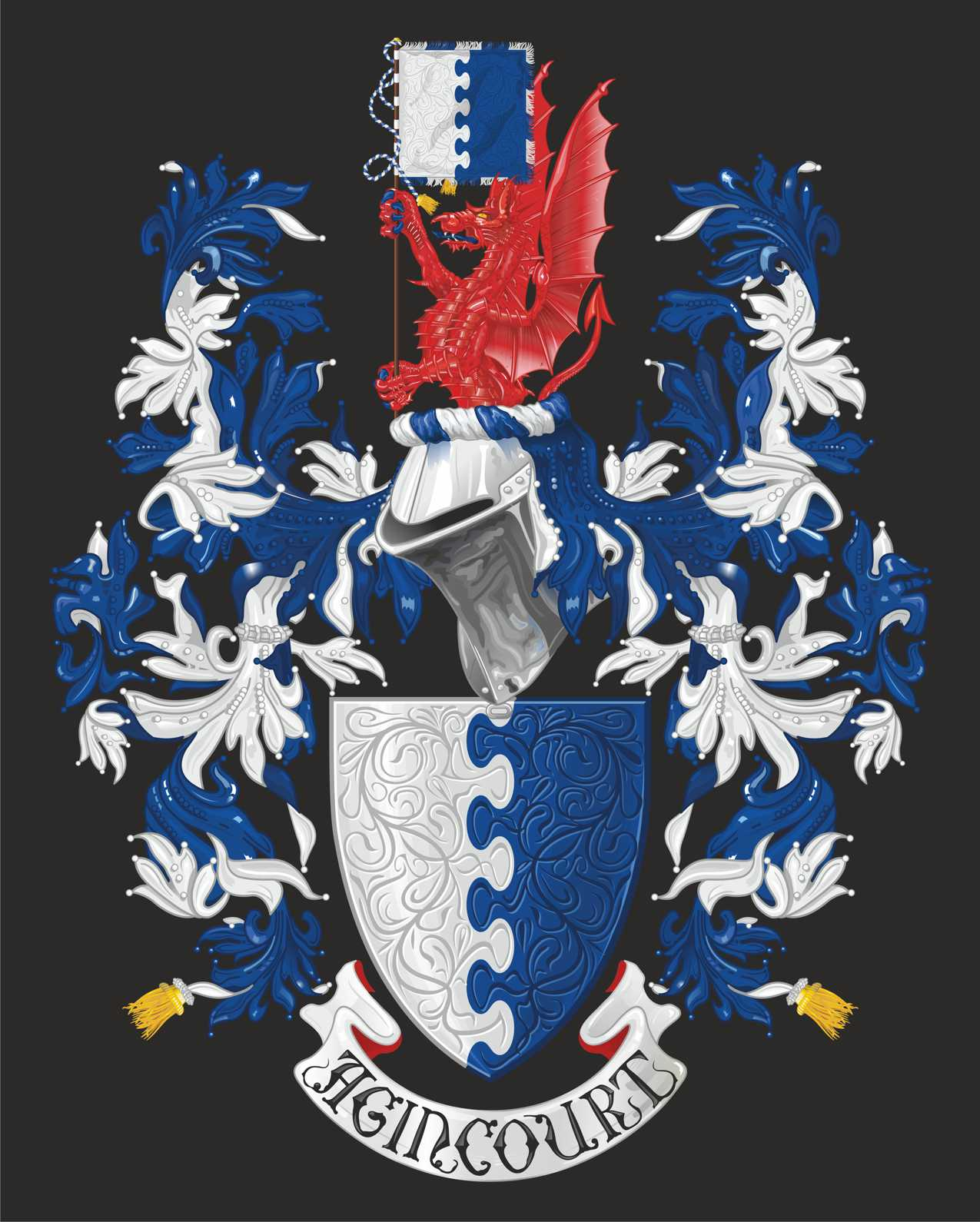
The Thomas armorial achievement as borne by the living descendants of the Rev. William Courtenay Thomas, himself an agnatic descendant of William ap Thomas.

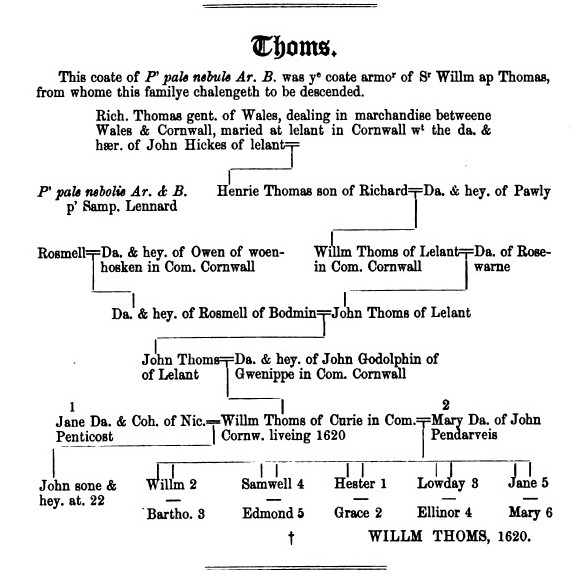
one of the entries for the Cornish Thomas family from the 1620 Visitation.

The Visitation records state "This coate of Pr pale nebule Ar. B. was ye coate armor of Sr Willm ap Thomas, from whom this familye chalengeth to be descended."

Descendants of this family include Members of Parliament, such as John Thomas who sat in the 1555 Parliament for the Cornish borough of Mitchell, members of the clergy such as Methodist minister the Reverend William Courtenay Thomas and his descendants, and related pioneering families in Australia.

Lady Gwladys mourned at length when William died in 1445.

== Death ==
She died in 1454. Gwladys and her husband William ap Thomas were patrons of Abergavenny Priory where they were both buried; their alabaster tomb and effigies can still be seen in the church of St Mary's.

Gwladys was so beloved by her people that, according to legend, 3,000 knights, nobles and weeping peasantry followed her body from Coldbrook House (her son Richard's manor) to the Herbert Chapel of St. Mary's Priory Church where she was buried.

== Notes ==
=== Bibliography ===
- Prichard, T. J. Llewelyn. (1854). The Heroines of Welsh History: Or Memoirs of the Celebrated Women of Wales. London: W & F G Cash.
- Prichard, T. J. Llewelyn. (2007) [1854]. The Heroines of Welsh History: Or Memoirs of the Celebrated Women of Wales (Reprinted ed.). Kessinger Publishing, LLC. ISBN 978-1-4325-2662-7.
- Hodgdon, George E.; Hancock, Thomas W. (1918). Reminiscences and genealogical record of the Vaughan family of New Hampshire. New York: Rochester. LCCN 18007045.
- Evans, Howell T. (1915). Wales and the wars of the Roses. Cambridge University Press. LCCN 15019453.
