= Anne Devereux =

English noblewoman

Anne Devereux, Countess of Pembroke (c. 1430 – after 25 June 1486), was an English noblewoman, who was Countess of Pembroke during the 15th century by virtue of marriage to William Herbert, 1st Earl of Pembroke.

She was born in Bodenham, the daughter of Sir Walter Devereux, the Lord Chancellor of Ireland, and his wife Elizabeth Merbury. Anne's grandfather, Walter, was the son of Agnes Crophull. By Crophull's second marriage to Sir John Parr, Anne was a cousin to the Parr family which included Sir Thomas Parr; father of King Henry VIII's last Queen Consort, Katherine Parr.

== Marriage ==
About 1445, Anne married William Herbert, 1st Earl of Pembroke, in Herefordshire, England. He was the second son of Sir William ap Thomas of Raglan, a member of the Welsh Gentry Family, and his second wife Gwladys ferch Dafydd Gam.

William Herbert was a very ambitious man. During the War of the Roses, Wales heavily supported the Lancastrian cause. Jasper Tudor, 1st Earl of Pembroke and other Lancastrians remained in control of fortresses at Pembroke, Harlech, Carreg Cennen, and Denbigh.

On 8 May 1461, as a loyal supporter of King Edward IV, Herbert was appointed Life Chamberlain of South Wales and steward of Carmarthenshire and Cardiganshire. King Edward's appointment signaled his intention to replace Jasper Tudor with Herbert, who thus would become the premier nobleman in Wales. Herbert was created Lord Herbert on 26 July 1461. Herbert was then ordered to seize the county and title of Earl of Pembroke from Jasper Tudor. By the end of August, Herbert had taken back control of Wales with the well fortified Pembroke Castle capitulating on 30 September 1461.

With this victory for the House of York came the inmate at Pembroke; the five-year-old nephew of Jasper Tudor, Henry, Earl of Richmond. Determined to enhance his power and arrange good marriages for his daughters, in March 1462 Anne's husband paid 1,000 for the wardship of Henry Tudor. Herbert planned a marriage between Tudor and his eldest daughter, Maud. At the same time, Herbert secured the young Henry Percy who had just inherited the title of Earl of Northumberland.

Herbert's court at Raglan Castle was where young Henry Tudor would spend his childhood, under the supervision of Herbert's wife, Anne Devereux, who ensured that young Henry was well cared for.

== Issue ==
The Earl and Countess of Pembroke had three sons and seven daughters:

- Sir William Herbert, 2nd Earl of Pembroke, Earl of Huntingdon, married firstly to Mary Woodville; daughter of Richard Woodville, 1st Earl Rivers and thus sister to King Edward IV's Queen Consort Elizabeth Woodville. He married secondly to Lady Katherine Plantagenet, the illegitimate daughter of King Richard III.
- Sir Walter Herbert, husband of Lady Anne Stafford
- Sir George Herbert
- Lady Maud Herbert, wife of Sir Henry Percy, 4th Earl of Northumberland, 7th Lord Percy.
- Lady Katherine Herbert, wife of Sir George Grey, 2nd Earl of Kent.
- Lady Anne Herbert, wife of Sir John Grey, 1st Baron Grey of Powis.
- Lady Margaret Herbert, wife of Sir Thomas Talbot, 2nd Viscount Lisle, and of Sir Henry Bodrugan.
- Lady Cecily Herbert, wife of John Greystoke.
- Lady Elizabeth Herbert, wife of Sir Thomas Cokesey.
- Lady Crisli Herbert, wife of Mr. Cornwall.

The Earl of Pembroke also fathered several children by various mistresses.
