= Roger Vaughan of Tretower =

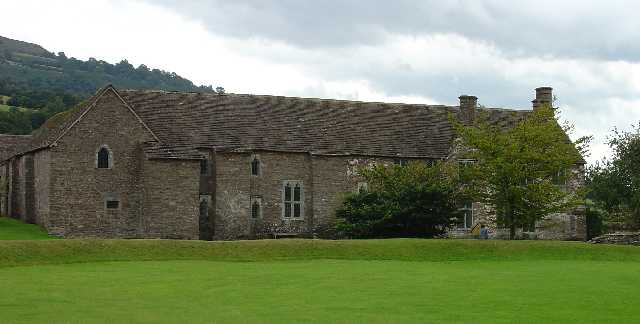
Tretower Court. A 15th century manor house, rebuilt close to Tretower Castle by Sir Roger Vaughan.

Sir Roger Vaughan (died 1471) of Tretower Court, was the son of Welsh noblewoman Gwladys ferch Dafydd Gam and Sir Roger Vaughan of Bredwardine, who fought and died with Gwladys's father, Dafydd Gam in the Battle of Agincourt in 1415.

== Personal life ==
Roger was married three times. His first wife, Denise (her name is sometimes given as Cicely), daughter of Thomas ab Philip Vychan, of Talgarth, celebrated in one of the poems of Lewus Glyn Cothi, died not long after Roger's return from the Battle of Agincourt. She was the mother of his heir, Sir Thomas Vaughan, another son, Roger Vaughan of Porthaml, and four daughters, all of whom married into prominent Welsh families.

He then married Margaret Tuchet, daughter of Lord Audley, another of the English heroes of Agincourt and, later, Eleanor Holland, natural daughter of the Earl of Kent. They had one daughter, who married Humphrey Kynaston. He was also alleged to have fathered a number of illegitimate children.

== Wars of the Roses ==
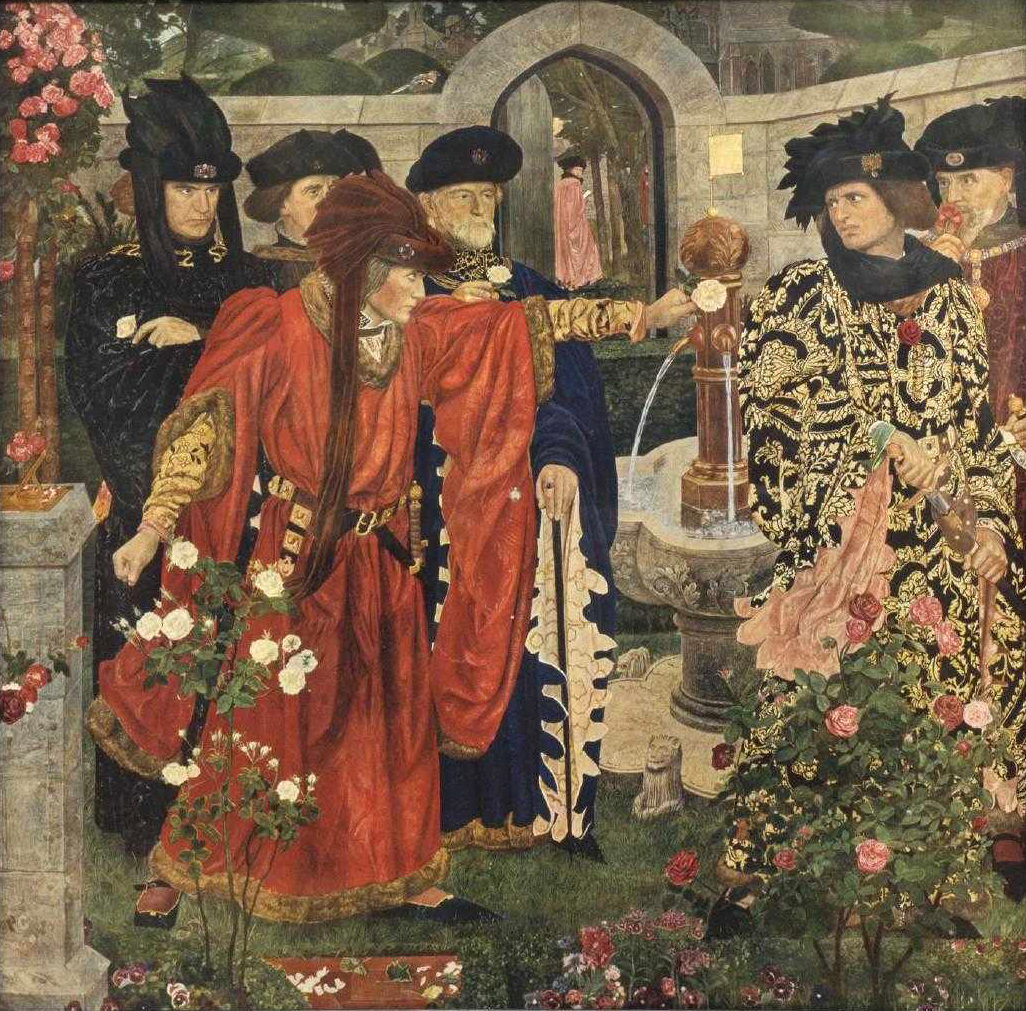
Plucking the Red and White Roses in the Old Temple Gardens, depicting the split of nobles into the factions of York and Lancaster (1908) by Henry Arthur Payne

During the series of dynastic civil wars known as the Wars of the Roses (1455–1485), loyalties in England were split between the House of Lancaster and the House of York. Roger's parents were loyal Lancastrians, and Roger fought with his father for Henry V of England at the Battle of Agincourt. In later years, though, Roger and his brothers Watkin and Thomas switched allegiances, becoming staunch Yorkists.

Roger was given positions of responsibility and knighted by 23 March 1465 for his activities supporting the Yorkist faction:

- Richard, Duke of York awarded Roger the post of receiver of Builth Wells as early as 1442–3.
- He was instrumental, with his brothers and others, in securing Wales for Edward IV. As directed by the Privy Council on 17 August 1460, they prevented assembly and supply of foods at castles. Roger fought with the Yorkists at the Battle of Mortimer's Cross in February 1461 and is said to have led Owen Tudor to execution at Hereford after the battle.
- Roger was steward and receiver of Cantref Selyf, Alexanderston, and Pencell.
- In 1465, had a role in suppressing an upring in Carmarthenshire.
- On 16 February 1470 he was appointed constable of Cardigan Castle.

Roger is thought to have received the fortified manor, Tretower Court, as a gift from his half-brother William Herbert, 1st Earl of Pembroke.

== Execution ==
In May 1471, Roger was sent by King Edward to capture Jasper Tudor; however, Roger instead fell into Jasper's hands and he was consequently beheaded at Chepstow, which resulted in further acrimonious sentiments towards the Tudors by the Vaughans and Herberts.
