= Elisabeth Whittle =

Garden historian from Wales

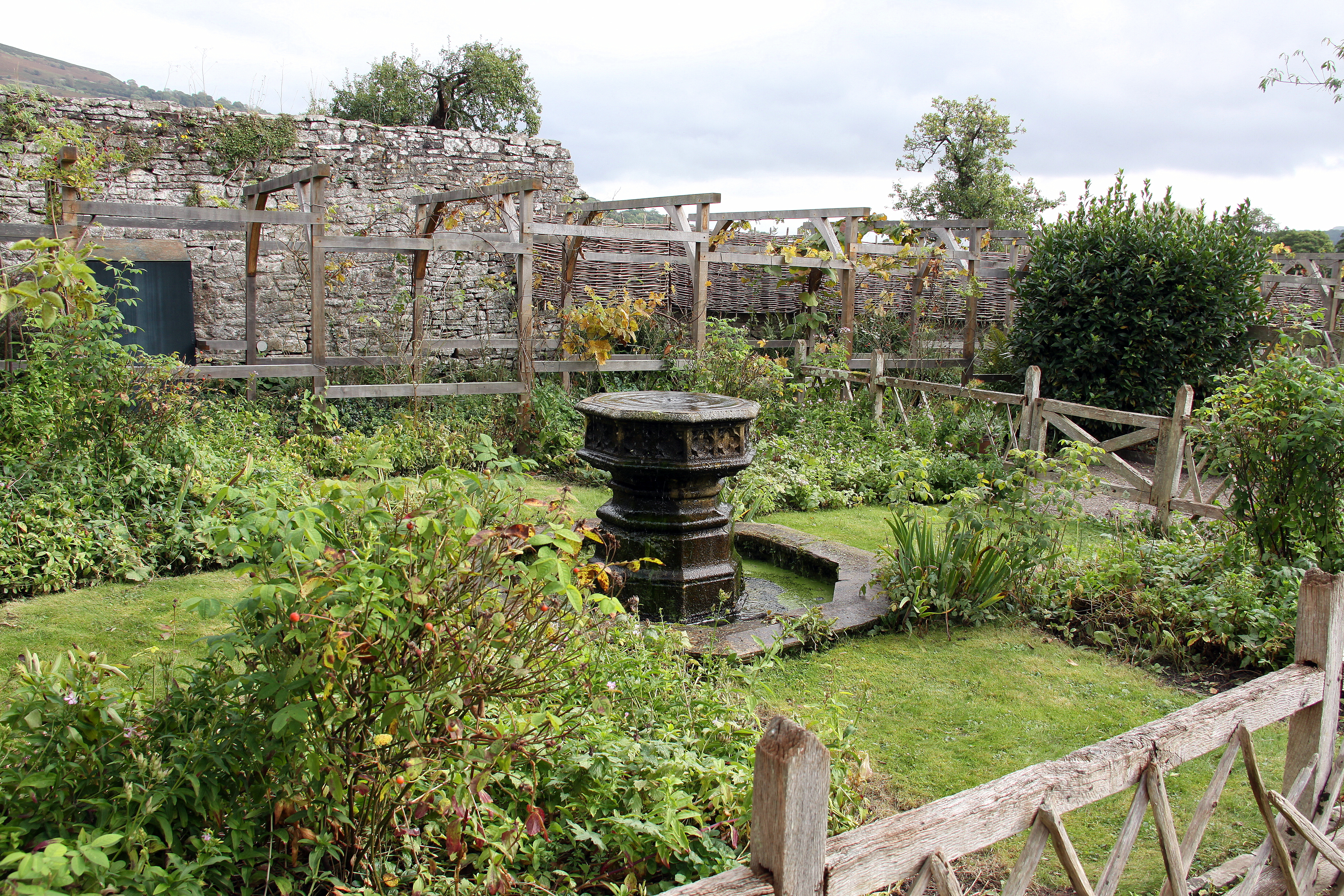
- The recreated Tudor garden at Tretower Court designed by Whittle
- Education: Master of Arts
- Occupations: Author; Historian
- Years active: 1993–present
- Known for: Garden historian
- Notable work: Book: Historic Gardens of Wales: An Introduction to Parks and Gardens in the History of Wales

Elisabeth Whittle is a garden historian from Wales. A former president of the Welsh Historic Gardens Trust and a trustee of the National Botanic Garden of Wales, her published works include studies of the historic gardens of Wales and of the history of Glamorgan and Gwent. She is a fellow of the Society of Antiquaries of London.

== Career ==
For twenty-one years Whittle worked for Cadw, the Welsh historic environment agency as their Inspector of Historic Parks, Gardens and Landscapes. She retired in 2014. She is a former president of the Welsh Historic Gardens Trust and is a trustee of the National Botanic Garden of Wales. Whittle, the holder of a Master of Arts degree and a fellow of the Society of Antiquaries of London, lived in Usk, Monmouthshire for many years, but moved to Wilburton, Cambridgeshire in 2019. Following her relocation, Whittle took on the chair of the Cambridgeshire Gardens Trust.

Whittle was a member of the Garden History Society from the early 1980s and between 1989 and 1997 co-edited, with Jane Crawley, their journal Garden History. She has a particular interest in Tudor and Stuart gardens. In 1991 she re-created the 15th-century garden of Sir Roger Vaughan at Tretower Court in Powys, Wales. She also discovered evidence of the 17th-century appearance of the gardens at Raglan Castle, now destroyed, which has been published in the Cadw guidebook.

In 1994 Whittle led work on the compilation of the Cadw/ICOMOS Register of Parks and Gardens of Special Historic Interest in Wales to assist owners, developers and planners to manage the country's landscape heritage. She became a trustee of the Hobson's Conduit Trust in 2018 and vice-chair in 2020. John Newman, author of the Gwent/Monmouthshire volume in the Pevsner Buildings of Wales series, recorded his debt to Whittle in the foreword to his work.

== Selected works ==
- Historic Gardens of Wales: An Introduction to Parks and Gardens in the History of Wales (1992) ISBN 9780117015784 (OCLC 60058597)
- Guide to Ancient & Historic Wales: Glamorgan and Gwent (1992) ISBN 9780117012219 (OCLC 30739843).
