= Tretower =

Hamlet in Powys, Wales

Coordinates: 51°53′N 3°11′W

Tretower: Welsh: Tretŵr
- Location within Powys
- Community: Cwmdu and District
- Principal area: Powys
- Country: Wales
- Sovereign state: United Kingdom
- Police: Dyfed-Powys
- Fire: Mid and West Wales
- Ambulance: Welsh

Tretower (Welsh: Tretŵr) is a hamlet in the community of Cwmdu and District, in the southern part of the county of Powys in Wales. It lies on the A479 road within the Brecon Beacons National Park (Bannau Brycheiniog) at the foot of the Black Mountains just off the Usk Valley. Tretower is frequented by tourists visiting the impressive Tretower Court and the nearby ruins of Tretower Castle, both of which are now managed by Cadw. Cadw own the Court whilst ownership of the Castle lies with the owner of Tyllys Farm in the centre of the village.

Tretower Church in the village is dedicated to St John the Evangelist. Though the site is ancient, the present church was completely re-built in 1876–77 after the earlier structure had fallen into disrepair.

The Green Man Festival takes place annually in the grounds of Glanusk Park a mile to the south-east of the village.
