= Bredwardine Castle =

Former castle in England

- Bredwardine, Herefordshire, England
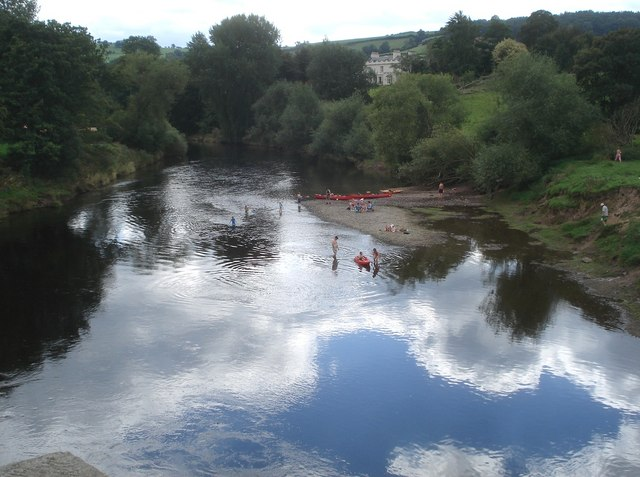
- The castle site today

Location
- Shown within Herefordshire
- Coordinates: 52.0939°N 2.9721°W
- Grid reference: grid reference SO335444

Bredwardine Castle was sited in the village of Bredwardine in Herefordshire, England beside the River Wye. Thought to have been built in the second half of the 12th century. By the 15th century it had become a ruin.

== History ==
=== Early Norman Manor ===
Following the time of the Norman Conquest the manor was granted to John de Bredwardine.

=== 12th Century Castle ===
It is thought that the castle was built in the second half of the 12th century. By 1227 the castle had become the property of the Baskerville family. In the following century it was held by Hugh de Lacy.

=== Refortification and dismantling ===
Bredwardine Castle was rebuilt as a fortress during the wars of Stephen and Matilda but then dismantled in the reign of Henry II or Henry III. In the middle of the 15th century the castle was described as being a "waste site with no annual value".

The ruined castle and manor passed from the Baskerville family to the Vaughan family. Roger Vaughan was the son in law of Dafydd Gam and converted the castle and manor into a multi-gabled house. Currently, only traces of the stone can be found on the walls of the tower.

== See also ==
- Castles in Great Britain and Ireland
- List of castles in England
