= St Teilo's Church, Llantilio Crossenny =

Church of St Teilo, Llantilio Crosseny
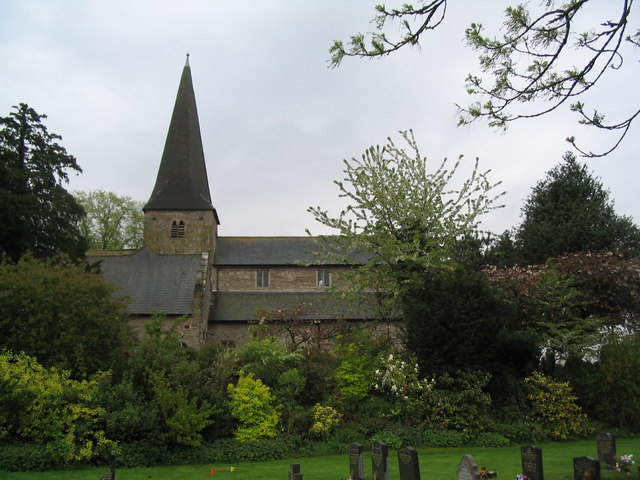
- Church of St Teilo
- Church of St Teilo, Llantilio Crosseny
- 51.8302°N 2.8737°W
- Location: Monmouthshire
- Country: Wales
- Denomination: Church in Wales

History
- Status: Grade I listed

Architecture
- Style: Early English and Decorated
- Years built: 13th century

Administration
- Diocese: Monmouth

The Church of St Teilo is the parish church of Llantilio Crossenny, Monmouthshire, Wales. "An unusually grand cruciform church", with an Early English tower crossed by a Decorated chancel, it was designated a Grade I listed building on 19 November 1953

The church is dedicated to Saint Teilo.

== History and architecture ==
Llantilio Crossenny was a manor of the Bishops of Llandaff in the Middle Ages, and the site of their manor house can still be seen at Hen Gwrt. Their episcopal presence and the proximity of White Castle account for the "exceptional scale" of the church. It is of Old Red Sandstone with a "landmark" shingled spire. The tower and the nave are of the thirteenth century whilst the chancel was rebuilt in the fourteenth. The spire was added in the early eighteenth century and the whole was restored by John Prichard and John Pollard Seddon in 1856–57.

The interior is described as "outstanding" by the Royal Commission on the Ancient and Historical Monuments of Wales. Either side of the East window of the chapel are two stone corbels which are said to represent Edward II. The interior also has a number of seventeenth and eighteenth century funerary monuments of high quality and stained glass by Charles Eamer Kempe.

== The Church ==
The Priest-in-Charge is the Revd Heidi Prince, who was the Vicar of Llantilio Crossenny between 1997 and 2006, and was, uniquely, re-appointed to the parish in 2015.

Services are held on the first and third Sunday of each month, as well as for all the principal Christian feast days. Details can be found on the parish's website.
