= Tretower Castle =

Ruined castle in Tretower, Powys, Wales

- Tretower, Powys, Wales
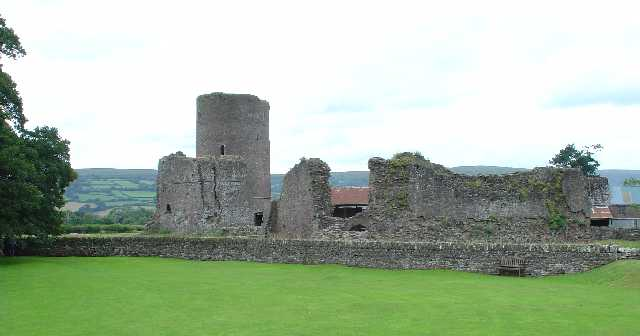
- Tretower Castle

Site information
- Owner: Cadw
- Condition: Ruined

Location
- Coordinates: 51.8839°N 3.1861°W

Listed Building – Grade I

Tretower Castle (Welsh: Castell Tretŵr) is a Grade I-listed ruined castle in the village of Tretower in the county of Powys, Wales. It was built around the beginning of the twelfth century as a motte and bailey castle and this was probably replaced mid-century by a stone shell keep. The castle was enlarged in the early thirteenth century, but later fell into ruin.

== History ==
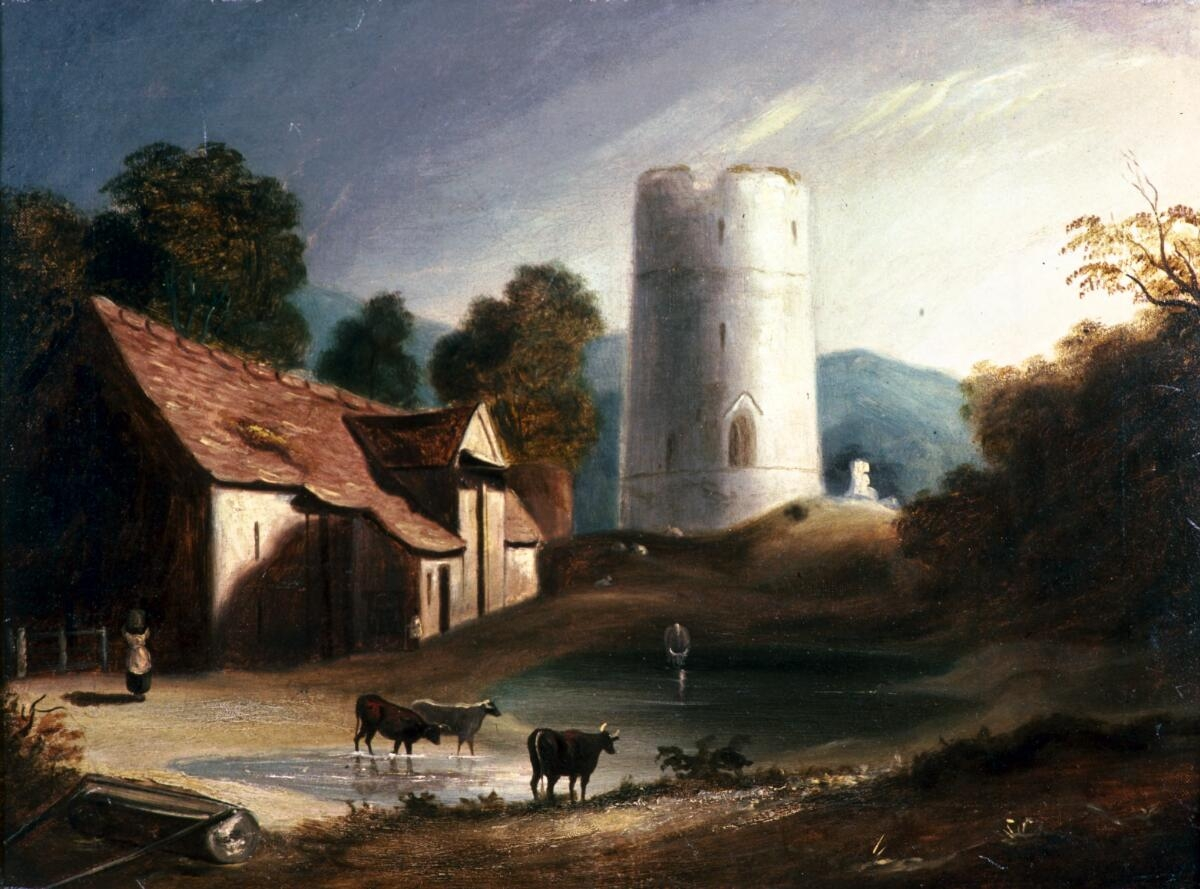
Tretower about 1820 by Henry Gastineau

Tretower (Welsh: Castell Tretŵr) was founded as a motte and bailey castle by Sir Miles Picard (Piegard), a follower of Bernard de Neufmarché. Probably around 1150, Picard's son, Roger Picard I, replaced the motte with a shell keep. By about 1230 a tall cylindrical keep was added to the inside of the shell keep, possibly by his great-grandson, Roger Picard II, and the space between was roofed over. At this time the earlier bailey was walled in stone and provided with cylindrical corner towers. In the early 14th century residential buildings were constructed away from the original fortifications forming today's Tretower Court. Over time the lords of Tretower favoured the more luxurious Court and the castle fell into disuse.

== Description of the castle ==
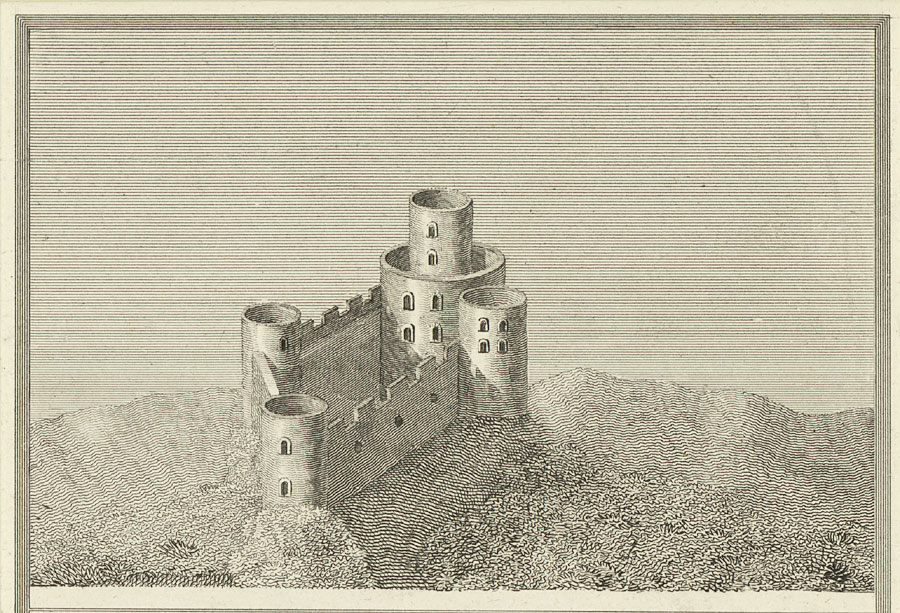
Tretower Castle, as engraved around 1800, showing an impression of its earlier and fullest extent

The castle is roughly triangular in plan, with the motte and keep assemblage occupying the western corner. The 12th century shell-keep is an irregular enclosure with a gate-tower on the line of approach from the bailey. In the centre of the shell stands the tall cylindrical 13th century keep. The keep is of three storeys, with an original entrance at first floor level, above a strong, slanted batter or talus. The top of the talus is marked by a decorative string-course of stone.

== See also ==
- Castles in Great Britain and Ireland
- List of castles in Wales

== Bibliography ==
- Sancha, Sheila (1991). The Castle Story. London: Collins. ISBN 0-00-196336-8.
