= Bredwardine =

Village in Herefordshire, England

Coordinates: 52.095°N 2.976°W

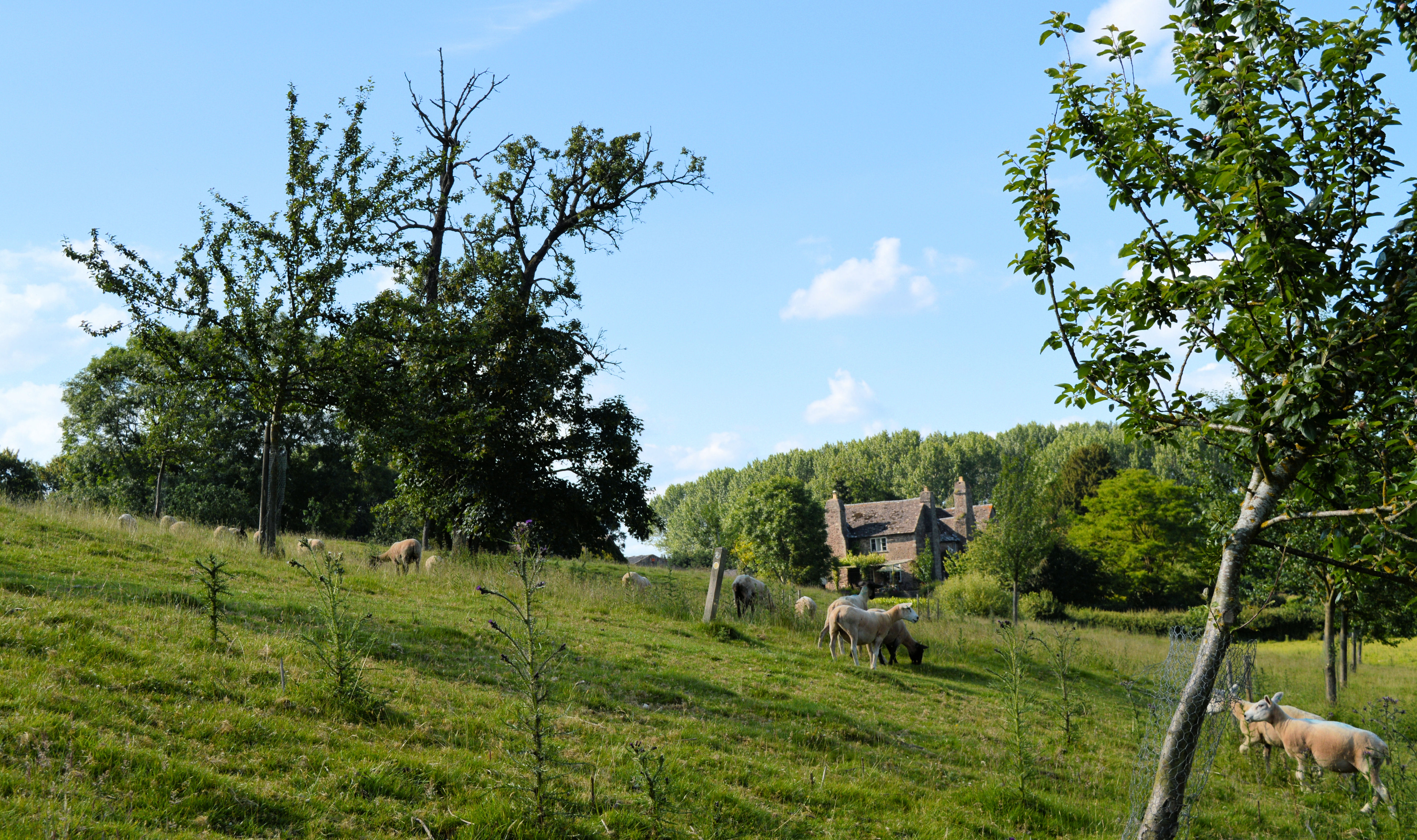
- Old Court, Bredwardine

- Location within Herefordshire
- OS grid reference: SO335445
- Unitary authority: Herefordshire
- Ceremonial county: Herefordshire
- Region: West Midlands
- Country: England
- Sovereign state: United Kingdom
- Post town: HEREFORD
- Postcode district: HR3
- Dialling code: 01981
- Police: West Mercia
- Fire: Hereford and Worcester
- Ambulance: West Midlands
- UK Parliament: Hereford and South Herefordshire

Bredwardine is a village and civil parish in the west of Herefordshire, England.

Significant parish landmarks include a brick bridge over the River Wye, the historic Red Lion late 17th-century coaching inn, St Andrew's Church, and the site of Bredwardine Castle. The Wye Valley Walk passes through the village which is on the B4352 road.

The name is pronounced to rhyme with "dine", and means "Brid's farm".

Notable people associated with Bredwardine include Rowland Vaughan (1559–1629), the landowner and pioneer of irrigation, who was born here; Sir Charles Thomas Newton (1816–1894), the archaeologist, who was raised in Bredwardine, where his father was vicar; and Francis Kilvert (1840–1879), the diarist and cleric who was vicar of Bredwardine from late 1877 until his death on 23 September 1879.
