= Tretower Court =

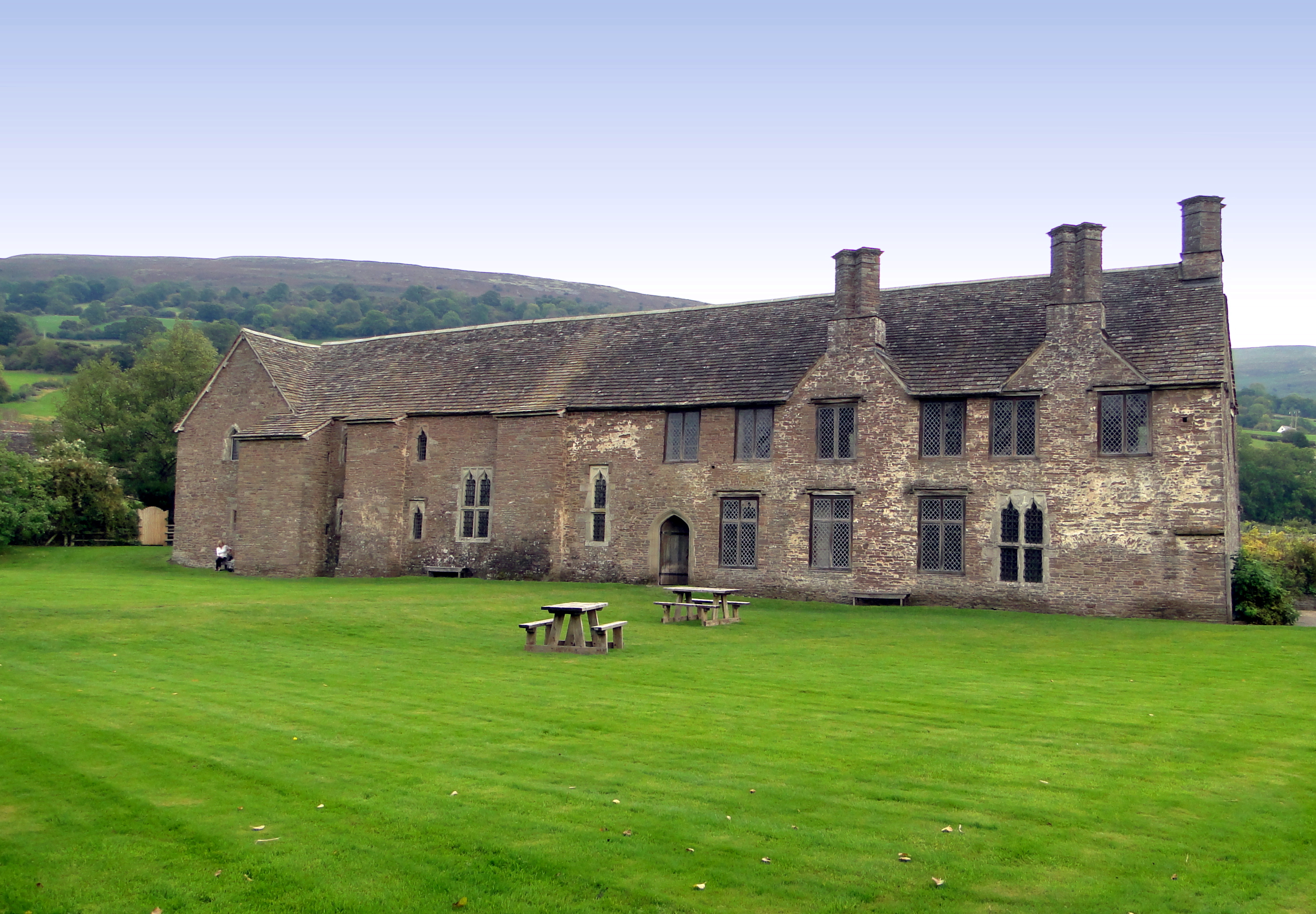
- The west range of Tretower Court

- Museum location in Powys, Wales
- Location: Tretower, Powys, Wales
- Coordinates: 51.8833°N 3.1843°W
- Type: Historic house museum
- Owner: Cadw
- Website: Tretower Court and Castle

Tretower Court (Welsh: Llys Tre-tŵr) is a medieval fortified manor house in Wales, situated in the village of Tretower, near Crickhowell in modern-day Powys, previously within the historical county of Brecknockshire (Breconshire).

== Local and national importance ==
The Court evolved from the adjacent Tretower Castle site and is a very rare example of its type, in that it shows the way in which a castle gradually developed into another significant type of medieval building, the fortified manor house or defended house. It is also a rare survival, escaping destruction in wars or conflicts, partial damage or slighting, for example during the English Civil War, and total redevelopment over time.

== Construction ==
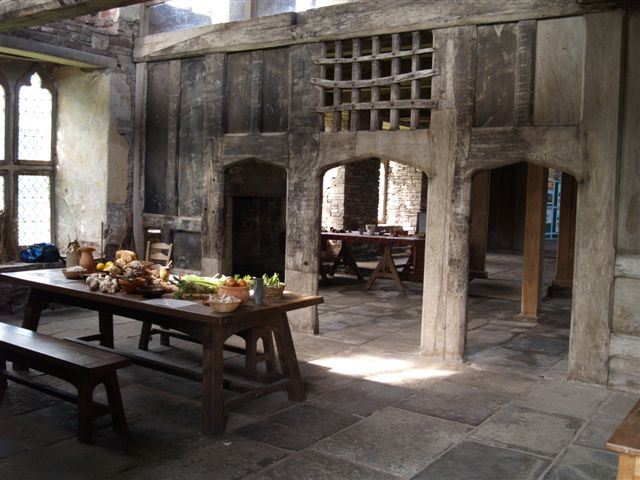
Tretower Court, interior

The initial construction of Tretower Court dates from the early years of the 14th century, when the castle site was also still in use. The earliest part of Tretower Court is the north range. The masonry of the walls, the internal fireplaces, the windows and the projecting latrine tower all indicate a date maybe as early as 1300. The 14th-century building consisted of a central ground floor hall open to its high roof, a solar or private bedchamber and a private living room. The hall probably served as a local court for paying fines and tithes. The west range was also 14th century.

== Owain Glyndŵr ==
In the early 15th century during the Owain Glyndŵr revolt in Wales against the new King Henry IV the building was under a very real threat from Welsh forces. Tretower Castle was listed as a defensible stronghold for the King in 1404 and under Sir James Berkeley successfully held off an attack. Presumably this was directed at Tretower Castle and the Court escaped serious damage.

The same year an English force led by Richard Beauchamp, Earl of Warwick fought a Welsh army of Owain Glyndŵr at the Battle of Mynydd Cwmdu nearby, almost capturing Glyndŵr himself and capturing his banner or standard. The Welsh forces retreated down the valley of the River Usk but laid an ambush for the pursuing English and engaged them in a skirmish below Craig-y-Dorth hill near Mitchel Troy, where the large fields are still referred to as Upper and Lower Battlefield. The English army was chased to the walls of Monmouth town. According to the Annals of Owain Glyn Dwr, "Here the more part of the English were slain and they were chased up to the town gate [of Monmouth]".

Less than a decade later the Court was the local meeting point from which the local contingent of Welsh archers left for service in France under King Henry V and contributed to the English victory at Agincourt.

== Development under the Vaughan family ==
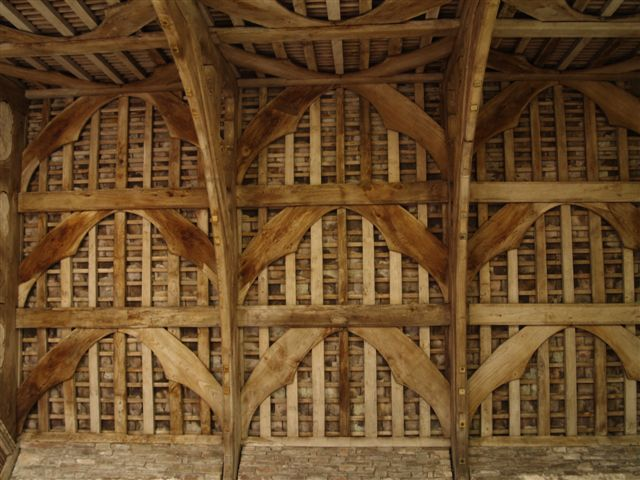
Tretower Court, roof beams

In early times the castle was held by the Picard (Pychard) family who gained extensive lands in Herefordshire for assisting William the Conqueror. Members of the family were Sheriffs of Hereford and married into several great landed families.

About 1450 the property was given to Sir Roger Vaughan by Sir William Herbert, the Earl of Pembroke and his half-brother. Sir William Herbert was the previous owner of the Court and Tretower Castle and the manor. The property was to remain in the hands of successive generations of Vaughans for all of its heyday.

Sir Roger Vaughan was to become the richest Commoner in Wales at the height of his career and he immediately set about refurbishing and developing Tretower Court into one befitting a prosperous man and leaving us the building that broadly speaking we see today.

He modernised the north range, inserting a floor above the hall, turning the block into a two-storey building. The lower storey seems to have served as storerooms, with a kitchen at its west end. He also added a new west range, immediately doubling the accommodation available, building a brand new hall, solar and upper rooms.

Sir Roger Vaughan was on the Yorkist side in the Wars of the Roses in the mid 15th century, fighting at the Battle of Mortimer's Cross in 1461, and leading Owain Tudor to his execution at Hereford following the battle. He quelled a rising in Carmarthenshire in 1465 and was soon after knighted. In 1471 he pursued Jasper Tudor following the Battle of Tewkesbury but Tudor captured him instead and he was beheaded at Chepstow Castle.

Sir Roger Vaughan's son and heir, Sir Thomas Vaughan, continued to develop the Court further during the last quarter of the 15th Century with the addition of the battlemented wall, wall walks and gatehouse, thus enclosing the courtyard.

Subsequent improvements were added in 1630 under Charles Vaughan, a sheriff of Brecknock in 1622 and 1636, adding cellars, a new stair, and an alternative entrance.

The Court passed to his son Edward Vaughan but he died without issue, the estate passing to his sister, Charles' daughter, Margaret of Maes-y-Gwartha, married to a Thomas Morgan. The Court then passed through a few more generations without any further improvements, either to the fabric or the fortunes of the residents.

== Decline and neglect ==
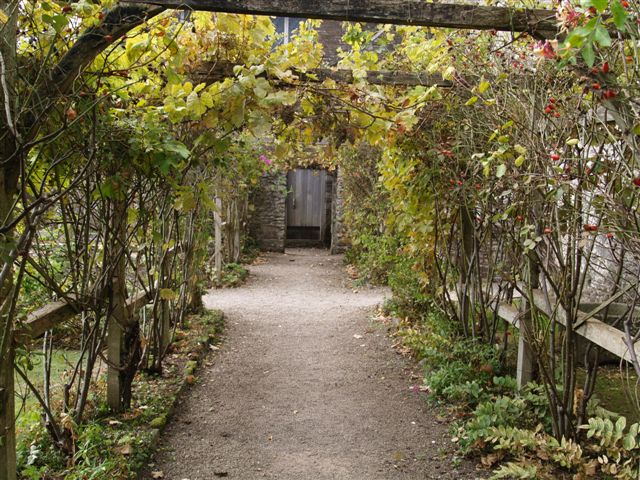
Tretower Court, gardens

The property was sold in 1783 as the Vaughan family decided to take up occupancy at another of their properties following a marriage and Tretower Court passed out of Vaughan hands to a series of new tenants and over time some previously residential rooms were adapted as stores, barns and then even used by animals, part even becoming a piggery. The building was not maintained to the previous standards and by the early years of the 20th century the building was in danger of collapse, the roof in particular being vulnerable. What maintenance had taken place was piecemeal and concealed the origin, age and value of the medieval structure.

== Rescue and renovation ==
In 1929 the Brecknock Society made a successful appeal for the government to purchase the building. In the 1930s it was saved and restored for the nation, and is now in the care of Cadw, Welsh Historic Monuments.

The Court is now open to the public and a guided audio tour is available, inclusive in the nominal entrance fee. Events and interpretive reenactments are often held at the Court in season. Parts of the building are available for wedding ceremonies.

It was once filmed in 2007 for The Sarah Jane Adventures episode Eye of the Gorgon.

== See also ==
- List of gardens in Wales
