= Dafydd Gam =

Welsh warrior (1380–1415)

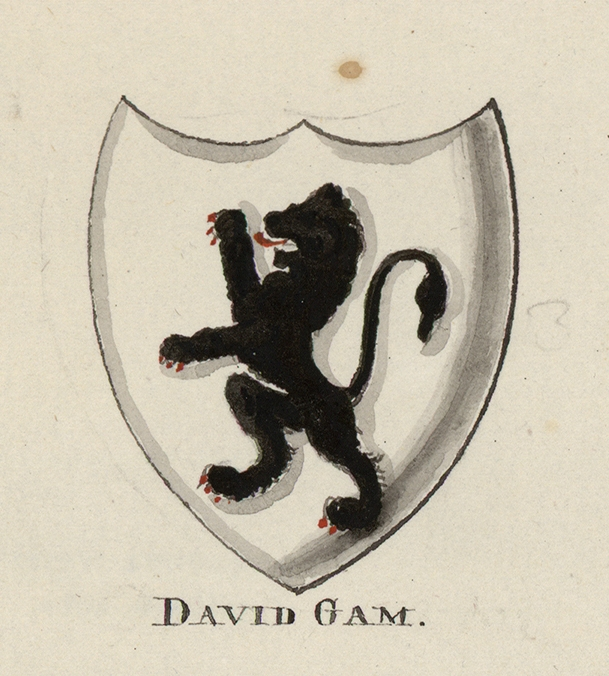
- Sir Dafydd Gam's coat of arms; from an extra-illustrated set of A tour in Wales by Thomas Pennant in the National Library of Wales
- Born: Dafydd ap Llewelyn ap Hywel c. 1380
- Died: 25 October 1415 (aged 34–35); Azincourt, France
- Children: Gwladys Gam
- Relatives: William Herbert (grandson)
- Military career
- Allegiance: Henry V, King of England
- Conflicts: Glyndŵr rebellion; Battle of Pwll Melyn; Hundred Years' War; Battle of Agincourt †

Dafydd ap Llewelyn ap Hywel (c. 1380 – 25 October 1415), better known as Dafydd Gam, anglicized to David or Davy Gam, was a Welsh warrior, and opponent of Owain Glyndŵr. He died at the Battle of Agincourt fighting for Henry V, King of England in that victory against the French.

The epithet "Gam" is a soft-mutated form of the Welsh word "cam" (one-eyed, cross-eyed). As the University of Wales Dictionary notes, "according to tradition, Syr Dafydd Gam (Dafydd ap Llewelyn ap Hywel Fychan) was one-eyed or cross-eyed". Regarded as a traitor to Wales by some and as a hero by others; his reputation has waxed and waned with those of his enemy Owain Glyndŵr and his ally King Henry V.

== Biography ==
=== Descent ===
Dafydd Gam was a member of one of the most prominent Welsh families in Breconshire (though the county did not exist in Dafydd's time). His recent pedigree was 'Dafydd Gam ap Llywelyn ap Hywel Fychan ap Hywel ap Einion Sais', but beyond that the family claimed an ancient Welsh lineage going back to the Kings of Brycheiniog (specifically, from Bleddyn ap Maenarch, the king whom Bernard de Neufmarché supposedly displaced). Dafydd Gam was the grandson of Hywel Fychan, who held the manor of Parc Llettis near Llanover in Monmouthshire near Abergavenny, and was fourth in descent from Einion Sais who held a castle at Pen Pont on the River Usk near Brecon and who had served at both the Battle of Crecy and the Battle of Poitiers. Their power base had developed mainly as consistently loyal supporters of the de Bohun family, who were both earls of Hereford and Marcher Lords of Brecknock from the 13th century onwards. Dafydd Gam's father, Llywelyn ap Hywel, purchased the estate of Penywaun near Brecon, and Dafydd is thought to have been born there. His family was described as "a striking example of a native family that flourished under the rule of an English aristocratic family." Under Llywelyn ap Hywel, the family's traditional loyalty was transferred to the new Lord of Brecknock, Henry Bolingbroke, who had married Mary de Bohun in the 1380s. Some say Dafydd was previously in service to Henry's father John of Gaunt and, having killed a rival in Brecon High Street, had to leave Wales temporarily.

=== Glyndŵr rebellion ===
Dafydd Gam was certainly being paid the substantial annuity of 40 marks by Henry's estate in 1399, even before Bolingbroke became King, and later he and his brothers were described as King's esquires. It seems likely they were prominent partisans of Henry in South East Wales as he gathered support for his overthrow of Richard II around 1399.

When the Glyndŵr rebellion broke out in 1400, the family's traditional loyalty to their liege lord remained unshaken and they played a leading role in opposition to the rebellion in the area. Their lands in and around Brecon became a target for Glyndŵr's attacks, and were extensively damaged as early as 1402–1403. The Scottish chronicler Walter Bower names Dafydd as a leader in the crushing defeat of Glyndŵr's men at the Battle of Pwll Melyn near Usk on 5 May 1405. After the battle, 300 of Glyndŵr's men were executed and his son, Gruffudd ab Owain Glyndŵr, was captured. Gam's local knowledge might well have played a part in the Crown's victory here and in other battles like that at Grosmont around the same time, and may have won over local Welshmen to fight against Glyndŵr. The family's loyalty was rewarded with the gift of some of Glyndŵrs' supporters' confiscated estates in Cardiganshire. In 1412 Dafydd Gam was captured by Glyndŵr's men and estimates of the amount paid as his ransom recorded at the time, range from 200 to 700 marks, a large amount. That it was paid directly and speedily from the King's estates in Wales indicates the esteem in which Gam was held by Henry. Glyndŵr had made Gam swear an oath to never bear arms against him again or oppose him in any other way. On his release Gam told King Henry of Glyndŵr's whereabouts and attacked Glyndwr's men. Glyndŵr had Gam's Brecon estates attacked and burned in retaliation and his Brecon house was razed.

=== Agincourt ===
Given King Henry V's leadership in the campaign against Glyndŵr, Dafydd would have known the new king crowned in 1413 personally, and perhaps even fought alongside him. Records show that Dafydd Gam served with three-foot archers in the Battle of Agincourt campaign. His death in the battle was a fact noted in several contemporary chronicles. There is much controversy about whether Gam was knighted at the battle. His example shows that Welshmen continued to fight in the English army after the Glyndŵr rebellion.

Stories of Gam's exploits at the Battle of Agincourt in which he saved Henry V's life, and that he was knighted either posthumously or as he was dying on the field of victory at Agincourt by King Henry V as a result, are not vouched for in contemporary sources and have thus been discounted by many historians. According to the legend the intervention occurred during the counter-charge of John I, Duke of Alençon, which certainly is historical, leading to the wounding of Humphrey, Duke of Gloucester, and Henry fighting hand-to-hand in the late stage of the battle. The King was hard pressed and the Duke of Alençon supposedly cut an ornament from Henry's crown with a sword blow. Then a group of Welsh knights in the king's bodyguard led by Dafydd Gam intervened to save Henry's life, only for some to be killed in doing so, including Dafydd himself, and his son in law Sir Roger Vaughan. One of those supposedly involved in this exploit was Sir William ap Thomas, who survived the battle. Some accounts claim Dafydd slew the Duke of Alençon himself. By the Tudor period, this story was frequently being told in histories of the campaign and by the descendants of those involved, and it was widely accepted as the truth at that time. Although both Dafydd and Vaughan did die in the battle, the exact circumstances of their deaths are unknown. Dafydd's reputation was still very much alive in 19th-century Wales. George Borrow said of him, "... where he achieved that glory which will for ever bloom, dying, covered with wounds, on the field of Agincourt after saving the life of the king, to whom in the dreadest and most critical moment of the fight he stuck closer than a brother". Juliet Barker, while not accepting the rest of the legend, claims in her history of Agincourt that "Llewelyn was knighted on the field, only to fall in the battle." She also says that Dafydd's Welsh comrade, and posthumous son-in-law, Sir William ap Thomas may have been knighted at the battle.

=== Descendants ===
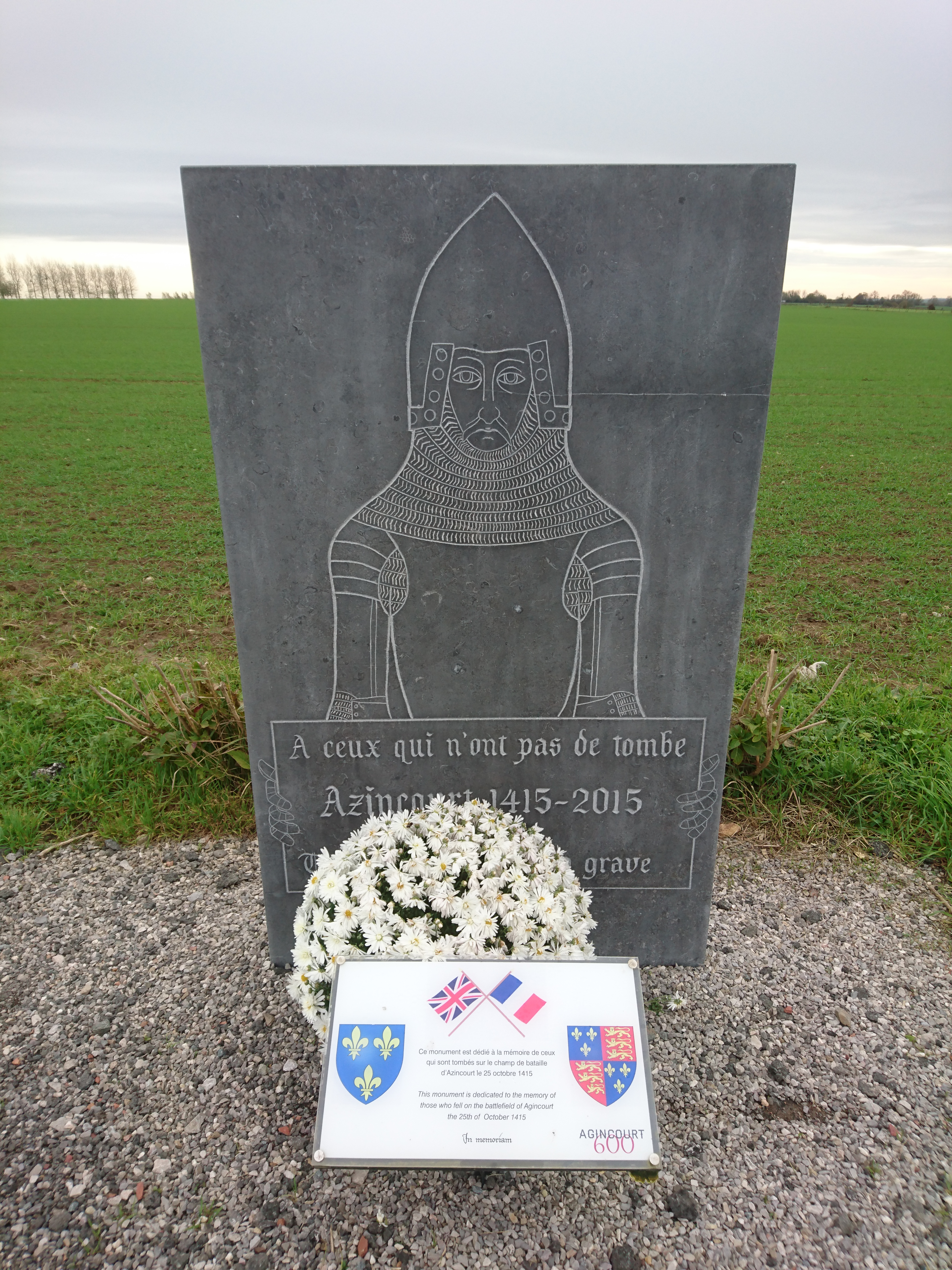
Agincourt battlefield and memorial

Some of Dafydd's descendants, who adopted the surname 'Games' to mark their connection to him, remained one of the most powerful families in the Breconshire area until Stuart times. They were noted for their support for Welsh bards. His daughter Gwladys ferch Dafydd Gam, "Seren y Fenni" ("Star of Abergavenny"), made two good marriages, the first to Sir Roger Vaughan, who also died at Agincourt. Her second was to Sir William ap Thomas of Raglan Castle who survived the battle. Her son became the extremely powerful William Herbert, 1st Earl of Pembroke (1423-1469) and took the surname Herbert, later to become one of the best known names in the nobility. All these noble connections ensured Dafydd Gam's name remained a celebrated one.

== Legacy ==
Like his opponent Glyndŵr, Dafydd has gained a sheen of legend, and many stories about him are late oral traditions, folklore and family legends of uncertain reliability. Chief amongst them is the tale that he tried to assassinate Glyndŵr at his parliament at Machynlleth in 1404. According to local lore, when the attempt failed, he was imprisoned in the Royal House, which survives. The legends differ on his subsequent fate. Some claim that Glyndŵr released Gam soon after the Parliament, despite his refusal to submit, a decision that Glyndŵr would later regret. Others say that he was imprisoned for many years – but these are contradicted by his apparent participation in the Battle of Pwll Melyn in 1405. The stories concerning his rivalry with Glyndŵr include satirical englynion in Welsh, supposedly composed by Glyndŵr himself about his rival after he had burnt his house to the ground. Whatever the truth of these tales, there seems no doubt that Glyndŵr and his men, and popular tradition, regarded Dafydd as one of the chief enemies of the rebellion.

George Borrow describes Dafydd in Wild Wales (1862) as follows: "He was small of stature and deformed in person, though possessed of great strength. He was very sensitive of injury, though quite as alive to kindness; a thorough-going enemy and a thorough-going friend."

Dafydd is a key character in John Cowper Powys's novel Owen Glendower (1941).

By the Tudor period, Dafydd appears to have typified the loyal and valiant Welshman. He is better known in England as "Davy Gam", under which name he is mentioned briefly in Shakespeare's Henry V (4.8.102) as the last name in the short list of the noble fallen read out to King Henry. His influence on the play may have been greater still: in the words of the Oxford Dictionary of National Biography, Dafydd "may indeed, as has been suggested, be the model for Shakespeare's Fluellen, the archetypal Welshman". The theory dates back to at least 1812, when it was said: "There can be little doubt but that Shakspeare, in his burlesque character of Fluellen, intended David Gam."

Fluellen: "If your Majesty is remembered of it, the Welshmen did good service in a garden where leeks did grow, wearing leeks in their Monmouth caps, which your Majesty knows, to this hour is an honourable badge of the service, and I do believe, your Majesty takes no scorn to wear the leek upon Saint Tavy's day."
King Henry: "I wear it for a memorable honour; for I am Welsh, you know, good my countryman."

=== Monmouthshire traditions ===
According to local legend, one of Dafydd's homes was a moated manor house at Hen Gwrt (of which only the moat survives), close to the village of Llantilio Crossenny, near Abergavenny, Monmouthshire. He is commemorated in a stained glass window, of unknown date, in the north wall of Llantilio Crossenny church. The Latin inscription reads in translation: "David Gam, golden haired knight, Lord of the manor of Llantilio Crossenny, killed on the field of Agincourt 1415".
