= William ap Thomas =

Welsh noble (died 1445)

Sir William ap Thomas
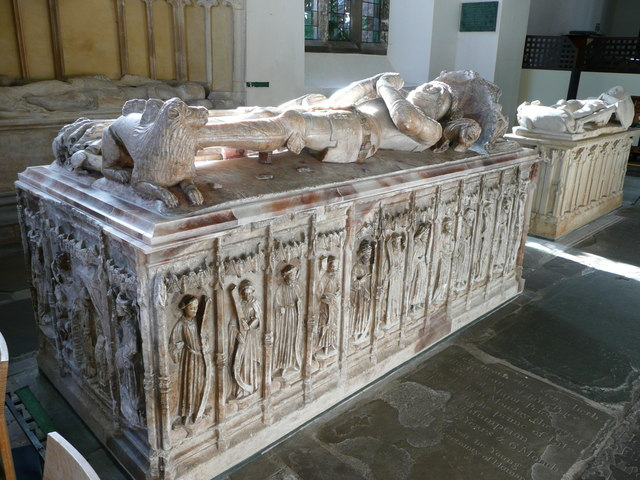
- The tomb of William ap Thomas
- Died: 1445; London
- Resting place: Abergavenny Priory, Abergavenny
- Occupations: Politician, Knight, Courtier
- Title: Sir
- Spouse(s): Elizabeth Bluet; Gwladys ferch Dafydd Gam
- Children: 4 (including William Herbert, 1st Earl of Pembroke)
- Parent(s): Sir Thomas ap Gwyllym (died 1438); Maud Morley

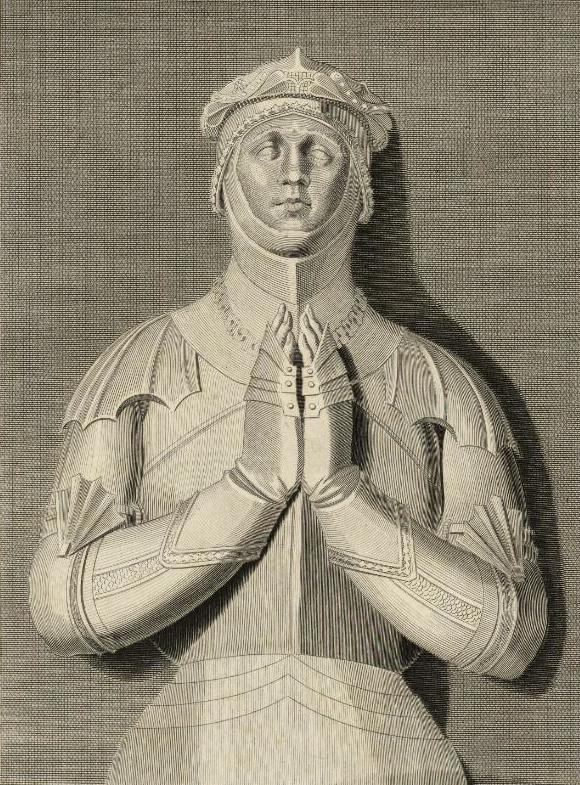
Monumental effigy of Sir William ap Thomas.

Sir William ap Thomas (died 1445) was a Welsh nobleman, politician, knight, and courtier. He was a member of the Welsh gentry family that came to be known as the Herbert family through his son William Herbert, 1st Earl of Pembroke (8th creation) and is the agnatic ancestor, via an illegitimate descendant of the 1st Earl of the 8th creation, of the current Herbert family of the Earl of Pembroke and Montgomery, and also of the Herbert Earl of Carnarvon.

William ap Thomas purchased the manor and lordship of Raglan (including the castle at Raglan) in 1430 for 1000 marks from his step-son, James Berkeley (1394-1463), Knt., 6th Lord Berkeley, son of William's wife, Elizabeth Bluet, and her second husband, Sir James Berkeley (1353-1405). No children came of the William ap Thomas and Elizabeth Bluet marriage. The castle was greatly expanded by William and his son, William Herbert, into the well-fortified Raglan Castle, one of the finest late medieval Welsh castles.

William served King Henry V of England during his first French campaign and in numerous subsequent capacities and was knighted in 1426.

== Early life ==
William ap Thomas was the son of Sir Thomas ap Gwyllym, Knt (d. 1438) of Perth-hir House and Maud Morley, daughter and co-heir of Sir John Morley of Llansantffraed. In 1400 Thomas and his wife Maud inherited Llansantffraed Court, the country seat and estate of Sir John Morley. Llansantffraed Court was located approximately 2 miles (3.2 km) west of the town of Raglan and Raglan Castle, near Clytha and Abergavenny, Wales. (Note: Sir Thomas is buried in the church where a plaque records his death and that of his successors until 1624. After Sir Thomas' death, Llansantffraed Court passed through William's brother, Philip. In 1449 Philip was given 'advowson of the living' by Sir Edward Nevill, 3rd Baron Abergavenny, and Elizabeth de Beauchamp, Lady of Abergavenny. Llansantffraed Court was held by Philip's descendants in an unbroken line until the 17th century.)

Later Herbert family pedigrees tracing the family's ancestry to a natural son of Henry I of England have been largely discounted as forgeries, and the dynasty is now considered to be of native Welsh origin, as a cadet branch of the pre-Norman Royal Family of the Kingdom of Gwent.

The second earl of the tenth creation quartered the ancient royal arms of Gwent in the 1620 heraldic visitation, which supports this claim.

== The Blue Knight of Gwent ==
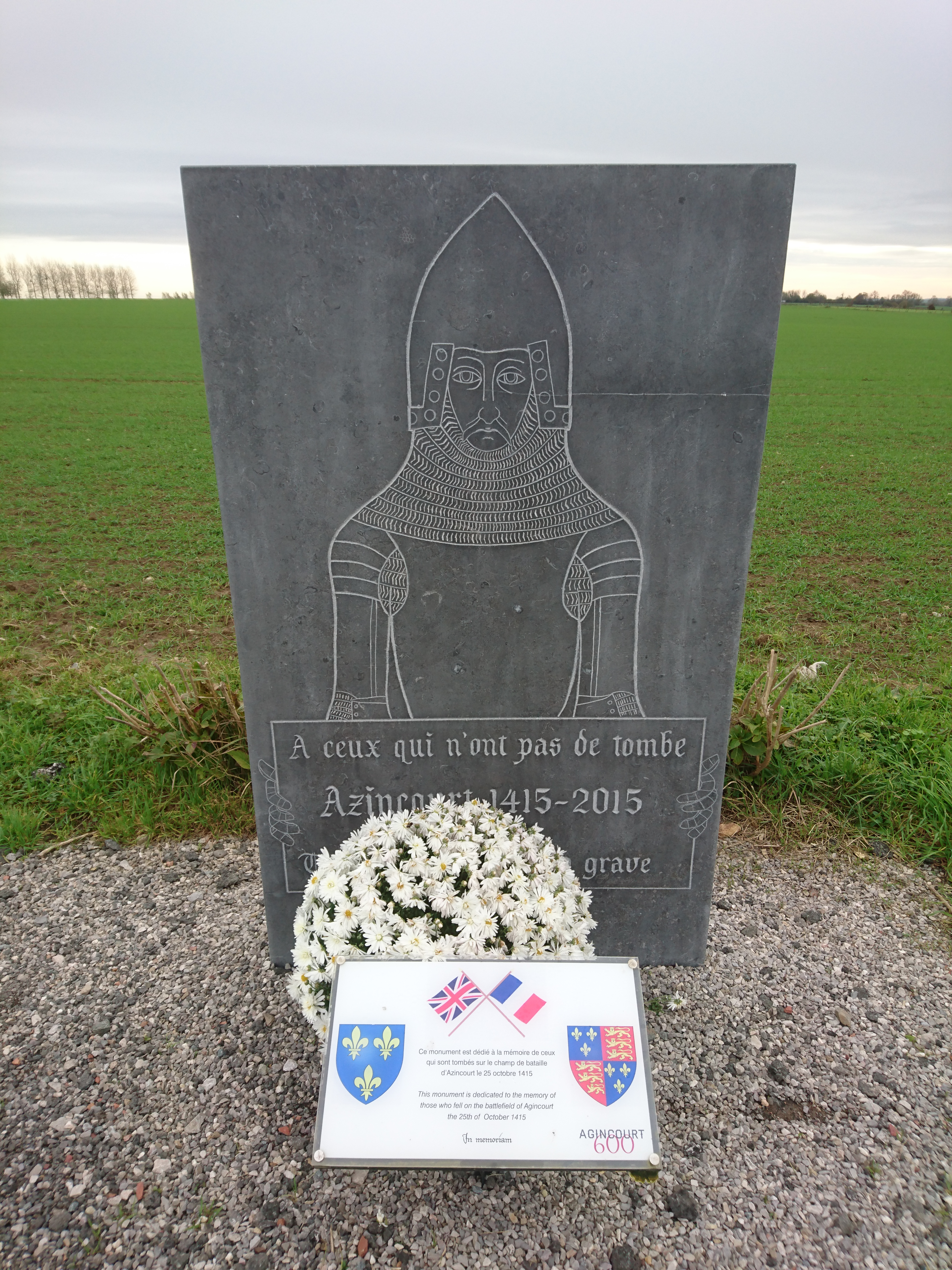
Agincourt battlefield site and memorial.

Sir William was thought by antiquarians to have fought at the Battle of Agincourt and Joseph Edmondson (died 1786) states that Sir William was made knight banneret on the battlefield by Henry V. More recent research of the rolls, however, of those who went to France has failed to reveal his name. and a primary source for Edmondson's assertion has not been found. It is possible he was in the entourage of his future wife's father Davy Gam, who fell at Agincourt. Primary sources exist to show that he was made a Knight Bachelor by Henry VI in 1426; and—as Octavius Morgan (died 1888) pointed out—he could not have been knighted twice. He became known to his compatriots as "Y marchog glas o Went" (the Blue Knight of Gwent), because of the colour of his armour.

William gradually began to establish himself as a person of consequence in South Wales, and held the following positions:

- William was Steward of the Lordship of Abergavenny by 1421.
- He was appointed High Sheriff of Cardiganshire and Carmarthenshire in 1435.
- In 1440, he was appointed the position as High Sheriff of Glamorgan.
- In 1442 or 1443, William became Chief Steward of Richard Plantagenet, 3rd Duke of York's estates in Wales.
- Was a member of the Duke of York's military council.

While William played an active role for the Duke of York, his sphere of influence was generally limited to South Wales.

== Death and burial ==
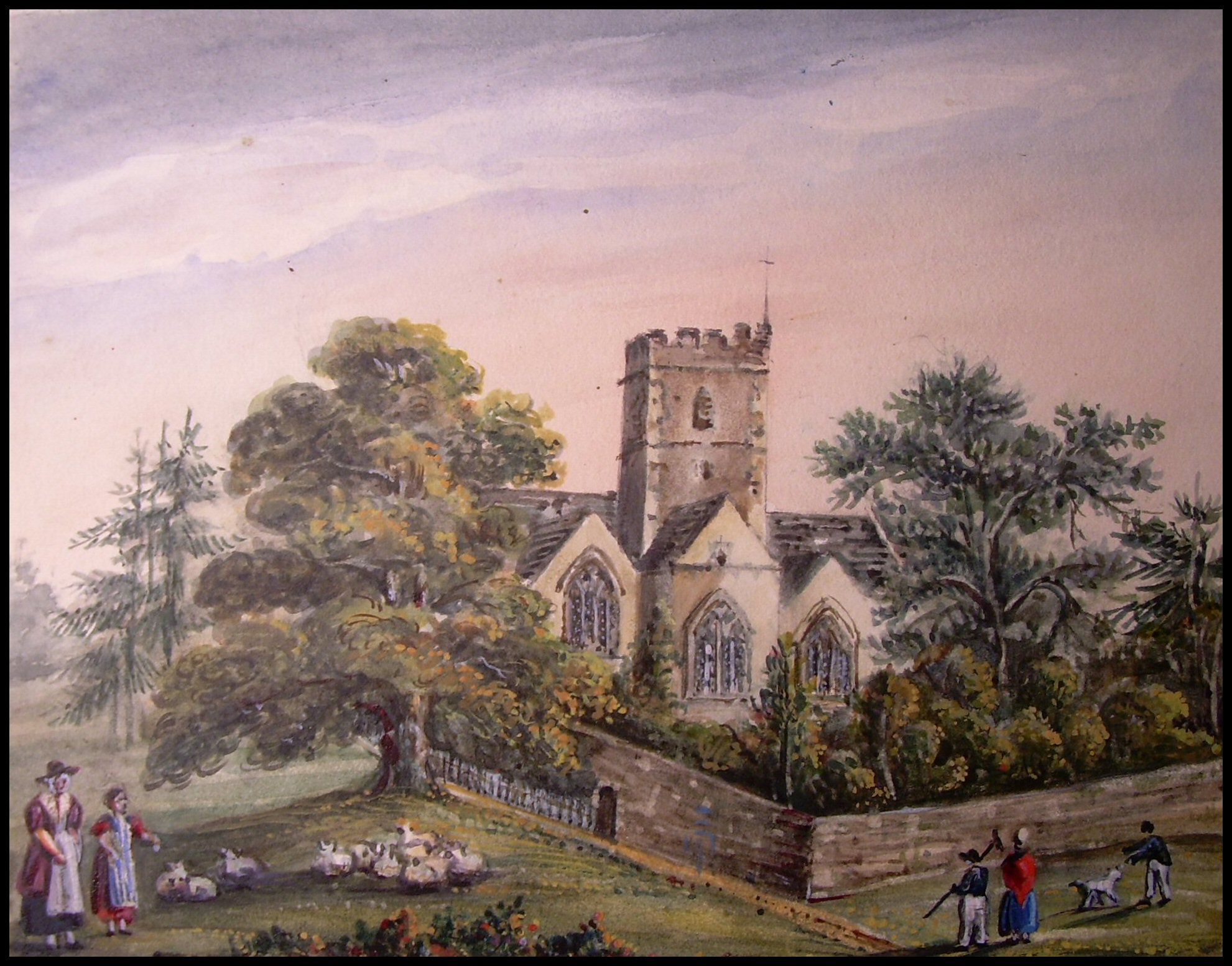
Gwladys and William ap Thomas were patrons of Abergavenny Priory, where they were both buried

William ap Thomas died in London in 1445 and his body was brought back to Wales. Gwladys and her husband William ap Thomas were patrons of Abergavenny Priory where they were both buried; their alabaster tomb and effigies can still be seen in the church of St Mary's.

== Family ==
William married first in 1406 Elizabeth (died 1420), (Note: Elizabeth is also known as Isabel Bluet (also spelled Bloet)) the daughter of Sir John Bluet of Raglan manor and widow of Sir James Berkeley. Elizabeth, "the lady of Raggeland", inherited Raglan Castle with her husband James Berkeley, who later died in 1405 or 1406. Before marrying Berkeley she had married and become the widow of Sir Bartholomew Picot. Elizabeth's third marriage, to William, was childless.

William married secondly heiress Gwladys ferch Dafydd Gam (died 1454), described by Welsh poet Lewys Glyn Cothi as 'The Star of Abergavenny' for her beauty. She was the daughter of Sir Dafydd Gam and the widow of Sir Roger Vaughan of Bredwardine. All three men had been part of the Welsh contingent that fought with King Henry V of England in France, including the Battle of Agincourt.

William and Gwladys had children:

- William Herbert, 1st Earl of Pembroke (1423–1469) took the surname Herbert. William's allegiance to Richard, Duke of York, and Richard Neville, 16th Earl of Warwick, branded him Edward IV's Welsh "master-lock". He was the first full-blooded Welshman to enter the English peerage and he was knighted in 1452. He married Anne Devereux, daughter of Sir Walter Devereux, in 1449, and they had issue. The modern Herbert family that holds the earldoms of Pembroke, Montgomery, and Carnarvon, are descended from an illegitimate son of this William Herbert.
- Sir Richard Herbert of Coldbrook, near Abergavenny; died at the Battle of Edgcote in 1469.
- Elizabeth married Sir Henry Stradling (1423–1476), son of Sir Edward Stradling (d. c.1394) and Gwenllian Berkerolles, sister and co-heir of his neighbour, Sir Lawrence Berkerolles. Reversing alliances from the previous generation, Henry and his brothers-in-law were hostile to the Henry VI reign. Henry went on a pilgrimage to the Holy Land in 1476. Henry died on 31 August 1476 on his journey back to England and was buried at Famagusta, Cyprus. Thomas, Elizabeth and Henry's young son, died on 8 September 1480.
- Margaret married Sir Henry Wogan, steward and treasurer of the Earldom of Pembroke, tasked with securing war material for the defence of Pembroke Castle. Henry and his father, John Wogan of Picton, witnessed an act of Bishop Benedict in 1418. Their son, Sir John Wogan, was killed at the Battle of Edgcote in 1465, fighting by the side of his uncle, William Herbert, Earl of Pembroke.

Other children less consistently attributed to Gwladys and William include: Maud, Olivia, Elizabeth (who married Welsh country gentlemen, John ab Gwilym), and Thomas Herbert.

The Cornish family of Thomas (Thomas of Lelant, Thomas of Crowan, Thomas of Tremayne, Thoms, and the Bosarvanes of St Just), all patrilineally descended from "Richard Thomas gent. of Wales" are acknowledged as legitimate agnatic descendants of William ap Thomas in the 1620 Visitation of Cornwall.

The Visitation records state "This coate of Pr pale nebule Ar. B. was ye coate armor of Sr Willm ap Thomas, from whom this familye chalengeth to be descended."

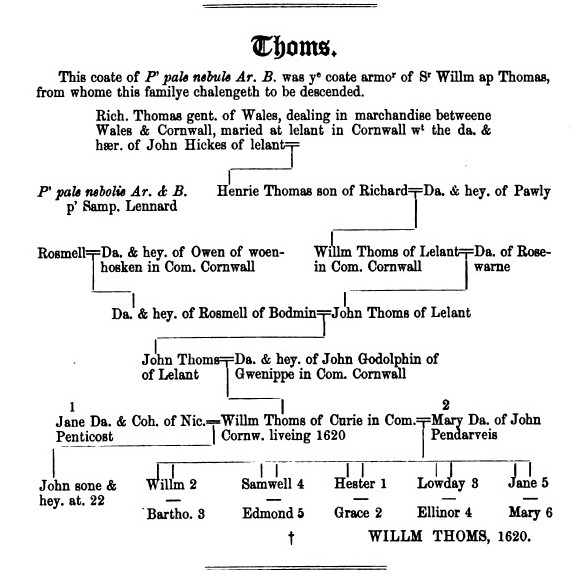
one of the entries for the Cornish Thomas family from the 1620 Visitation

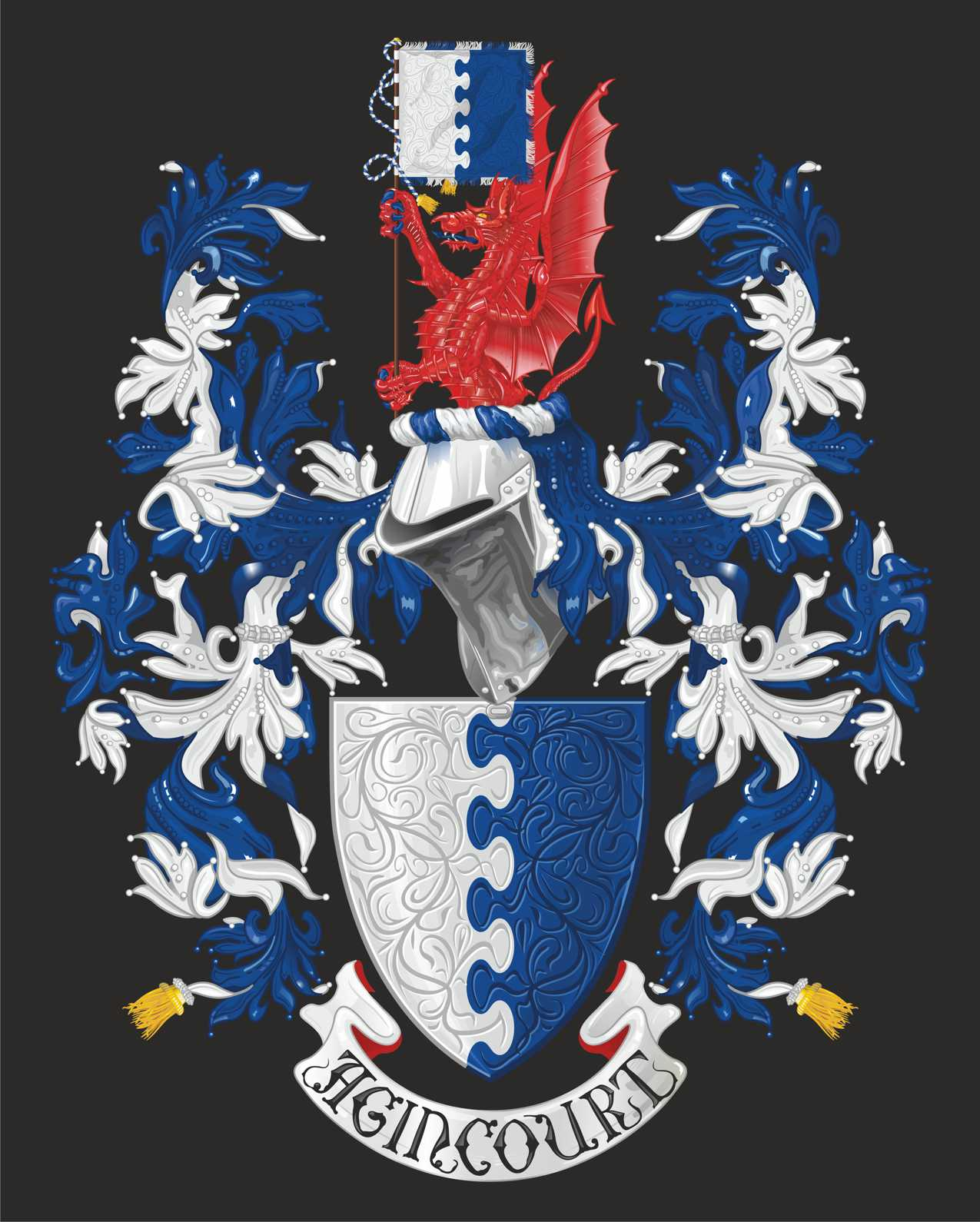
The Thomas armorial achievement as borne by the living descendants of the Rev. William Courtenay Thomas, himself an agnatic descendant of William ap Thomas.

Descendants of this family include Members of Parliament, such as John Thomas who sat in the 1555 Parliament for the Cornish borough of Mitchell, members of the clergy such as Methodist minister the Reverend William Courtenay Thomas and his descendants, and related pioneering families in Australia.

=== Raglan Castle ===
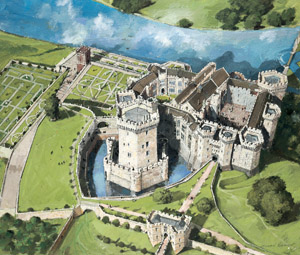
Reconstruction of Raglan Castle around 1620

When Sir John Bloet died, Raglan manor passed to Elizabeth Bloet and her husband James Berkeley. When William's wife Elizabeth died in 1420, Elizabeth's son Lord James Berkeley inherited Raglan Manor. William resided at Raglan manor as a tenant of his stepson until 1432 when he purchased the manor from Lord Berkeley.

Grandiose expansion for defence and comfort occurred between 1432 when William ap Thomas bought the manor and 1469 when his son, Sir William Herbert, was executed. Improvements by father and son included the twin-towered gatehouse, five storied Great Tower encircled by a moat, a self-contained fortress in its own right, South Gate, Pitched Stone Court, drawbridge and portcullis.

Thomas Churchyard praised Raglan Castle in his 16th-century poem, The Worthiness of Wales:

"The Earle of Penbroke that was created Earle by King Edward the four bult the Castell sumptuously at the first

Not farre from thence, a famous castle fine
That Raggland hight, stands moted almost round
Made of freestone, upright straight as line
Whose workmanship in beautie doth abound
The curious knots, wrought all with edged toole
The stately tower, that looks ore pond and poole
The fountaine trim, that runs both day and night
Doth yield in showe, a rare and noble sight"

Dafydd Llwyd proclaimed Raglan the castle with its "hundred rooms filled with festive fare, its hundred towers, parlours and doors, its hundred heaped-up fires of long-dried fuel, its hundred chimneys for men of high degree."
