= William Herbert, 1st Earl of Pembroke (died 1469) =

Welsh nobleman and politician

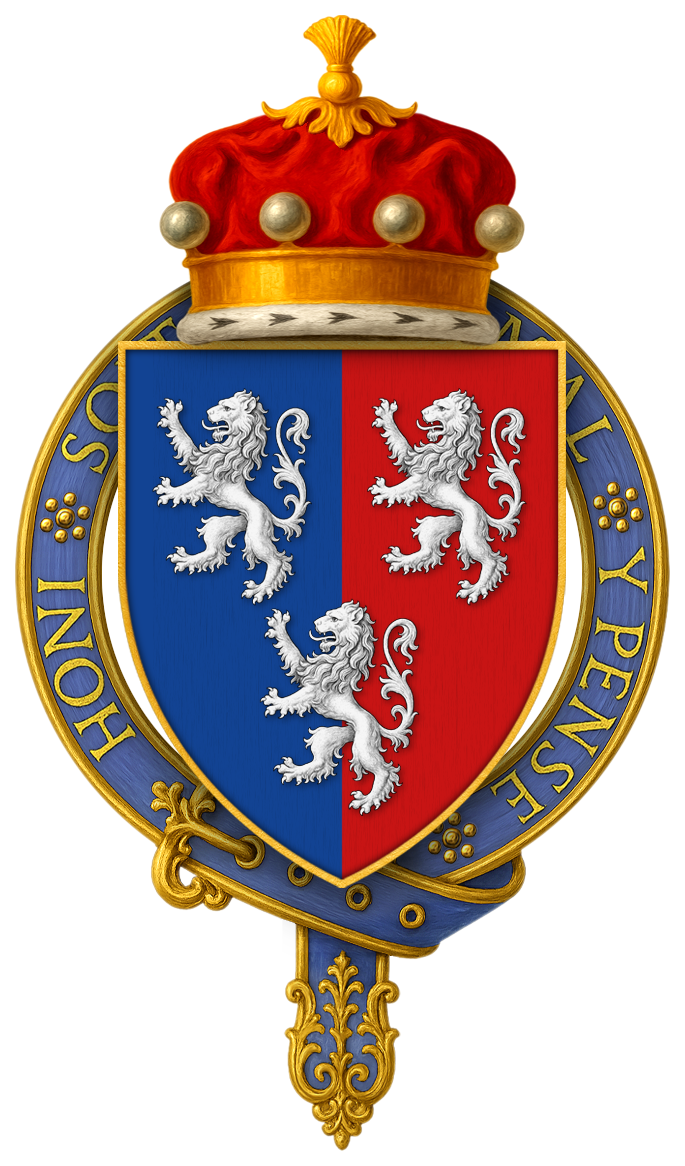
Arms of Sir William Herbert, 1st Baron Herbert, at the time of his installation in the Most Noble Order of the Garter: Per pale azure and gules, three lions rampant argent

William Herbert, 1st Earl of Pembroke KG (c. 1423 – 27 July 1469), known as "Black William", was a Welsh nobleman, soldier, politician, and courtier.

== Life ==
He was the son of William ap Thomas, founder of Raglan Castle, and Gwladys ferch Dafydd Gam, and grandson of Dafydd Gam, an adherent of King Henry V of England. His father had been an ally of Richard of York, and Herbert supported the Yorkist cause in the Wars of the Roses. In 1461 Herbert was rewarded by King Edward IV with the title Baron Herbert of Raglan (having assumed an English-style surname in place of the Welsh patronymic), and was invested as a Knight of the Garter.

Soon after the decisive Yorkist victory at the Battle of Towton in 1461, Herbert replaced Jasper Tudor as Earl of Pembroke which gave him control of Pembroke Castle – and with it, he gained the wardship of young Henry Tudor. However, he fell out with Lord Warwick "the Kingmaker" in 1469, when Warwick turned against the King. Herbert was denounced by Warwick and the Duke of Clarence as one of the king's "evil advisers". William and his brother Richard were executed by Warwick in Northampton, after the Battle of Edgcote, which took place in South Northamptonshire, near Banbury.

Herbert was succeeded by his son, William, but the earldom was surrendered in 1479. It was later revived for a grandson, another William Herbert, the son of Black William's illegitimate son, Sir Richard Herbert of Ewyas.

== Marriage and children ==
He married Anne Devereux, daughter of Walter Devereux, Lord Chancellor of Ireland, and Elizabeth Merbury. They had at least ten children:

- William Herbert, 2nd Earl of Pembroke (5 March 1451 – 16 July 1491).
- Sir Walter Herbert. (c. 1452 – 16 September 1507) Married Lady Anne Stafford, sister to the Duke of Buckingham.
- Sir George Herbert of St. Julians.
- Philip Herbert of Lanyhangel.
- Cecilie Herbert.
- Maud Herbert. Married Henry Percy, 4th Earl of Northumberland.
- Katherine Herbert. Married George Grey, 2nd Earl of Kent.
- Anne Herbert. Married John Grey, 1st Baron Grey of Powis, 9th Lord of Powys (died 1497).
- Isabel Herbert. Married Sir Thomas Cokesey.
- Margaret Herbert. Married first Thomas Talbot, 2nd Viscount Lisle, and secondly Sir Henry Bodrugan.

William had three illegitimate sons but the identities of their mothers are unconfirmed:

- Sir Richard Herbert of Ewyas. Father of William Herbert, 1st Earl of Pembroke (of the 10th creation). Probably son of Maud, daughter of Adam ap Howell Graunt (Gwynn).
- Sir George Herbert. The son of Frond verch Hoesgyn. Married Sybil Croft.
- Sir William Herbert of Troye. Son of Frond verch Hoesgyn. Married, secondly, Blanche Whitney (née Milborne). They had two sons.

== See also ==
- The White Queen (miniseries)

Peerage of England
New creation	Earl of Pembroke; 1468–1469	Succeeded by William Herbert
New creation	Baron Herbert; 1461–1469	Succeeded by William Herbert
