= Henry V of England =

King of England from 1413 to 1422

Henry V
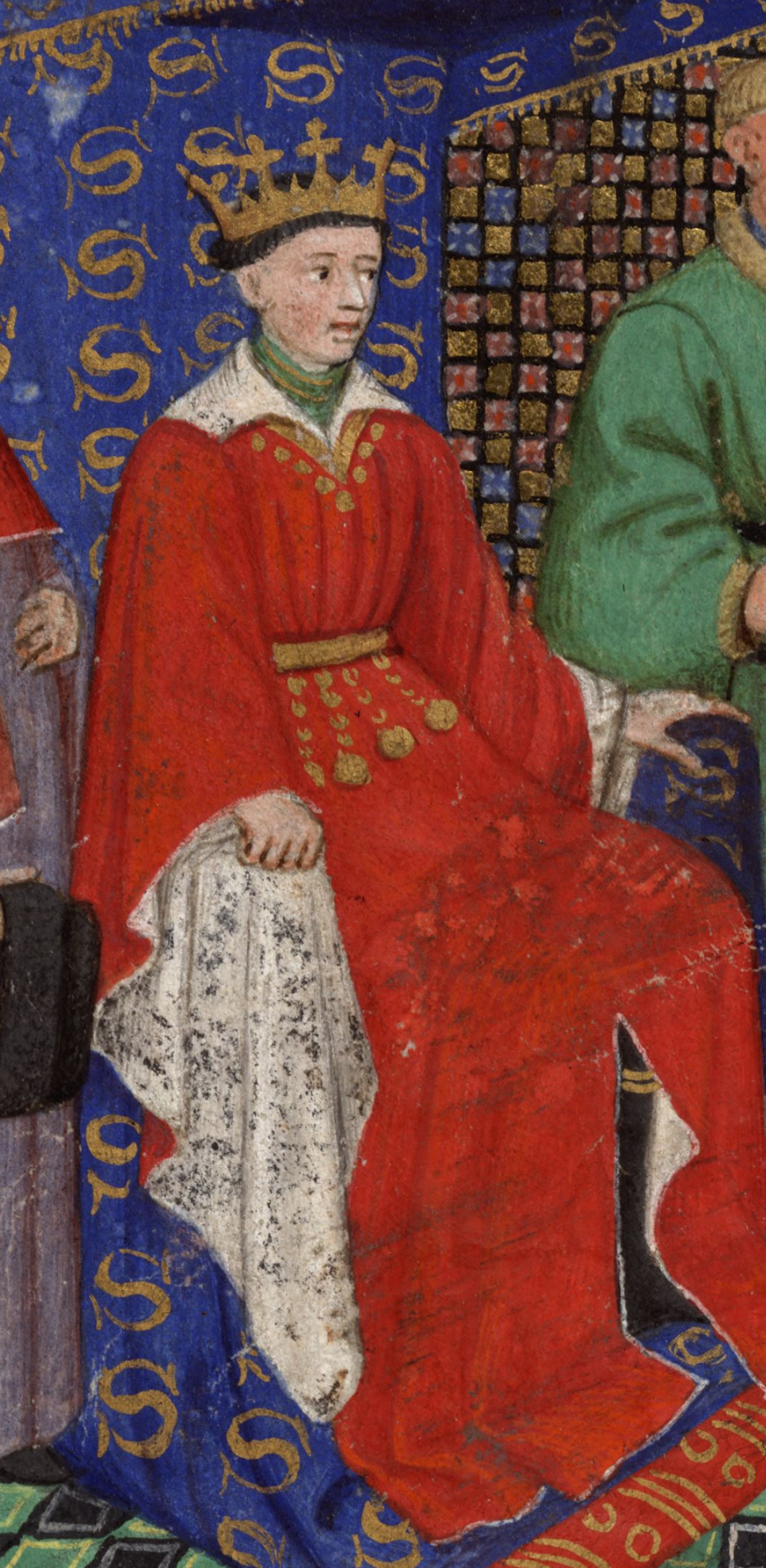
- Miniature of Henry in a devotional book presented to him c.1420 (CCCC MS 213)

King of England
- Reign: 21 March 1413 – 31 August 1422
- Coronation: 9 April 1413
- Predecessor: Henry IV
- Successor: Henry VI

Regent of France
- Regency: 21 May 1420 – 31 August 1422
- Monarch: Charles VI
- Born: 16 September 1386; Monmouth Castle, Wales
- Died: 31 August 1422 (aged 35); Château de Vincennes, France
- Cause of death: Dysentery (likely)
- Burial: 7 November 1422; Westminster Abbey, London
- Spouse: Catherine of Valois (m. 1420)
- Issue: Henry VI
- House: Lancaster
- Father: Henry IV of England
- Mother: Mary de Bohun

Henry V (16 September 1386 (Note: Combinations of 9 August, 16 September, and the years 1386 and 1387 frequently feature as birth dates. Christopher Allmand points out that "virtually every combination has had its supporter, influenced by one near contemporary or another". 16 September appears in Tito Livio Frulovisi's Vita Henrici Quinti, which states that Henry was born on the feast of St Edith. This is corroborated by a 15th-century document held by the John Rylands Library (French MS 54), and an astrological treatise written after Henry's accession. Since Henry's household was at Monmouth in 1386 but not in 1387, and a specific date is given for that year, 16 September 1386 is now regarded as the most likely.) – 31 August 1422), also called Henry of Monmouth, was King of England, Lord of Ireland, and Duke of Aquitaine from 1413 until his death in 1422. His victory at Agincourt in 1415 and his conquest of Normandy gave England the upper hand in the Hundred Years' War and led, by the Treaty of Troyes in 1420, to his recognition as heir and regent of France. This was the high-water mark of the English cause in the war. Celebrated in William Shakespeare's Henriad as one of the greatest warrior-kings of medieval England, Henry was also a forceful ruler at home, restoring public order, working closely with Parliament, and enforcing a strict religious orthodoxy.

Henry of Monmouth was the eldest son of Henry IV, and became heir apparent and Prince of Wales after his father seized the throne from Richard II in 1399. During his father's reign, he gained military experience in Wales against the Glyndŵr rebellion and in fighting the powerful Percy family of Northumberland, and played an important part at the Battle of Shrewsbury when only 16. As his father's health declined, Henry took an increasingly central role in government, though disagreements between the two men led to political conflict. Henry succeeded to the throne after his father's death in March 1413 and revived the long-standing English claim to the French throne.

In 1415, Henry renewed active warfare with France, opening the Lancastrian phase of the Hundred Years' War (1415–1453). His first campaign successfully besieged Harfleur and won a celebrated victory at Agincourt, which strengthened his position in England and lent weight to his claim. A second expedition from 1417 set out to conquer Normandy, recovering for the English crown a duchy lost two centuries earlier; by 1419, his army stood before Paris. Exploiting the civil war that divided France, and allying with Burgundy after the murder of Duke John the Fearless, Henry was able to impose the Treaty of Troyes on Charles VI. The treaty made him regent and heir to the French throne, disinherited the king's own son, the Dauphin Charles, and provided for his marriage to Charles's daughter Catherine of Valois. It envisaged a union of the two crowns in Henry's person on Charles's death. But Henry died in August 1422, seven weeks before the ailing Charles VI, and was succeeded by his only son, the infant Henry VI.

At home, Henry restored order after the turbulence of his father's reign, strengthening the enforcement of justice and working closely with Parliament. He promoted the use of English in royal government and upheld a strict orthodoxy, crushing the Lollard movement and helping to end the Western Schism at the Council of Constance. His later fame has rested above all on his military prowess, on which there has been near-unanimity since his own day. Contemporary French and Burgundian verdicts ranged from admiration for his discipline and prudence to portrayals of a vainglorious tyrant. Modern scholars are divided in their assessments, some condemning Henry as a warmonger whose ambition bankrupted his realm, others reckoning him the greatest of England's kings. Much of the debate turns on his French conquests and how far he was to blame for their loss under his son. His biographer Christopher Allmand concludes that Henry's gifts as a ruler showed most clearly not on the battlefield but in the governing of England, and that the fuller the reckoning of his reign, the higher he stands.

== Early life ==
=== Birth and family ===
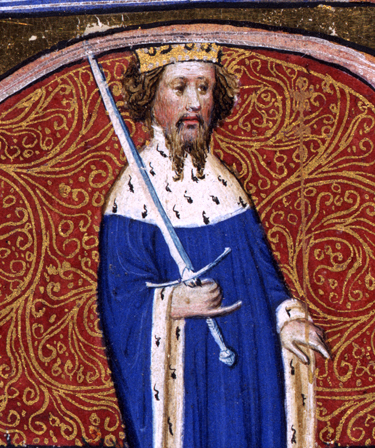
Miniature of Henry's father, Henry IV, in the records of the Duchy of Lancaster, c.1402

Henry was born on 16 September 1386 in the tower above the gatehouse of Monmouth Castle in Monmouthshire, East Wales and so was sometimes called Henry of Monmouth. Henry's birth was not formally recorded because he was not close to the line of succession, and the date and year of his birth were disputed for some time; modern scholarship finds 16 September 1386 most likely. He was the eldest son of Henry of Bolingbroke, the future Henry IV, and Mary de Bohun. Both his parents were young: Bolingbroke was nineteen when his son was born, and Mary, married to him as a child in 1380, was sixteen or seventeen. Henry's grandfather was John of Gaunt, a son of Edward III, and his father was a cousin of the reigning king, Richard II.

Little is known of Henry's early years. As an infant he was looked after by a nurse, Joan Waring; Henry remembered her after he came to the throne, granting her an annuity of £20 a year for life in 1415. He spent his early childhood with his mother Mary until she died in 1394 aged only twenty-four, having already borne six children. With his father often abroad, he then passed into the care of his maternal grandmother, Joan, Countess of Hereford, at Bytham Castle in Lincolnshire, perhaps under a governess, Mary Hervy. He and his brothers also spent time on their father's estates, among them Kenilworth Castle, for which Henry developed a lasting affection.

In 1398 a quarrel between Henry's father and the Duke of Norfolk led Richard to order a trial by combat, only for the king to banish both men before the duel could be fought. With Bolingbroke in exile, Richard took the boy into his own household and treated him generously, granting him an income from the royal revenues after his grandfather John of Gaunt died in early 1399. In May of the same year, Richard took Henry on an expedition to Ireland – the prince's first experience of campaigning, in the course of which Richard knighted him – perhaps also keeping him as surety for his exiled father's conduct. Bolingbroke nevertheless seized on the king's absence to invade England in the Lancastrian usurpation; Richard had Henry confined at Trim Castle in County Meath while hurrying back to England.

Richard was ultimately deposed by the newly styled Henry IV, who recalled his son from Ireland as heir apparent in October 1399. To shore up his untested dynasty, Henry IV invested his son with a wider range of titles than any previous heir to the English throne, including Prince of Wales, Duke of Cornwall, Earl of Chester, Duke of Aquitaine, and Duke of Lancaster, and he was the first heir to the throne known to have been formally invested as Prince of Wales in Parliament, which acknowledged him as his father's successor.

=== Education ===
Henry's formal schooling appears to have begun around the age of eight, when books of Latin grammar were bought for him. He may have been tutored by his uncle Henry Beaufort, Chancellor of the University of Oxford and later Bishop of Winchester. The old claim that he went on to study under Beaufort at Queen's College, Oxford is rejected by modern scholarship, both because he would have been too young, and because his father's household accounts place him elsewhere. He grew into a relatively bookish king, with a good command of Latin and fluency in French, and he learned to read and write English, the first English monarch literate in the vernacular. He was also musical: harp strings were bought for him as a boy, and he may have composed two pieces for the royal chapel.

== Early military career and role in government ==
From 1400 to 1404 Henry served as High Sheriff of Cornwall. In April 1403, he was additionally made royal lieutenant for the whole of Wales, a military appointment during which he led his own forces against Owain Glyndŵr.

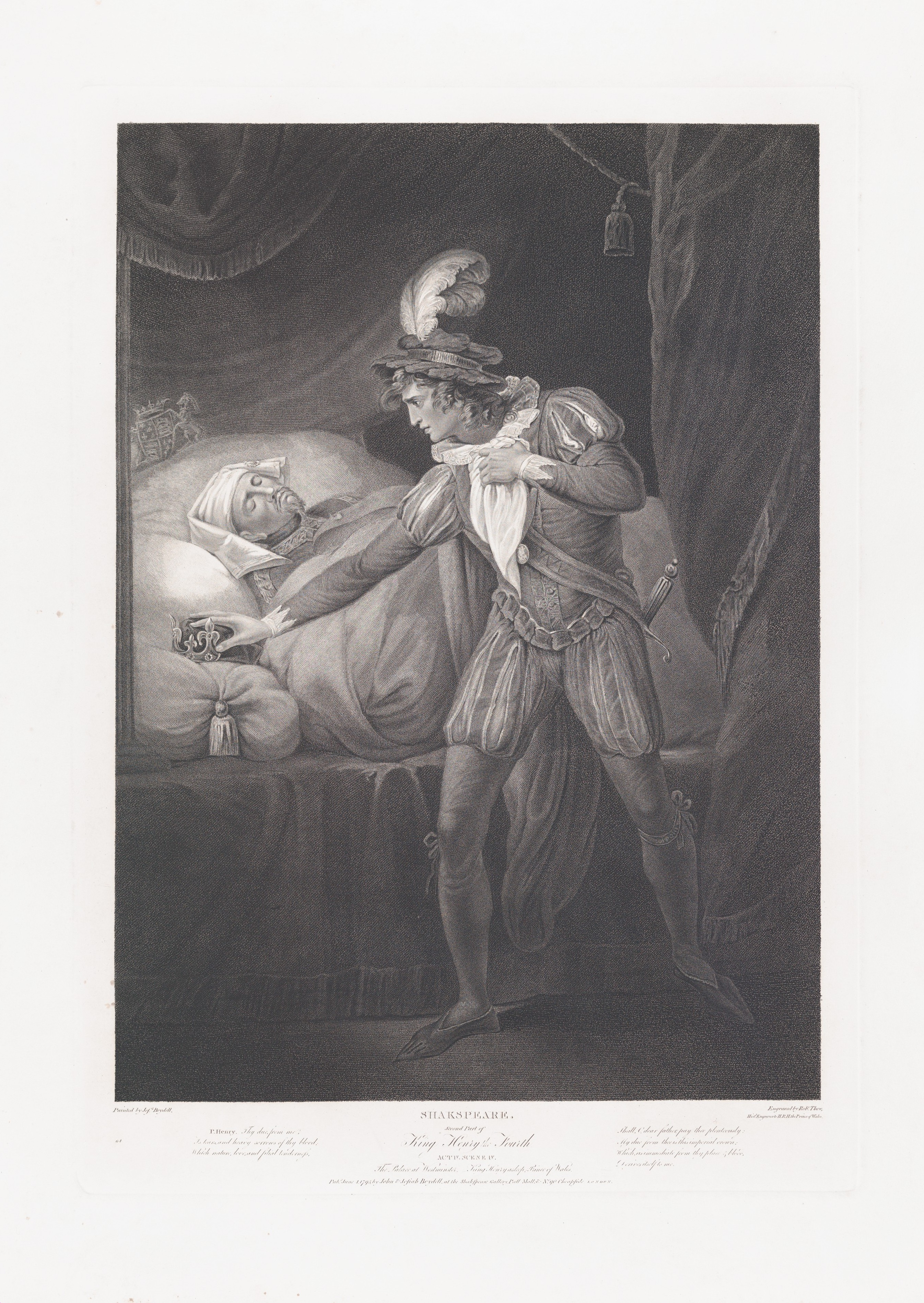
Henry as Prince of Wales tries on his father's crown in a scene from Shakespeare's Henry IV, Part 2, engraving after Josiah Boydell, 1795

At the Battle of Shrewsbury on 21 July 1403, the sixteen-year-old Henry fought alongside his father against the rebel forces of Henry "Hotspur" Percy. During the engagement he was struck in the face by an arrow that penetrated six inches into his skull, lodging near the left cheekbone and narrowly missing vital arteries and the brain. Henry was given the best available care: royal physician John Bradmore treated the wound with honey, which acted as a natural antiseptic, and designed a specialised mechanical screw-tool to extract the arrowhead without causing further damage. Bradmore later recorded the procedure in his Latin manuscript Philomena, describing how he widened the wound, inserted the instrument, and gradually withdrew the arrowhead while flushing it with white wine to prevent infection. The operation was successful but may have left Henry with permanent facial scars.

The Welsh revolt absorbed much of Henry's energy between 1403 and 1406; as his father's health declined, the prince began to take a wider part in politics. Through Henry IV's prolonged illness of 1410–11, backed by his uncles Henry and Thomas Beaufort, legitimised sons of John of Gaunt, he held practical control of the government. Father and son diverged on both foreign and domestic policy, and in November 1411 the king removed Henry from the council. The quarrel was political rather than personal: the Beauforts are thought to have raised the possibility of Henry IV's abdication, and the prince's opponents worked to discredit him.

As prince, Henry's friendship with the Lollard sympathiser John Oldcastle and his opposition to Thomas Arundel, the Archbishop of Canterbury, may have raised Lollard hopes of toleration. The disappointment of those hopes once he became king may lie behind the report of ecclesiastical writers such as Thomas Walsingham that, on his accession, Henry was suddenly changed into a new man.

== Reign ==
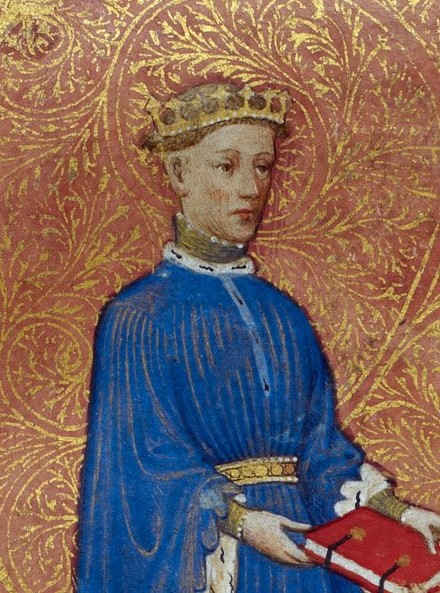
Henry as Prince of Wales in the Regiment of Princes, c.1413 (MS Arundel 38)

=== Accession, 1413 ===
Henry acceded to the throne after his father Henry IV's death on 20 March 1413; the new king was twenty-six years old. Comparatively little is known about Henry's coronation three weeks later, on 9 April 1413 (Passion Sunday) in Westminster Abbey. The ceremony was accompanied by snowy weather, which chronicler Thomas Walsingham recorded as an ambiguous sign of austerity to come or of an end to difficult times, although the general mood towards the new king seems to have been one of optimism. Henry was possibly anointed with a "miraculous oil" said to have been received by Thomas Becket, which had already been used in the coronations of Edward II, Richard II, and Henry IV.

Contemporary impressions describe the new king as above average height, of spare but athletic build, with a long, lean face and nose, straight brown hair, and brown eyes. He was said to be a notably fast runner, useful in the hunting he loved. He was clean-shaven, but may have grown a forked beard later in life. A Frenchman who met him in 1415 thought he looked more like a priest than a soldier, an impression that may have encouraged the French to underrate him. Two surviving contemporary depictions (in illuminated manuscripts Arundel MS 38 and CCCC MS 213) show Henry's characteristic bowl cut hairstyle, which may have contributed to his monk-like appearance; antiquarian David Williamson felt a "general air of fanaticism" was evident in Henry's portraits.

At his accession Henry sought to heal some divisions left by his father's usurpation. The deposed Richard II was honourably re-interred at Westminster late in 1413, and the heirs of the earldoms of Huntingdon, Northumberland and Salisbury were restored to their inheritances.

=== Dispute with France ===
Henry had set his sights on war with France from early in his reign. By June 1413, he was soliciting contributions for a French expedition, and the next year, cannons were cast at the Tower of London in readiness. The contemporary case for war drew on a familiar stock of grievances, such as old commercial disputes and the assistance France had given Owain Glyndŵr. This was reinforced by the disordered condition of France itself, where the mentally unstable Charles VI presided over a court increasingly split between Armagnac and Burgundian factions. A later tradition held that ecclesiastical statesmen encouraged Henry into the French war to divert attention from troubles at home, which is the version that reached Shakespeare through the Tudor chroniclers. Historians have doubted this account, and in any case Henry's preparations were well advanced before any such pressure could have been brought to bear. Beneath these immediate pretexts lay an older grievance: the dynastic claim to the French throne first pursued by Edward III, which in English opinion justified the war.

Edward's claim had rested on his descent, through his mother Isabella, from her father Philip IV of France, of the House of Capet. But when the direct Capetian line failed in 1328, the French preferred Philip VI, of the cadet house of Valois, and defended his succession by appeal to Salic law, which allegedly barred inheritance through the female line. The resulting quarrel opened the Hundred Years' War in 1337. Active warfare largely subsided under Richard II and Henry IV, but in 1415 Henry V revived the dynastic claim and renewed hostilities. What Henry actually demanded owed less to the bare claim to the throne than to the Treaty of Brétigny of 1360, whose terms he and his father had both tried to enforce: the return of lands it had granted to England, and the unpaid remainder of the ransom of John II of France.

Henry negotiated for over two years with both Armagnacs and Burgundians while renewing a series of truces with the crown; successive embassies to Paris in 1414 and 1415 opened with sweeping territorial claims, retreated to more modest ones, and returned empty-handed. Modern historians have read this diplomacy not as a serious search for peace, but as a way of extracting concessions and holding the posture of the aggrieved party while preparations for war went forward. The breakdown of these embassies lies behind the most famous legend of the reign, related in Shakespeare's Henry V. Dismissing Henry as too inexperienced in war to be feared, the French were said to have sent him a gift of "Paris balls", meaning tennis balls, implying that he was fitter for games than for fighting. He reportedly retorted that he would return "London balls" – cannon balls – to batter down French houses. Whether actual balls were sent or these were just taunts is uncertain, but the incident reflects Henry's poor international reputation early in his reign; the French did not take him seriously on the eve of war.

=== First campaign in France, 1415 ===
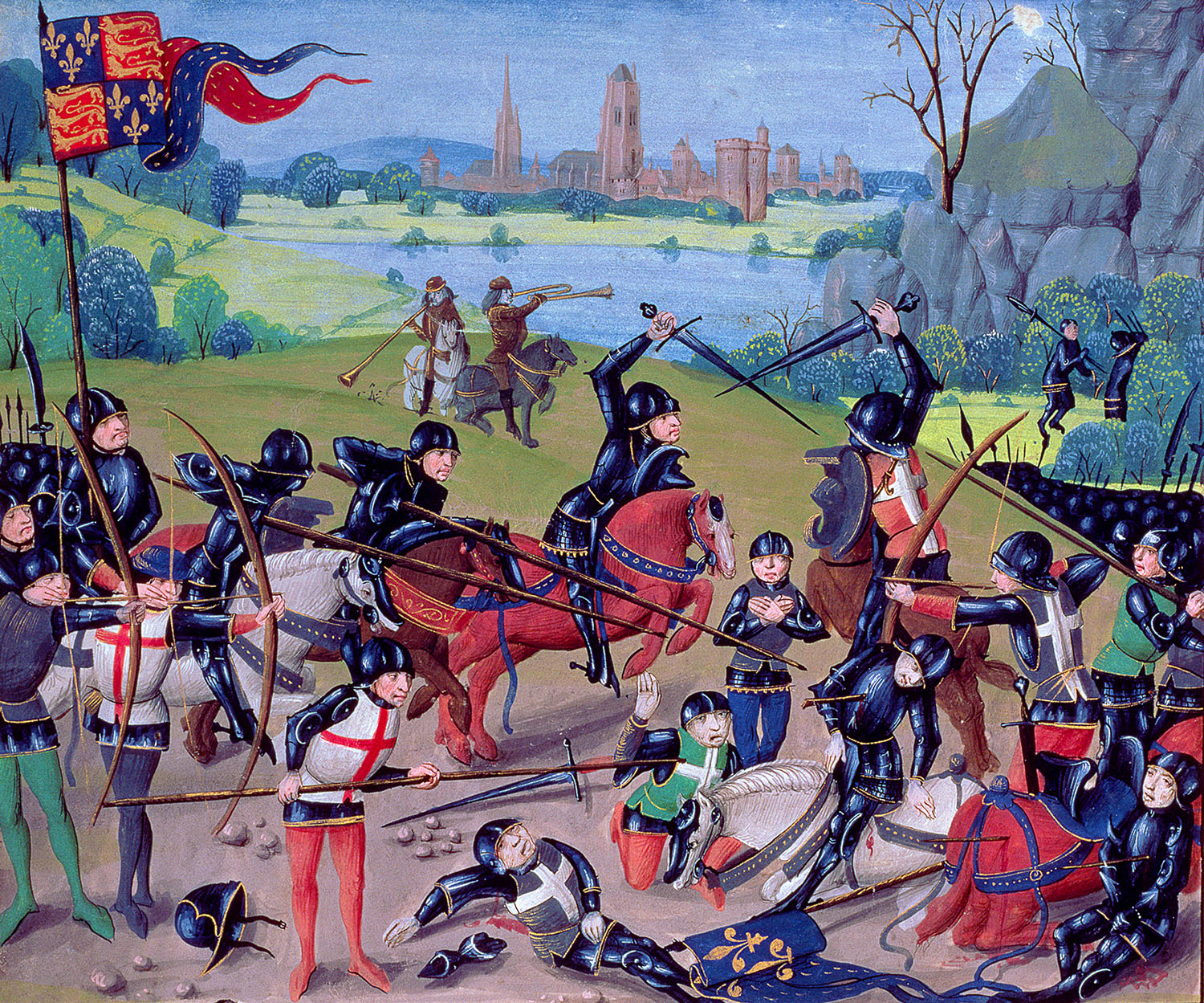
The Battle of Agincourt as depicted in Thomas Walsingham's St Albans Chronicle, c.1422

The preparations for war with France culminated in the summer of 1415, when a fleet of some 1,500 vessels assembled in the Solent to carry Henry's army across the English Channel. As the army gathered at Southampton, a conspiracy against the king came to light. The Southampton Plot, led by Richard of Conisburgh, Henry Scrope, and Thomas Grey, aimed to depose Henry in favour of Edmund Mortimer, 5th Earl of March, who also had a claim to the throne. However, Mortimer himself revealed the plot to the king on 31 July, and the three ringleaders were put on trial and executed only days later. On 11 and 12 August 1415, Henry sailed from Southampton and landed near Harfleur on the Norman coast by 14 August. His forces then besieged the town's fortress, capturing it on 22 September. Illness had thinned his army, but on 8 October, against the warnings of his council, he set out for Calais. Around mid-October, Henry encountered a blockade of the ford at Blanchetaque near Abbeville, forcing him inland in search of another crossing. On 19 October, his army crossed south of Péronne at Béthencourt and Voyennes, then turned north again towards Calais.

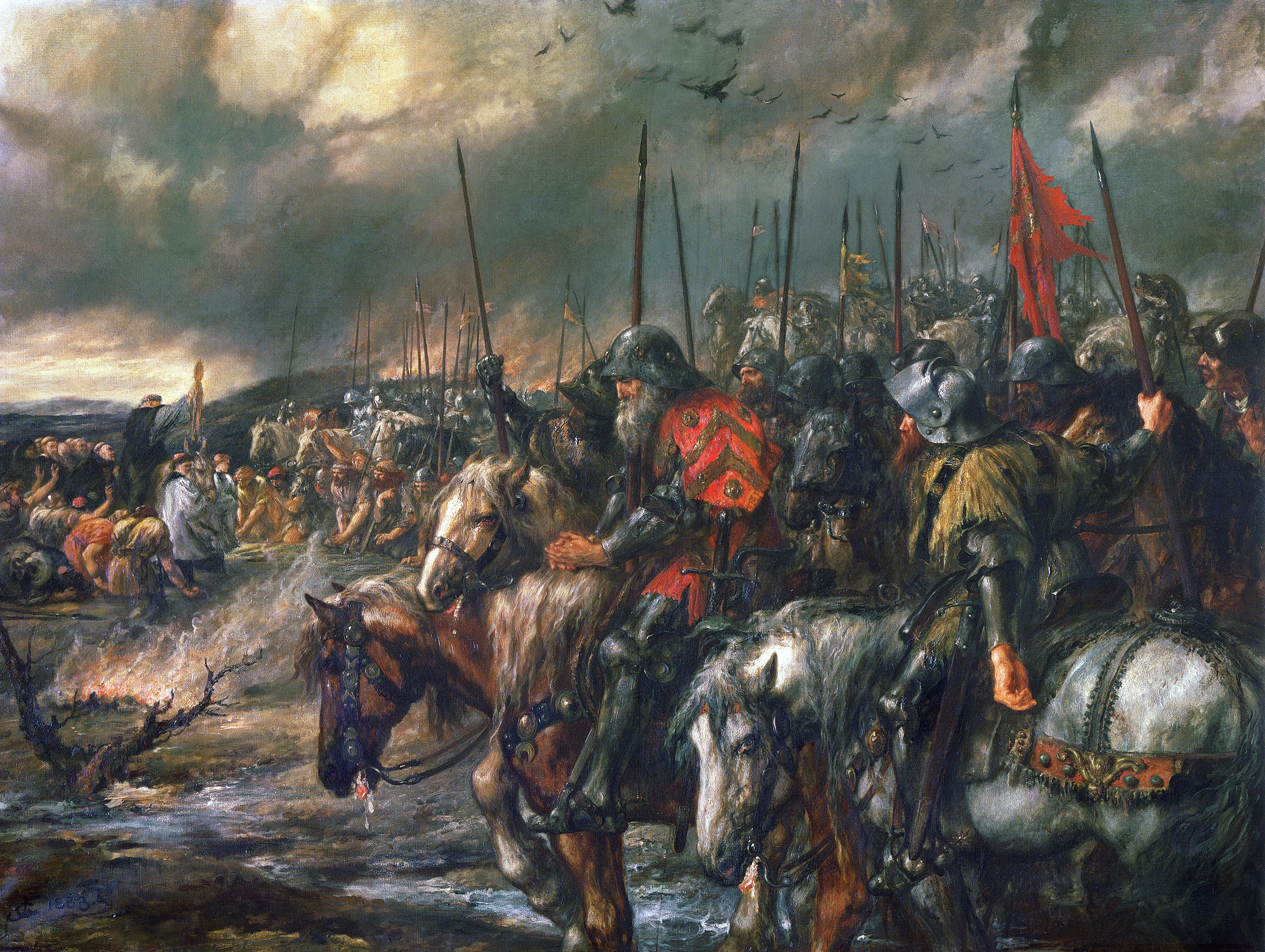
The Morning of the Battle of Agincourt by John Gilbert, 1884

On 24 October, on the plains near the village of Agincourt, a French army intercepted his route. Although his men-at-arms were exhausted, malnourished, and outnumbered, Henry led his men into battle early on the morning of 25 October, decisively defeating the French, who suffered severe losses. Heavy rain the night before had left the ground waterlogged, and the French men-at-arms were bogged down in the mud. With their advance slowed to a crawl, they made easy targets for the English archers on the flanks. In about three hours of intense fighting, thousands of French knights and soldiers were killed or taken prisoner. It was Henry's greatest military success, ranking alongside the Battle of Crécy (1346) and the Battle of Poitiers (1356) as the most significant English victories of the Hundred Years' War. Agincourt strengthened Henry's standing in England and lent weight to the justice of his claim to the French throne. Domestically it was highly significant: a triumph on this scale, won by a king whose father had usurped the throne only sixteen years before, helped quiet lingering doubts about his dynasty's legitimacy and bind the realm behind him in a common enterprise. In an infamous episode during the battle, Henry ordered the killing of the French prisoners taken so far. The eyewitness author of the Gesta Henrici Quinti explained this act as a response to the threat of a renewed attack by the still-uncommitted French rearguard. The Burgundian chroniclers Jean Le Fèvre and Jean de Wavrin, both present at the battle, record that Henry's men-at-arms were reluctant to comply because they stood to lose substantial ransoms. No contemporary chronicler explicitly condemned Henry for the order, and even hostile French chroniclers such as Jean Juvénal des Ursins treated it as a misfortune of war rather than a moral outrage.

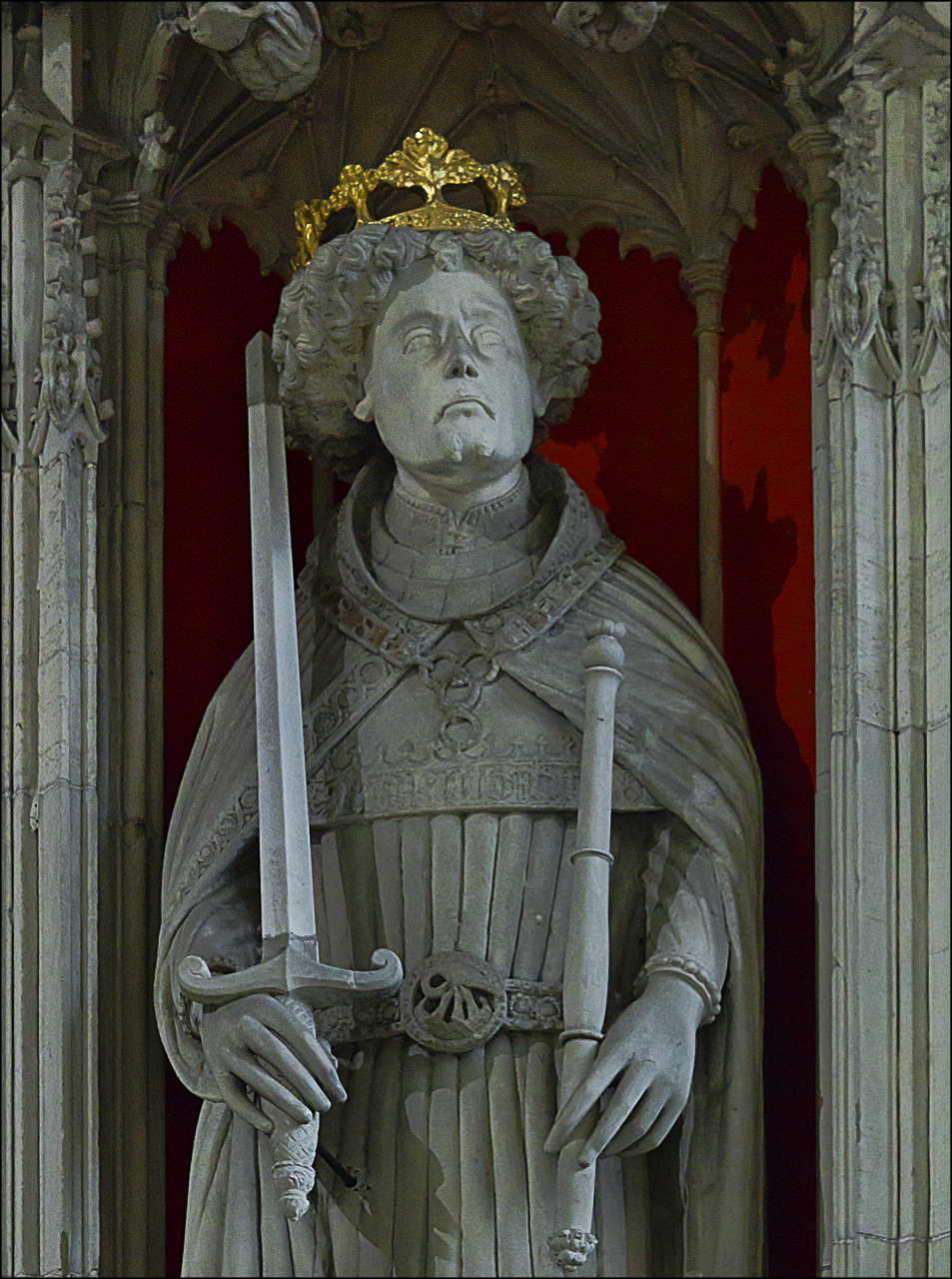
Statue of Henry in the pulpitum (choir screen) at York Minster, c.1460 but begun c.1425

After the victory, Henry marched to Calais and returned to England in November, where London staged an elaborate civic triumph to receive him. Contemporaries recalled the king's studied humility: he entered the city in a plain gown, attended only by a small retinue from his household rather than an escort of knights, presenting his victory as God's work rather than his own.

=== Treaty of Canterbury, 1416 ===
Following Agincourt, Henry consolidated his position through diplomacy as well as arms. In 1416 King Sigismund of Hungary (later Holy Roman Emperor) visited England hoping to mediate a peace and to persuade Henry to moderate his demands towards France. The king entertained him lavishly and enrolled him in the Order of the Garter, in return for which Sigismund was said to have given Henry the petrified heart of Saint George. While the mission did not achieve its goal of mediation, it did produce an alliance: by the Treaty of Canterbury of August 1416, Sigismund accepted the justice of Henry's claims to the French throne and bound himself in a "perpetual alliance" with England against France.

=== Conquest of Normandy, 1417–1419 ===
The expedition Henry launched in 1417 was conceived very differently from the raid of 1415. Landing near Touques on 1 August with an army of around 10,000 men, he set out not to win a single battle but to occupy Normandy piece by piece, taking and garrisoning towns and castles so that the surrounding country could be controlled. Normandy had been held by the French crown since King John lost the duchy in 1204, and Henry framed his campaign as the recovery of a historic English possession, appealing to Norman separatism and the duchy's Anglo-Norman past. He began in Lower Normandy, where the Seine screened him from interference and his sieges lay beyond the reach of relief from Paris. He besieged Caen from August to September 1417 and Falaise over the following winter. The advance was eased by the divisions among his enemies: with the Armagnac and Burgundian parties each more anxious to court English support than to combine against him, Henry could press far-reaching claims, and keep the French factions looking to him rather than to one another.

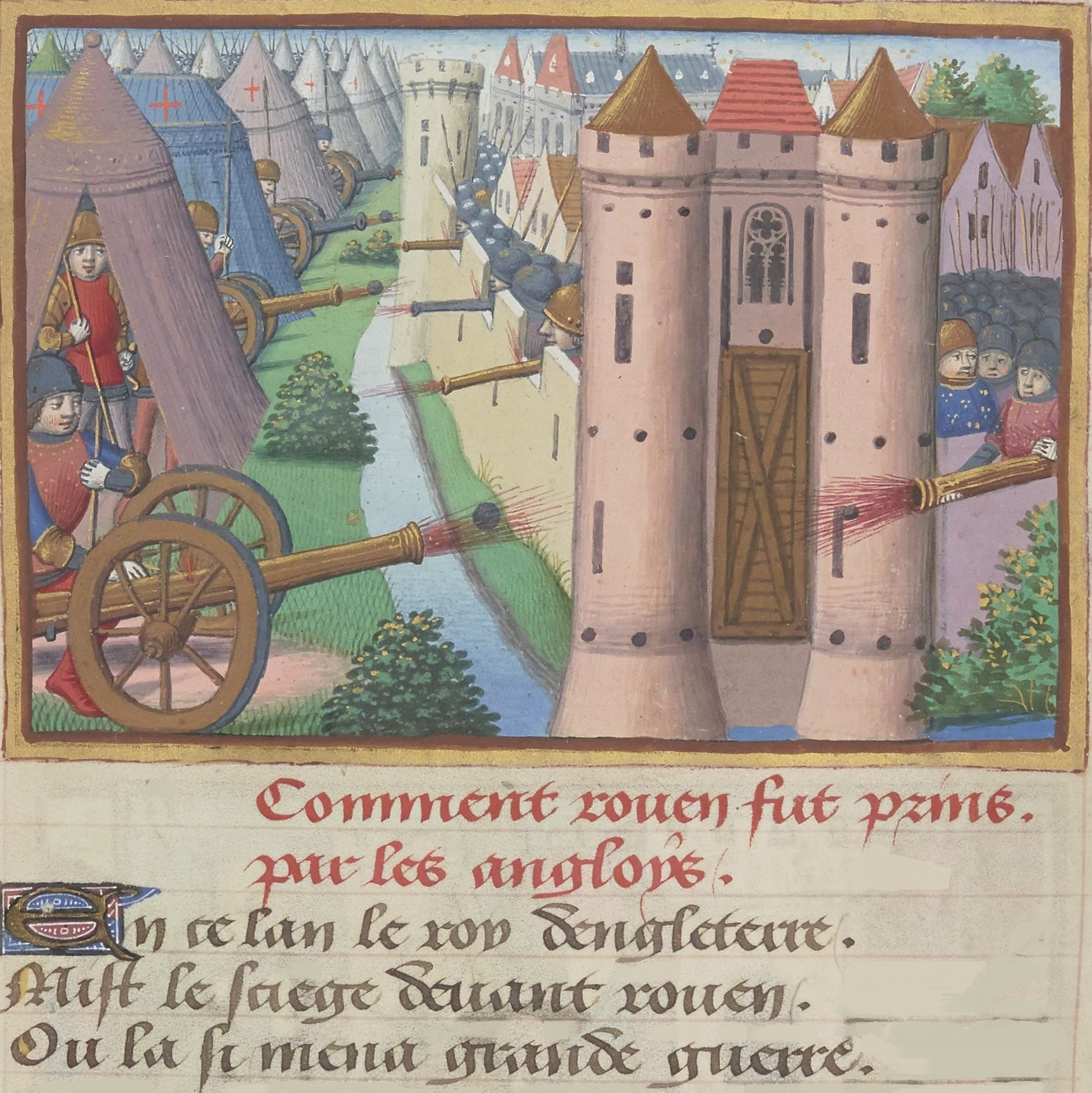
The siege of Rouen in a French miniature, c.1484

The conquest of Upper Normandy turned on the siege of Rouen, the ducal capital, which Henry began in the summer of 1418. Controlling the Seine with a chain across the river and supplying his army by barge from Harfleur, he sealed the city off and waited. As food ran short, the garrison expelled the old, the sick, and the poor into the ditch beneath the walls, expecting Henry either to let them pass or to feed them; he did neither, relenting only at Christmas, and is said to have answered that he had not put them there. His conduct towards these non-combatants has weighed on his reputation since. The city finally surrendered on 19 January 1419.

With Rouen taken, the conquest of Normandy was effectively complete. Henry pushed up the Seine, and the fall of Pontoise at the end of July 1419 gave him the region of Vexin and the road to the capital; by August his army stood before the walls of Paris. For a moment, a much broader settlement seemed within reach. In June 1419 Henry negotiated with John the Fearless, Duke of Burgundy, and Queen Isabella at Meulan, and he came close to terms more generous than the Treaty of Brétigny had ever offered: Normandy in full sovereignty as well as Aquitaine, sealed by a marriage to Charles VI and Isabella's daughter Catherine of Valois. But the negotiations failed because the French were unable to accept so great a dismemberment of the crown without driving their own followers to the Dauphin Charles. When the Burgundians and Armagnacs were then briefly reconciled, France threatened to unite against Henry and to commit him to an open-ended war that his English resources could not sustain. Henry was dangerously close to overplaying his hand.

=== Treaty of Troyes, 1420 ===
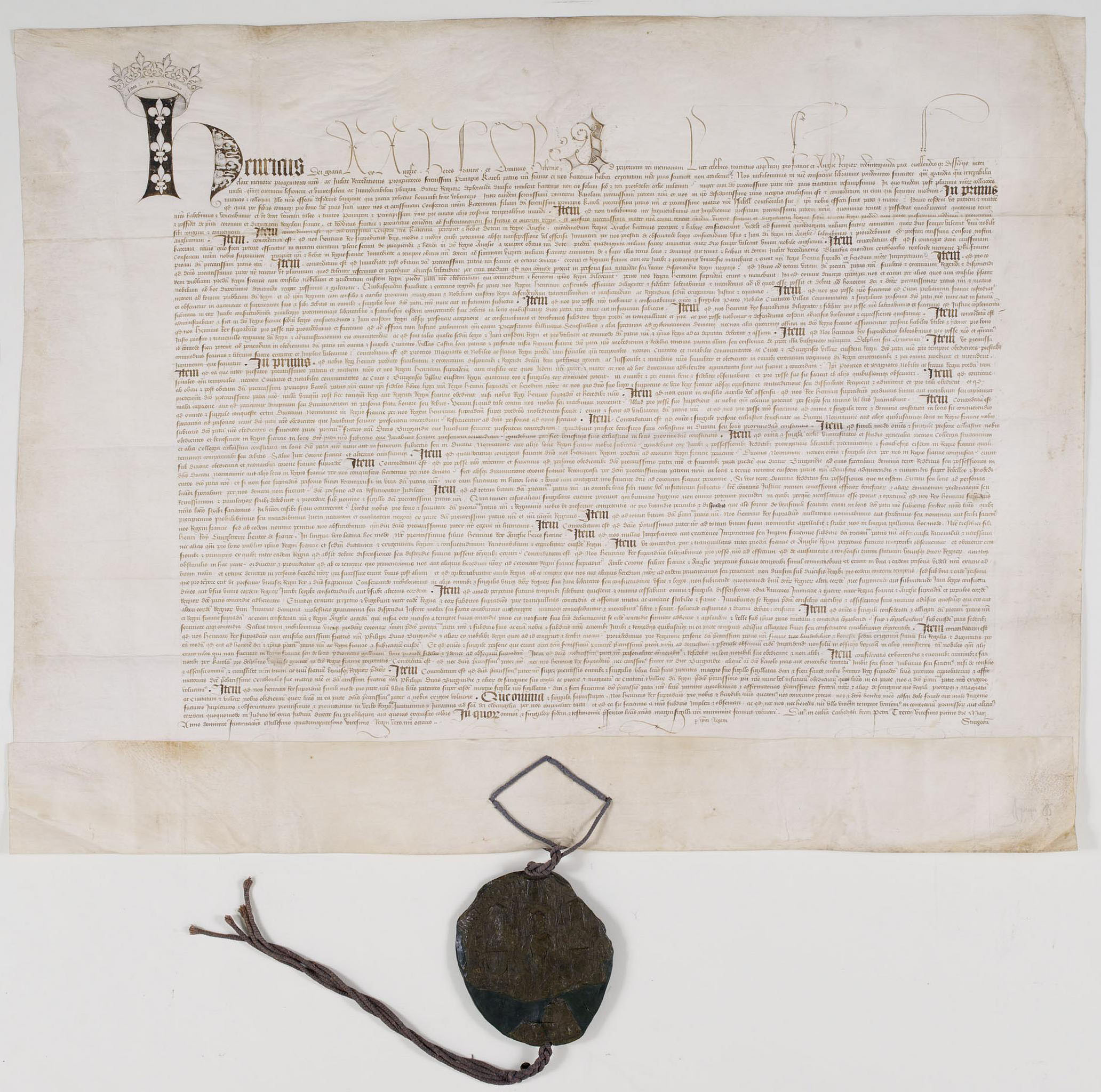
The Treaty of Troyes between Henry and Charles VI

But the danger passed as abruptly as it had arisen. On 10 September 1419, at a parley on the bridge of Montereau, John the Fearless was assassinated by partisans of the Dauphin, shattering the reconciliation between the French factions that had briefly united them against Henry. The murder drove John's son and successor, Philip the Good, to avenge his father by allying with England. This Anglo-Burgundian alliance gave Henry the leverage he had lacked at Meulan and the means to impose terms on Charles VI. The resulting settlement broke with the entire tradition of Anglo-French diplomacy. Every negotiation since the Treaty of Brétigny had turned on ceding French land in full sovereignty, but the Treaty of Troyes diverted the French succession itself, a solution conceivable only in the extraordinary circumstances the murder had created. Disinheriting the Dauphin, the treaty recognised Henry as heir and regent of France and provided for his marriage to Charles VI's daughter Catherine, with a dowry of 600,000 écus. The treaty was signed on 21 May 1420 and ratified by the Estates General in Paris in December, but it was never accepted in the Dauphinist territories south of the Loire. The wedding between Henry and Catherine took place at Troyes Cathedral on 2 June 1420. Two days after the ceremony, Henry besieged Sens, which fell in less than a week. He then moved to take the fortress at Montereau, which capitulated by 1 July. He besieged and captured Melun by November 1420, returning to England after three and a half years of fighting in France.

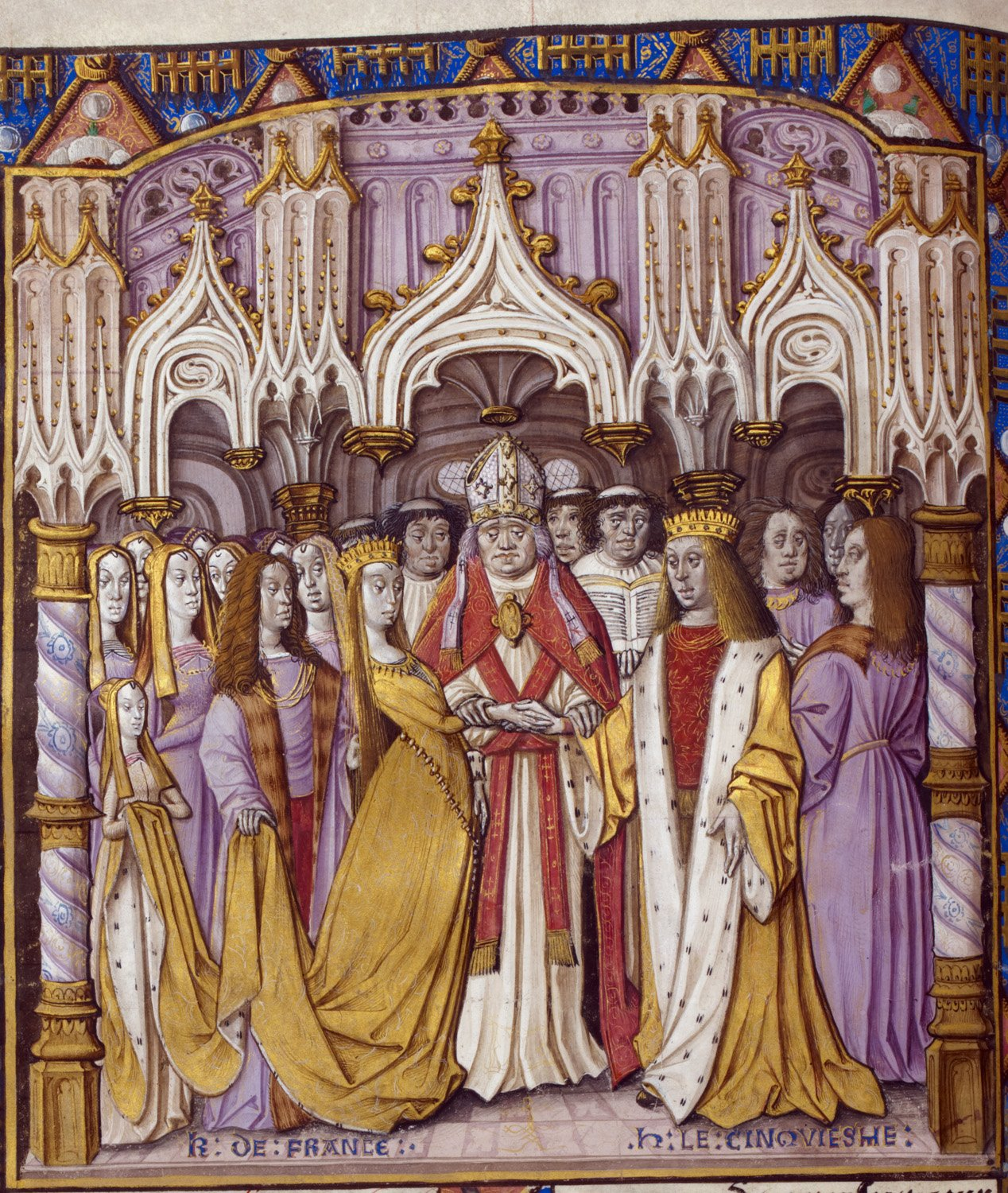
Miniature of Henry's marriage to Catherine of Valois, c.1490

While Henry was in England, his brother Thomas, Duke of Clarence, commanded the English forces in France. On 22 March 1421, Thomas suffered a disastrous defeat at the Battle of Baugé against a Franco-Scottish army, during which the duke himself was killed. On 10 June, Henry sailed back to France to retrieve the situation. From July to August, Henry's forces besieged and captured Dreux, thus relieving allied forces at Chartres. On 6 October, his forces began to lay siege to Meaux, which was made difficult by floods and enemy cavalry harassing the English foraging parties. Late in the year, news reached Henry at Meaux that back in Windsor Castle, his wife had given birth to a son on 6 December, the future Henry VI. The continuity of Lancastrian rule now seemingly secured, Henry redoubled his efforts to take Meaux; its garrison eventually surrendered on 10 May 1422.

=== Death, 1422 ===
Henry fell ill in June 1422, shortly after celebrating Whitsun in Paris, for which his wife Catherine had joined him without their infant son. Contemporary sources such as Jean de Wavrin claimed the king was afflicted by smallpox, leprosy, or erysipelas ("St Anthony's fire"), while Thomas Basin suggested the king had contracted dysentery in Meaux. Scholars believe dysentery is the most probable explanation as unsanitary conditions in the English camp facilitated the spread of the disease. In late June 1422, he appeared well enough to lead his forces toward Cosne-sur-Loire to engage Dauphinist troops, but he suffered a relapse, possibly from heatstroke or a resurgence of dysentery, and had to be carried in a litter. Henry was taken back to the Château de Vincennes east of Paris, where his condition deteriorated further. On 26 August, Henry dictated a codicil to his will. It named Thomas and Henry Beaufort as Henry VI's guardians and educators, and his brother Humphrey, Duke of Gloucester, as regent of England. The government of France was to be offered first to Philip the Good to maintain the Anglo-Burgundian alliance; only if he refused was Henry's brother John, Duke of Bedford, to step into the role. Henry died in the early hours of 31 August 1422, aged thirty-five; he had reigned for nine and a half years.

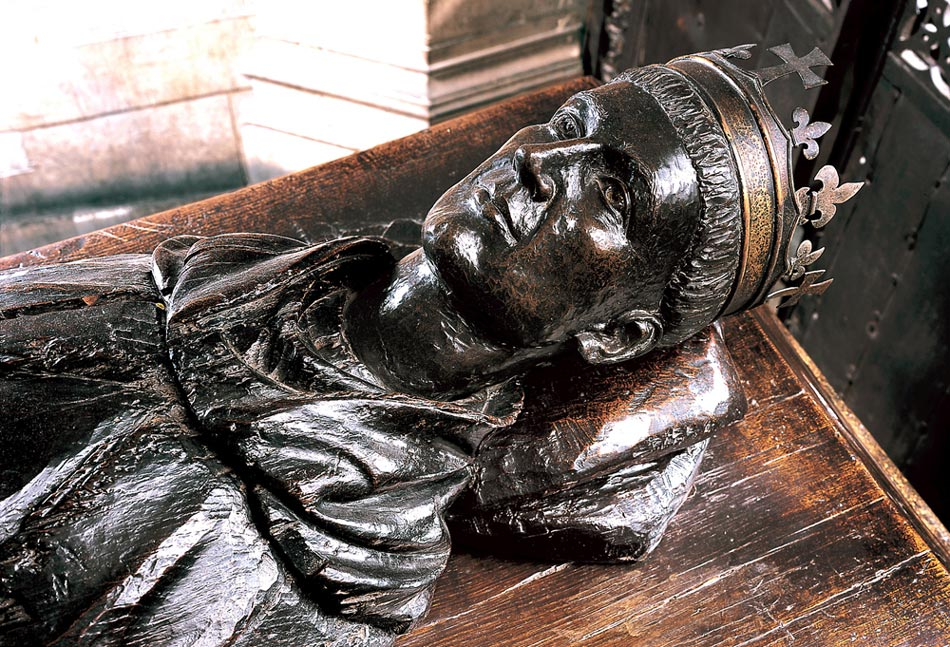
Effigy of Henry V in Westminster Abbey (the head and crown are reconstructions from 1971)

After his death, his body was embalmed and transported to England, where a solemn funeral procession preceded his burial in Westminster Abbey on 7 November 1422. Henry's tomb carries the 16th-century Latin inscription "Henry V, hammer of the Gauls, lies here. [...] Virtue conquers all. [...] Flee idleness". The monument is a few yards away from the grave of his friend and Privy Council member Richard Courtenay; despite what is stated in some sources, they are not buried together.

=== Government and administration ===
Henry approached the government of England as an active, personally engaged ruler; Christopher Allmand has characterised the relationship between king and political institutions as "a joint enterprise in government". Henry had served a long apprenticeship in administration, taking practical control of the royal council between 1410 and 1411. As king he kept a close grip on business even while campaigning in France. The privy seal office, which acted as a secretariat to the council, was divided in two: one department stayed at Westminster, the other travelled with the king. Central administration remained responsive to his direction throughout his campaigns.

Relations with Parliament were generally cooperative. Parliament met eleven times during the reign, and Henry attended six of its sittings. The opening addresses to his early parliaments, composed by chancellor Henry Beaufort, projected a consistent image of the king as a defender of law, religion, and the nation. While Henry's parliaments met more frequently than those under his father, each session only lasted half as long on average (four weeks vs. nine weeks under Henry IV); Gerald Harriss sees this as an expression of the business-like and effective nature of Henry's government – the king had "no time for parliament as talking-shop". Notably, his parliaments produced far fewer petitions from the Commons than his predecessors' had, but a larger proportion of them were successful in becoming statutes. Parliament also proved generous in supply, granting Henry subsidies on wool and other goods and, after the Battle of Agincourt, voting him the customs of tonnage and poundage for life.

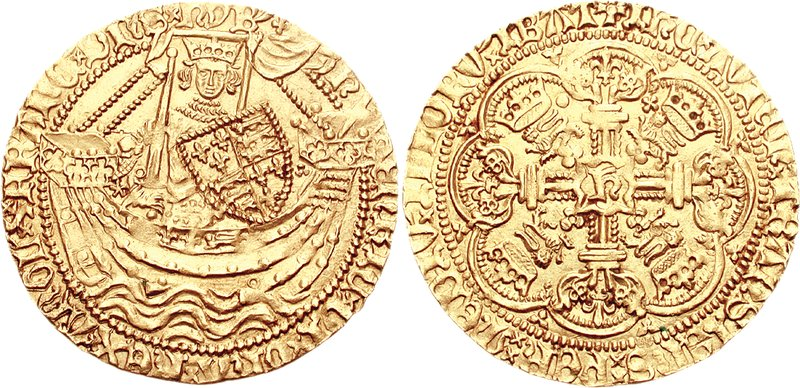
A gold noble coin from Henry V's reign

Henry's wars placed exceptional strain on the crown's finances, and parliamentary taxation alone could not meet their cost. The king relied heavily on credit, with Henry Beaufort his principal creditor and the recovery of pawned crown jewels a recurring concern of the council. For the Agincourt campaign Henry lacked the cash to pay the wages due for the second quarter of service, and the nobility had to accept royal jewels and plate as pledges of future payment; many were redeemed only slowly, some not until the reign of Henry VI. Such borrowing worked through the Exchequer's established system of assignment: instead of cash, creditors received tallies authorising payment from local revenues. But this system held only so long as the revenue assigned actually came in. The restoration of public order was a central concern of the reign's early years. Henry had inherited widespread disorder, including feuding among the gentry of the north and Midlands, and attacks by English mariners on foreign vessels in defiance of royal truces. The Parliament of 1413 had complained about these incidents, but left them largely unaddressed; Edward Powell argues that a campaign against disorder at home was a necessary precondition of the planned invasion of France. Henry made the restoration of order the principal theme of his second Parliament, which met at Leicester in April 1414. To demonstrate the government's resolve, the Court of King's Bench accompanied Parliament to Leicester and sat as a "superior eyre", a criminal court of first instance. In response to petitions the eyre was extended into Shropshire and Staffordshire, and the Leicester legislation, including the Statute of Riots and the Statute of Truces, was framed to give the royal courts wider powers against rioting and piracy. Lawlessness at sea was further tackled by the Safe Conducts Act of 1414, intended to protect merchants and uphold the crown's truces, though recurrent unrest in Lancashire and Cheshire continued to appear in the parliamentary record between 1419 and 1421.

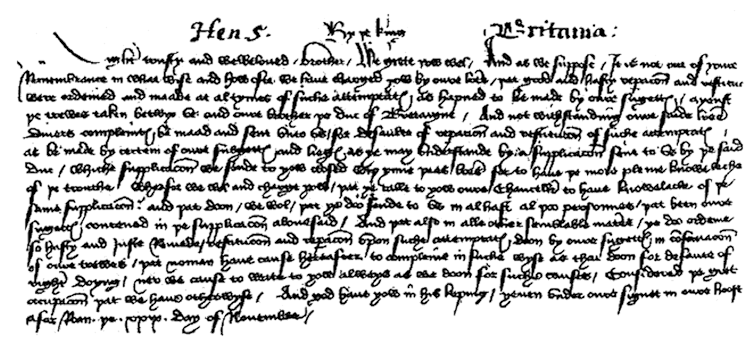
English chancery hand. Facsimile of a letter from Henry, 1418.

From 1417, Henry promoted the use of English as a language of record in government, and he was the first English king since the Norman Conquest to use English in his personal correspondence. His reign is associated with the emergence of Chancery Standard English. Medievalist John Hurt Fisher described Henry's reign as the "turning point in establishing English as the national language of England".

=== Religion ===
Henry's Christian conviction was genuine and unusually strong for a king, but it was also pragmatic. His rigorous orthodoxy was hardened by the need to set himself against Lollardy, at a time when England was widely regarded as the chief source of heresy outside Hussite Bohemia. Historian Jeremy Catto sees the reign as a turning point at which public authority took over the enforcement of religious conformity: churchmen led by Robert Hallam and Archbishop Henry Chichele worked systematically to control opinion and impose orthodoxy. Henry's own devotion found expression in elaborate public worship and a renowned Chapel Royal, whose composers enjoyed a European reputation. He also showed his piety through patronage: in 1414–1415 he established a Carthusian charterhouse beside the royal manor at Sheen (now Richmond), and Syon Abbey as a home for Bridgettine nuns. He endowed both generously, leaving them books and money, and they became notable religious centres.

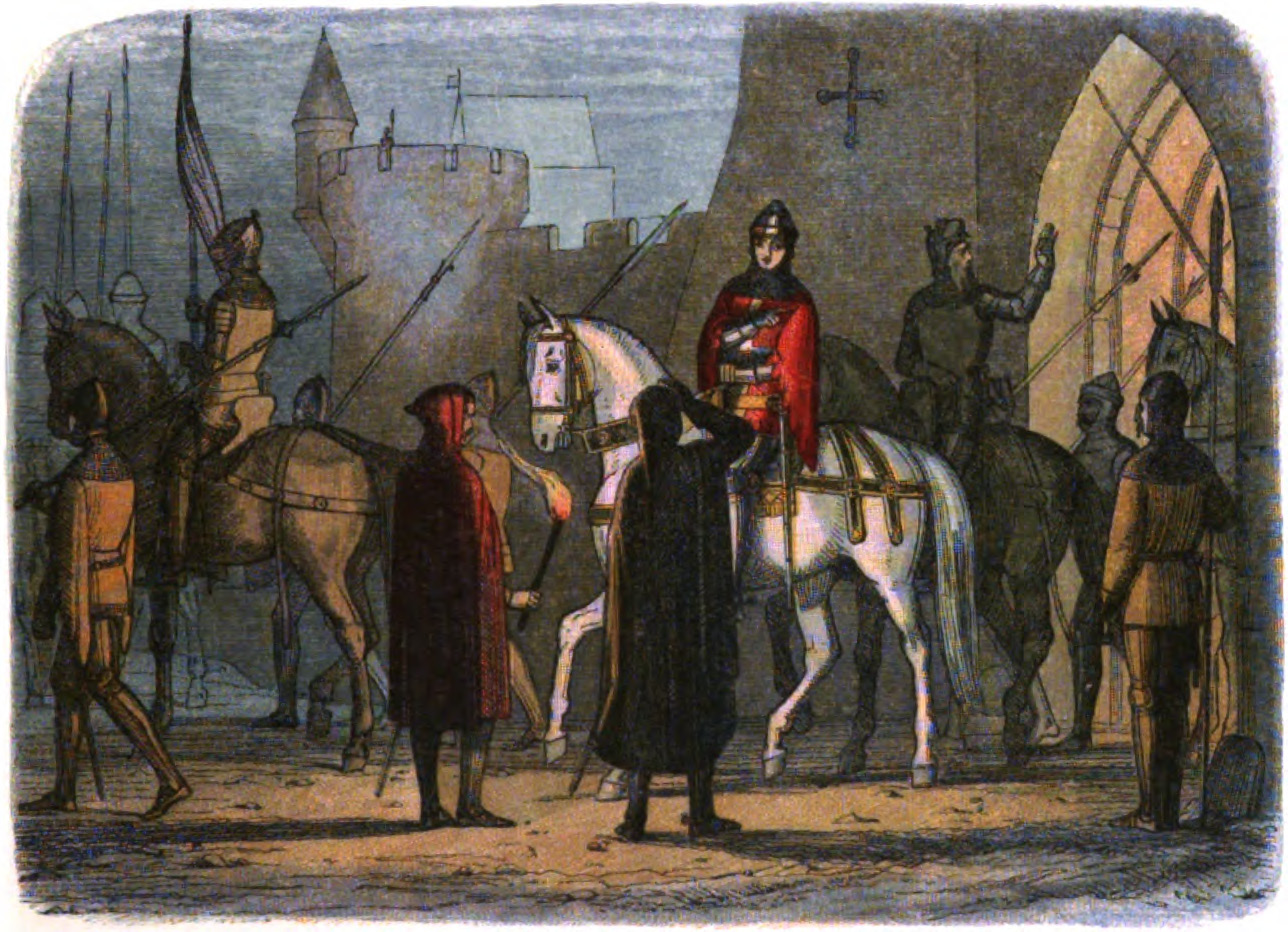
Depiction of Henry marching his forces against the Lollards, from an 1864 book

As Prince of Wales, Henry had been associated with the Lollard knight Sir John Oldcastle, but on his accession he committed himself firmly to orthodoxy. The breach with the Lollards became open during the Oldcastle Revolt in January 1414, which was swiftly crushed, and John Oldcastle executed in 1417 after three years in hiding. The Leicester parliament of 1414 passed the Statute of Lollards, which for the first time made heresy a felony and a breach of the king's peace as well as an ecclesiastical offence, drawing the secular courts into the detection and punishment of heterodoxy.

Henry's reign coincided with the climax of the Great Western Schism, which he worked to help end in a way that would serve both the Church and England, and the conflict was resolved at the Council of Constance (1414–1418) with the election of Pope Martin V. The English delegation at Constance was highly active, but the king kept it firmly under his own direction: in 1417 he forbade his subjects there to act without the agreement of his accredited envoys, and he guarded the crown's rights under the Statute of Provisors and the Statute of Praemunire against concessions to papal authority.

=== Military organisation ===
Henry's great military successes were in part due to the organisation of his forces. His armies were heavily weighted towards archers armed with the formidable English longbow, with three archers for every man-at-arms, a ratio that rose further over the course of his campaigns. Anne Curry estimates the army Henry led to France in 1415 as 10,000–12,000 strong, one of the largest English armies of the whole Hundred Years' War, of which 80% or more were archers. The army of 1417 numbered just over 10,000, and with reinforcements its fighting strength reached some 12,000–13,000 by 1418.

After Agincourt the war became overwhelmingly one of sieges rather than pitched battles, and taking fortified towns such as Harfleur in 1415, Rouen in 1418–19, and Meaux in 1421–22 relied heavily on Henry's artillery. Allmand judges that, after the longbow at Agincourt, the cannon was the weapon that made the greatest impact on the war: Henry took up the cannon just as it was gaining in power and before fortification had adapted to withstand it; as the aggressor, he could bring its full weight to bear. Artillery barrages helped force the surrender of Harfleur, while the captured town of Caen later served as an ordnance depot for the Norman campaigns. The war consumed traditional munitions on a vast scale too: by one calculation the crown bought well over a million arrows between 1418 and 1421.

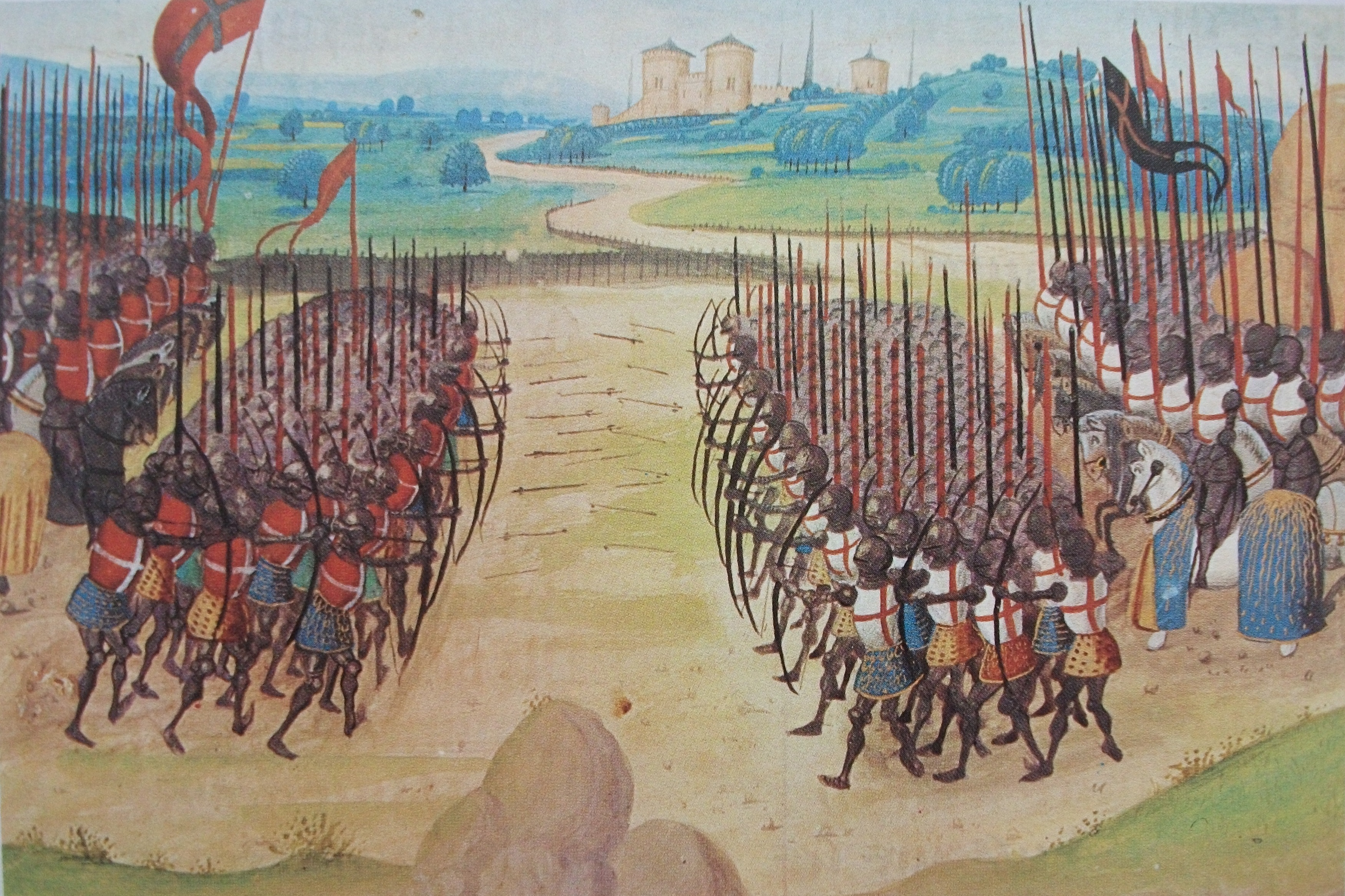
French miniature of archers at the Battle of Agincourt, c.1475

Henry was also keen to have command of the sea, since armies and supplies had to be moved across the Channel, and he invested in a royal fleet that included some of the largest ships of the age. Where he had owned a single "great ship" in 1415, he had several by 1420, among them the Trinity Royal, the Holy Ghost, and one of the largest ships of her time, the Grace Dieu. The fleet's value was shown in 1416, when a Franco-Genoese fleet blockaded the English garrison at Harfleur while a French army besieged it by land. In March 1416 a raiding force of soldiers under the Earl of Dorset, Thomas Beaufort, was attacked and narrowly escaped defeat at the Battle of Valmont after a counterattack by the garrison of Harfleur. Henry's brother John, Duke of Bedford, relieved the town in August, defeating the Genoese in the Battle of the Seine in a hard-fought action that took several of their great carracks and gave the English mastery of the Channel for the next years, which was a precondition of the renewed invasion of Normandy in 1417.

== Aftermath ==
Henry's premature death left the fragile dual monarchy he had constructed to his infant son Henry VI. When Charles VI died in October 1422 only weeks after Henry, the nine-month-old Henry VI became king of both England and France at least in name. A long minority followed under Henry's brothers John, Duke of Bedford, as regent of France, and Humphrey, Duke of Gloucester, as protector in England. Malcolm Vale regards this as the nearest the two kingdoms came to a workable union. However, the settlement rested on the alliance with the Burgundians, and when they deserted the English at the Congress of Arras in 1435, the arrangement disintegrated. The French enterprise had already been a heavy commitment before Henry died, and over the following thirty years it grew more costly and harder to sustain, until the conquests were lost; only the Pale of Calais remained in English hands until its fall in 1558. Henry VI's loss of his father's gains in France has been tied to the domestic conflict of the decades that followed, eventually culminating in the Wars of the Roses between Henry V's descendants in the House of Lancaster and its rival, the House of York. Thus one of the charges later laid against Henry V was that his conquests had sown "the seeds of defeat overseas and civil war at home".

== Primary sources ==
The principal narrative sources for Henry V's reign were produced within or close to the Lancastrian court and are strongly commemorative in character. The earliest and most important is the Gesta Henrici Quinti, written in 1416–17 by an anonymous author, probably a royal chaplain who had accompanied the 1415 campaign; its modern editors Frank Taylor and John Roskell read it as propaganda intended to support the English delegation at the Council of Constance. A succession of Latin lives followed, borrowing freely from one another: Thomas Elmham's verse Liber Metricus (c. 1418); the Vita Henrici Quinti (late 1430s) of the Italian humanist Tito Livio Frulovisi, written under the patronage of Henry's brother Humphrey, Duke of Gloucester; and the anonymous Vita et Gesta Henrici Quinti, or "Pseudo-Elmham" (mid-1430s). (Note: The composition date of the Vita et Gesta is uncertain. It is dated here to the mid-1430s, following Rundle, who argued that it preceded and was used by Tito Livio's Vita; on the older assumption that it was modelled on Livio, previous authors have instead placed it in the 1440s.) Later still came the First English Life of King Henry the Fifth (1513–14), which drew on Tito Livio and Enguerrand de Monstrelet, and held Henry up as a model warrior-king for Henry VIII. The vernacular Brut Chronicle and the St Albans chronicler Thomas Walsingham struck a similarly celebratory note. Historians read these works as expressions of the regime's preferred image rather than as disinterested records.

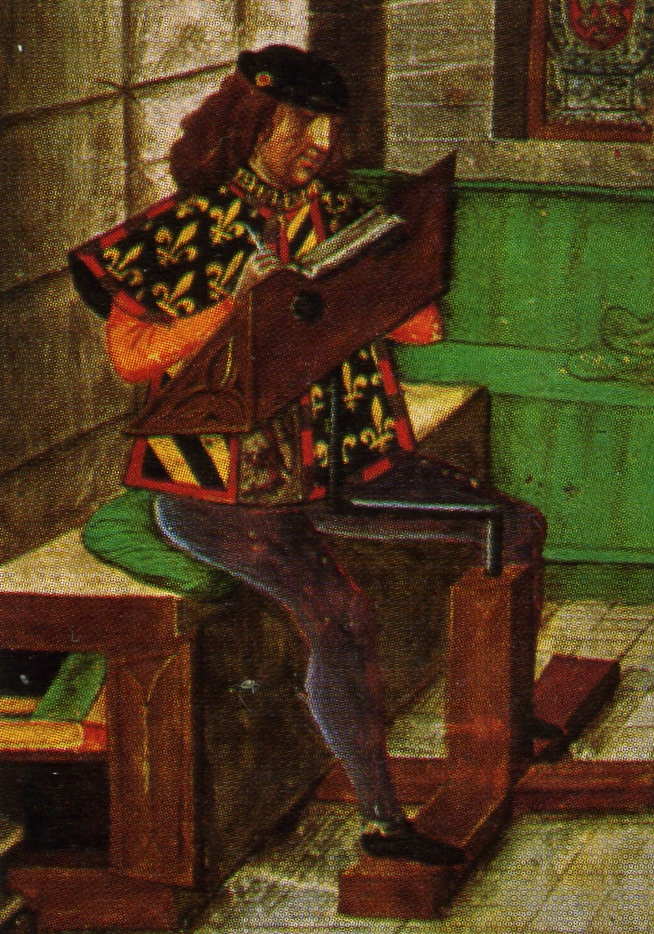
Miniature of chronicler Jean le Fèvre, c.1450

The French and Burgundian chronicles provide an external check, their judgements ranging from open hostility to qualified respect. The Histoire de Charles VI of the chronicler known as the Religieux of Saint-Denis – probably the monk Michel Pintoin – is generally regarded as the best-informed and most balanced of the French accounts. The Burgundian Enguerrand de Monstrelet and the Parisian advocate Jean Juvénal des Ursins were partisan and at times openly hostile, but both were diligent compilers who drew on documentary material. Chroniclers Jean de Wavrin and Jean le Fèvre were present at Agincourt – Wavrin on the French side, le Fèvre with the English – and are valuable eyewitnesses, though each compiled his writings decades after the events. The most hostile French verdicts on Henry, such as those of the Burgundian Georges Chastellain and the Norman Robert Blondel, are best understood as products of the Armagnac–Burgundian conflict in which his memory became entangled.

Because the narrative sources are uniformly partial, modern study draws heavily on records of royal government, which both qualify and corroborate them. The Chancery rolls document Henry's exercise of patronage, the Exchequer records his war finance and military organisation, and the rolls of King's Bench his administration of justice; parliamentary records are thinner, but the chancellors' addresses at the opening of sessions show how the crown presented its policies. Henry's own letters, increasingly written in English, offer rarer glimpses of the king in person. Beneath the commemorative gloss, Matusiak notes, a core of fact survives, above all in this documentary record.

== Reputation ==
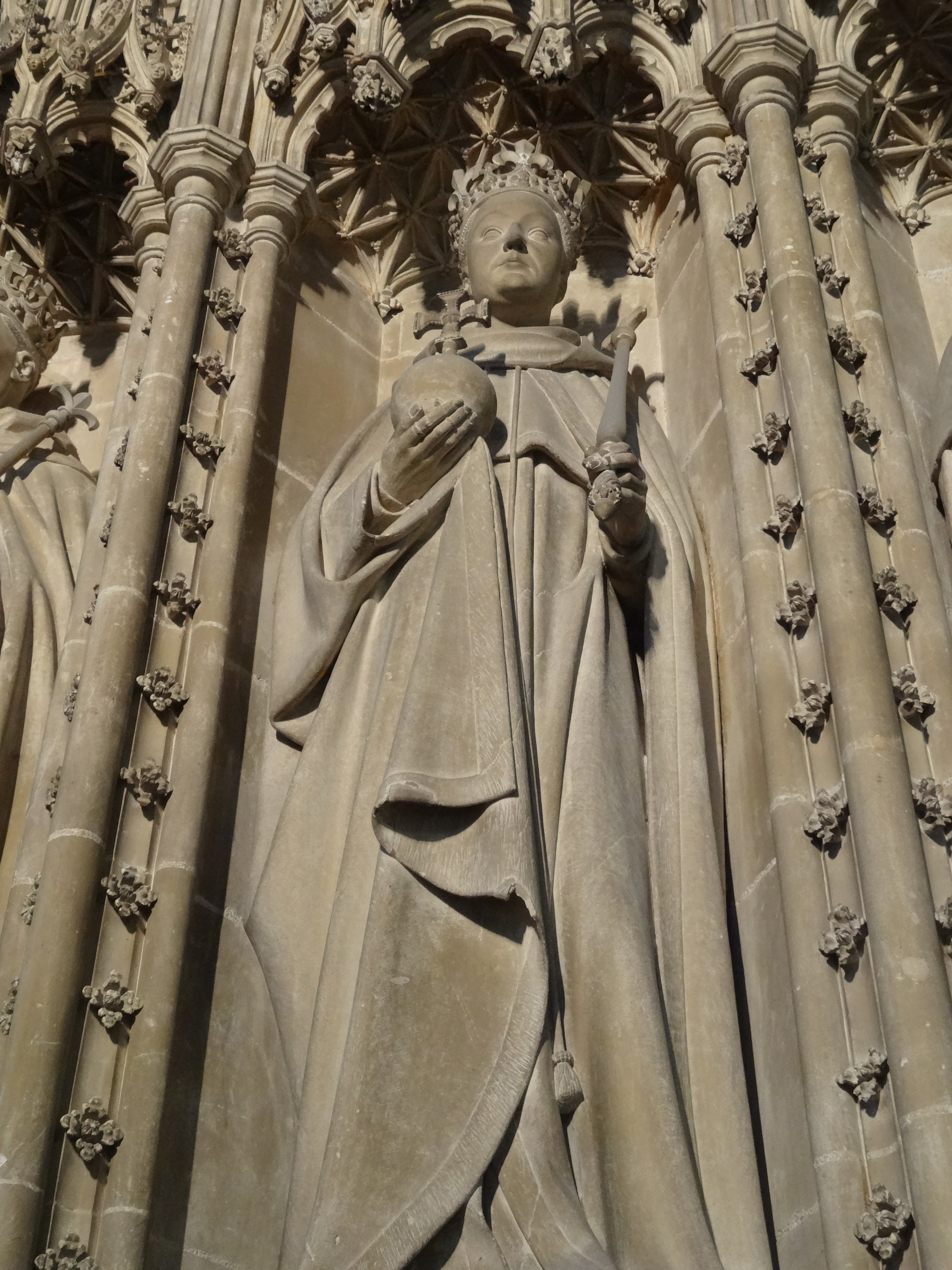
Statue of Henry V in the choir screen at Canterbury Cathedral, c.1450

Contemporary commentary on Henry V was extensive but shaped by political circumstance and, frequently, by direct patronage. In England, praise centred on the image of Henry as a great knight and conqueror. John Lydgate, whose Troy Book had been commissioned by Henry himself in 1412, concluded that work in 1420 by placing the king "in the highest place of the hous [sic] of fame", and his verses on the Kings of England (c.1426) ranked Henry among the Nine Worthies. Thomas Hoccleve, a clerk of the Privy Seal, hailed Henry after the 1420 Treaty of Troyes as the "Swerd of knyghthode" and a "worthy Conqueror". An English eyewitness account of the siege of Rouen (1418–19), conventionally attributed to a "John Page" named in the text, described Henry above all as a "conquerowre", although the historicity of the account remains debated. This image was developed at greater length in the Latin biographies produced by chroniclers such as Thomas Elmham and Tito Livio Frulovisi. French and Burgundian assessments were more divided. The Religieux of Saint-Denis credited Henry with "magnanimity, prudence and wisdom", judging him better equipped than any prince of his age to conquer a kingdom, and Burgundian chroniclers Jean de Wavrin and Jean Le Fèvre praised him for maintaining his armies' "discipline of knighthood" in a manner reminiscent of ancient Rome. Other voices were more critical: Enguerrand de Monstrelet claimed there was widespread fear of Henry in France, Georges Chastellain portrayed him as a tyrant driven by vainglory, and Robert Blondel interpreted Henry's early death as divine punishment for his brutality.

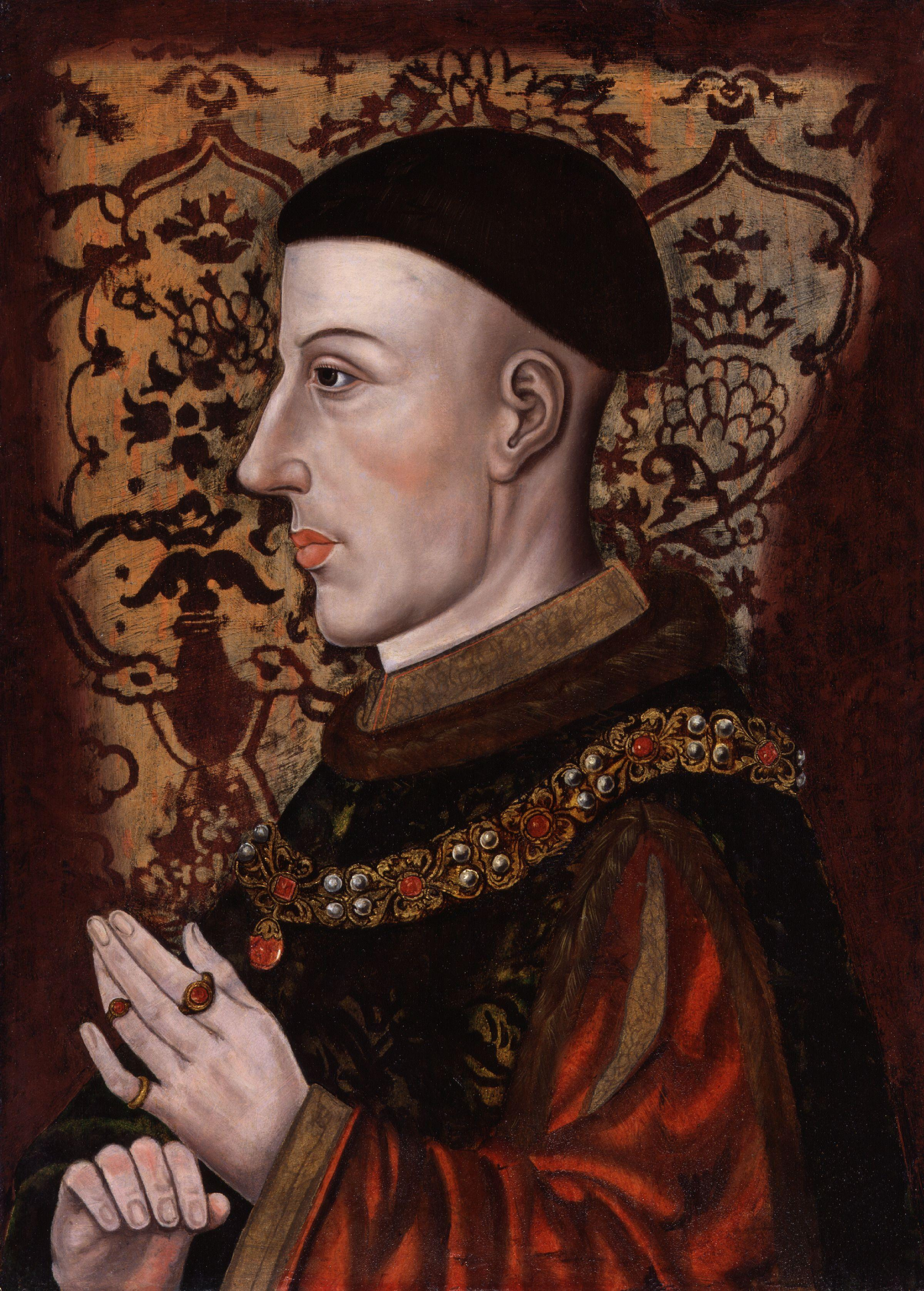
Portrait of Henry by an unknown artist, late 16th or early 17th century

Henry V's later reputation rested chiefly on his record as a soldier. Allmand observes that "ever since his own day there has been virtual unanimity" on his ability as a military commander, and contemporary English writing established the image of a disciplined, divinely supported conqueror that later authors inherited. The Tudor chronicle tradition, culminating in Raphael Holinshed, developed Henry further into "more like a moral stereotype than a historical figure of flesh and blood", and it was principally from Holinshed that Shakespeare drew the material for Henry V, the play that has since dominated popular perception of the king.

Modern scholarship shows an unusually wide range of verdicts on Henry. Even his sternest critics believe him to be a gifted soldier and administrator, but there is disagreement over the use he made of those gifts, and over whether he should be judged by the standards of his own age or those of a later one. At one extreme stands K. B. McFarlane's classic verdict of 1972 that Henry was "the greatest man that ever ruled England", an estimate echoed by Dan Jones, Maurice Keen, and Anne Curry, who has called him the "golden boy" of 15th-century history. At the other end, historian Ian Mortimer has cast Henry as deeply flawed and as proof that "a man may be a hero and yet a monster", while A. J. Pollard, in an avowedly opinionated study, judges him a "warmonger" who grew increasingly tyrannical and whose over-reaching ambition left his realm bankrupt and his dynasty fatally weakened. French historians, when they treat him at all, have inclined to the same severity, in a tradition reaching back to Édouard Perroy.

Between these poles, recent work has reframed the debate around the French war and its legacy. Following E. F. Jacob, Allmand describes Henry's bequest to his infant son as a damnosa hereditas (harmful inheritance); within a generation, the conquest had become "an ever increasing political and financial liability". John Matusiak has questioned the assumption that this collapse was inevitable, arguing that the loss of France turned on contingent events after Henry's death, such as that of Charles VI in October 1422; Normandy was held for a decade, and in 1429 the siege of Orléans came close to a decisive English victory. For Matusiak the war was purposeful rather than reckless, with Henry's governance, diplomacy and warfare forming "part of an integrated whole". Malcolm Vale goes further, holding that the Shakespearean image of a "warmongering monarch" obscures Henry's durable achievements at home and doubting that the dual monarchy was inherently unsustainable. Allmand's own summation, weighing the reign in full, is favourable: he argues the king's political skills were most apparent at home rather than in France, and he emerges as a more complex figure than the soldier of popular memory, his stature raised rather than diminished by the wider view.

== Cultural depictions ==
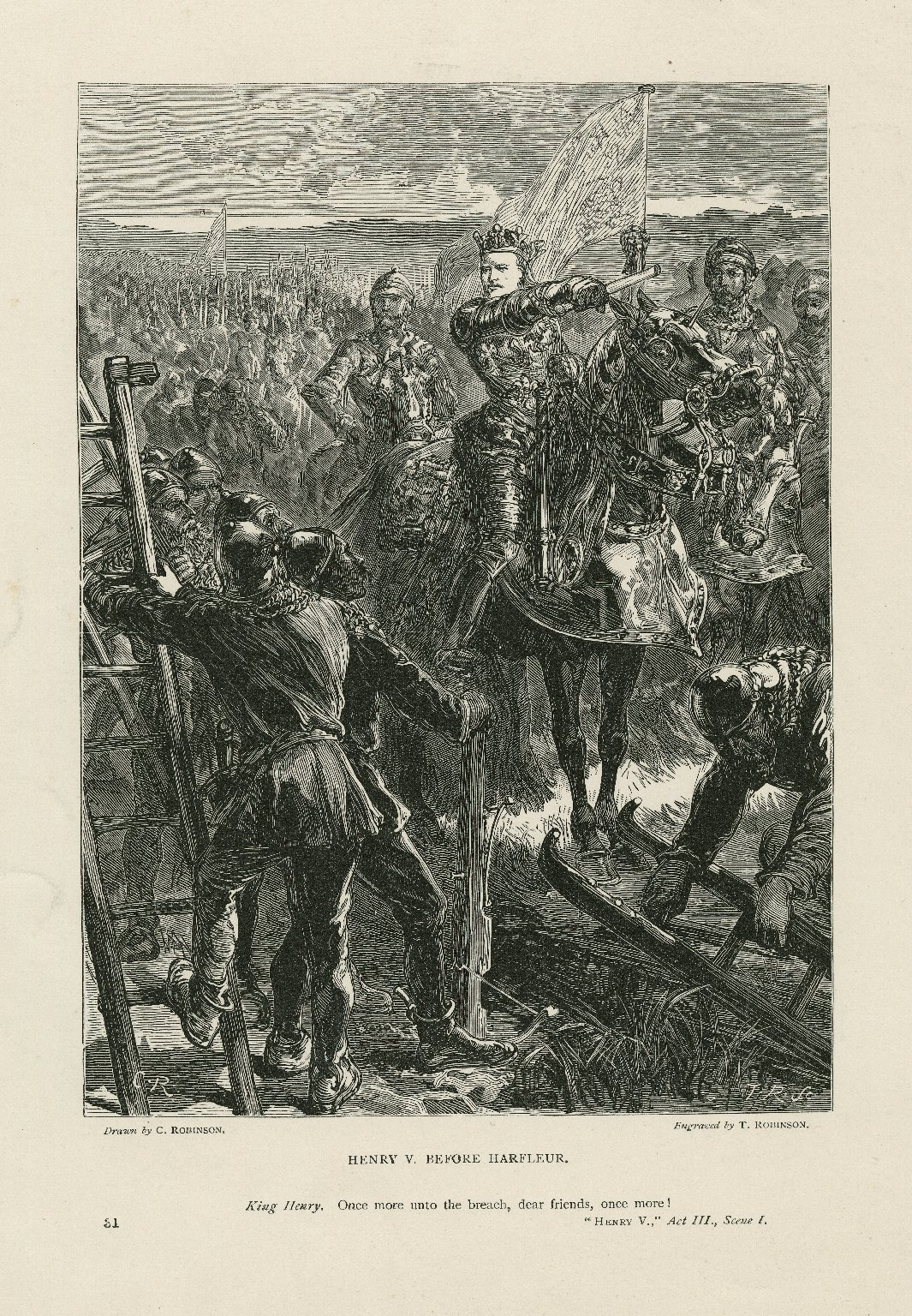
Henry at the siege of Harfleur in a scene from Shakespeare's Henry V, 19th-century engraving after C. Robinson

The most famous and influential depiction of Henry V comes from William Shakespeare's series of historical plays Henry IV, Part 1; Henry IV, Part 2; and Henry V – along with Richard II, these are known collectively as the Henriad in Shakespearean scholarship.

Shakespeare's plays dramatise Henry's transformation from the young and reckless Prince Hal into a virtuous ruler who wins France for England, but there is little contemporary evidence for Henry's supposed riotous youth. The nearest thing to evidence comes from the Bishop of Norwich, Richard Courtenay, who wrote that the king had given up youthful pursuits and become chaste on his accession – though as a longtime friend of Henry's, Courtenay is a suspect witness. Shakespeare's character of Falstaff – an important figure in the Henriad – originated in Henry's early friendship with Sir John Oldcastle, and was originally named "Oldcastle" as in Shakespeare's main source, The Famous Victories of Henry V. Oldcastle's descendants objected, and the name was changed (the character became a composite of several real persons, including Sir John Fastolf).

In film and television, Henry V has been portrayed by actors such as Laurence Olivier in the 1944 film Henry V, for which he was nominated for the Academy Award for Best Actor; Keith Baxter in Orson Welles's 1966 film Chimes at Midnight; Kenneth Branagh in the 1989 film Henry V, for which he was nominated for the Academy Award for Best Actor, Best Director, and the BAFTA Award for Best Actor in a Leading Role; and more recently, Tom Hiddleston in the 2012 BBC television series The Hollow Crown, and Timothée Chalamet in the 2019 Netflix film The King.

== Arms ==
Henry's arms as Prince of Wales were those of the kingdom, differenced by a label argent of three points. Upon his accession, he inherited the use of the arms of the kingdom undifferenced.

Coats of arms of Henry V of England

Henry's achievement as Prince of Wales.

Royal achievement as king.

== Marriage ==
In 1396, Richard II had intended to strengthen the truce between England and France with his marriage to Isabella of Valois, second daughter of Charles VI. During the marriage negotiations, it was also suggested that ten-year-old Henry marry either Isabella's infant sister Michelle of Valois, or alternatively Marie of Brittany, a daughter of John IV, Duke of Brittany. Both matches failed to materialise. While he was Prince of Wales, there was a suggestion that Henry should marry Isabella of Valois – now the widow of Richard II – but this was also rejected.

Following Henry's accession, marriage seemingly assumed a lower priority until the conclusion of the Treaty of Troyes, which provided for Henry to marry Catherine of Valois, youngest daughter of Charles VI and younger sister of Isabella, in June 1420. Henry had first met Catherine during negotiations in Meulan in 1419, where she was described as a tall and "very handsome" girl of "most engaging manners". The couple had one child: the future Henry VI of England, born in December 1421, who was less than a year old at the time of Henry's death in 1422.

== Ancestry and family ==
Ancestors of Henry V of England

8. Edward III of England
4. John of Gaunt, 1st Duke of Lancaster
9. Philippa of Hainault
2. Henry IV of England
10. Henry of Grosmont, 1st Duke of Lancaster
5. Blanche of Lancaster
11. Isabel of Beaumont
1. Henry V of England
12. William de Bohun, 1st Earl of Northampton
6. Humphrey de Bohun, 7th Earl of Hereford
13. Elizabeth de Badlesmere
3. Mary de Bohun
14. Richard Fitzalan, 10th Earl of Arundel
7. Joan FitzAlan
15. Eleanor of Lancaster

English royal families in the Wars of the Roses

Dukes (except Aquitaine) and Princes of Wales are noted, as are the monarchs' reigns.
†=Killed in action; =Executed
See also Family tree of English monarchs

Henry of Grosmont; Duke of Lancaster	Edward III; King of England r. 1327–1377
Edward of Woodstock "The Black Prince"; Prince of Wales	Thomas of Woodstock; Duke of Gloucester	Blanche of Lancaster	John of Gaunt; Duke of Lancaster	Katherine Swynford	Edmund of Langley; Duke of York	Lionel of Antwerp; Duke of Clarence
Edward of Angoulême	Richard II; Prince of Wales, King of England r. 1377–1399	Henry IV; Duke of Lancaster, King of England r. 1399–1413	John Beaufort	Thomas Beaufort; Duke of Exeter	Joan Beaufort	Ralph Neville	Philippa of Clarence
Owen Tudor; Lancastrian	Catherine of Valois	Henry V Duke of Lancaster, Prince of Wales, King of England r. 1413–1422	Humphrey; Duke of Gloucester	Henry Percy "Hotspur"	Elizabeth Mortimer	Roger Mortimer
Edward of Norwich; Duke of York	Richard of Conisburgh	Anne de Mortimer
John Beaufort; Duke of Somerset; Lancastrian	Margaret of Anjou; Lancastrian	Henry VI; King of England r. 1422–1461, r. 1470–1471; Lancastrian	Edmund Beaufort; Duke of Somerset; Lancastrian †1st St Albans	William Neville; Yorkist	Anne Neville	Henry Percy; Lancastrian †1st St Albans	Eleanor Neville	Richard Neville; Yorkist; (executed) Wakefield	Cecily Neville	Richard of York; Duke of York, Prince of Wales; Yorkist †Wakefield
Henry Beaufort; Duke of Somerset; Lancastrian; (executed) Hexham	Richard Woodville; (executed) Edgecote	Edmund Beaufort; Duke of Somerset; Lancastrian; (executed) Tewkesbury	Margaret Beaufort	Humphrey Stafford	Henry Percy; Lancastrian †Towton	John Neville; Yorkist, then Lancastrian †Barnet	Richard Neville "Kingmaker"; Yorkist, then Lancastrian †Barnet
Margaret Beaufort; Lancastrian	Edmund Tudor; Lancastrian	Jasper Tudor; Duke of Bedford; Lancastrian	Catherine Woodville	Henry Stafford; Duke of Buckingham; Yorkist, then Lancastrian (executed)	Elizabeth Woodville	Edward IV; Duke of York, King of England r. 1461–1470, r. 1471–1483; Yorkist	George Plantagenet; Duke of Clarence; Yorkist, then Lancastrian; (executed) Tower	Edward of Westminster; Prince of Wales; Lancastrian †Tewkesbury	Anne Neville	Richard III; Duke of Gloucester, King of England r. 1483–1485; Yorkist †Bosworth Field
Henry VII; King of England; Lancastrian r. 1485–1509	Elizabeth of York	Edward V Prince of Wales, King of England r. 1483; Yorkist; (executed) Tower	Richard of Shrewsbury; Duke of York; (executed) Tower

== See also ==
- Dafydd Gam, Welsh warrior who died at Agincourt
- Dieu et mon droit, royal motto adopted by Henry V
- Dual monarchy of England and France
- Hundred Years' War, 1415–1453
- List of earls in the reign of Henry V of England
- Oldcastle Revolt, Lollard uprising during Henry V's reign

== Bibliography ==
- Andrews, Allen (1976). Kings and Queens of England and Scotland. London: Marshall Cavendish Publications.
- Allmand, Christopher (1992). Henry V. London: Methuen London. ISBN 9780413532800.
- Barker, Juliet (2005). Agincourt: Henry V and the Battle That Made England. London: Little, Brown.
- Brenton Kerr, Wilfred (1 July 1943). "Agincourt and Valmont: Contrast in the Tactics of French and English during Henry V's Invasions of France". Journal of the Society for Army Historical Research. 22 (86): 66–70. JSTOR 44221814.
- Bove, Boris (1 December 2010). "Deconstructing the chronicles: rumours and extreme violence during the siege of Meaux (1421-1422)" (PDF). French History. 24 (4): 501–523. doi:10.1093/fh/crq055. ISSN 0269-1191.
- Brooks, Douglas A. (1998). "Sir John Oldcastle and the Construction of Shakespeare's Authorship". Studies in English Literature, 1500-1900. 38 (2): 333–361. doi:10.2307/451041. ISSN 0039-3657.
- Calderwood, James L. (1979). Metadrama in Shakespeare's Henriad: Richard II to Henry V. Berkeley: Univ. of California Press. ISBN 978-0-520-03652-9.
- Curry, Anne (2005). Agincourt: A New History. Stroud: Tempus.
- Curry, Anne (2009). The Battle of Agincourt: Sources and Interpretations. Warfare in History. Woodbridge: Boydell Press.
- Curry, Anne (2013). "The Making of a Prince: The Finances of "the young lord Henry", 1386–1400". In Gwilym Dodd (ed.). Henry V: New Interpretations. York Medieval Press. ISBN 978-1-9031-5346-8.
- Curry, Anne (2015). Henry V: Playboy Prince to Warrior King. London: Allan Lane. ISBN 978-0-141-97871-0.
- Dockray, Keith (2004). Warrior King: The Life of Henry V. Stroud: Tempus Publishing. ISBN 978-0-7524-3046-1.
- Dodd, Gwilym (2013). "Henry V's Establishment". In Dodd, Gwilym (ed.). Henry V: New Interpretations. Woodbridge: York Medieval Press.
- Ebert, Roger (4 June 2006). "A Wellesian Falstaff". www.rogerebert.com.
- Erler, Mary (2003). "Hoccleve's Portrait? in British Library Manuscript Arundel 38" (PDF). The Ricardian. 13: 221–228.
- Fisher, John H. (1996). The Emergence of Standard English. University Press of Kentucky. ISBN 978-0-8131-0852-0.
- Fraser, Antonia (2000). A Royal History of England – The Wars of the Roses I. Los Angeles & Berkeley: University of California Press. ISBN 978-0-520-22802-3.
- Gransden, Antonia (1982). Historical Writing in England II. London: Routledge.
- Harriss, Gerald Leslie, ed. (1985). Henry V: The Practice of Kingship. Oxford University Press.
- Harriss, Gerald Leslie (2005). Shaping the Nation: England 1360–1461. Oxford, England: Oxford University Press. ISBN 0-1982-2816-3.
- Harvey, John Hooper (1967). The Plantagenets. London: Collins.
- Hibbert, Christopher (1964). Agincourt. London: Batsford.
- Jones, Dan (2024). Henry V: The Astonishing Triumph of England's Greatest Warrior King. London: Viking.
- Keen, Maurice (1985). "Diplomacy". In Harriss, G. L. (ed.). Henry V: The Practice of Kingship. Oxford: Oxford University Press. pp. 181–199.
- Kernan, Alvin (1970). "The Henriad: Shakespeare's Major History Plays". In Kernan, Alvin (ed.). Modern Shakespearean Criticism. New York: Harcourt, Brace & World.
- King, Andy (2020). "'Then a great misfortune befell them': the laws of war on surrender and the killing of prisoners on the battlefield in the Hundred Years War". In Ambühl, Rémy; Lambert, Craig (eds.). Agincourt in Context: War on Land and Sea. London: Routledge.
- Kingsford, Charles (1901). Henry V: The Typical Mediæval Hero. London: GP Putnam's Sons.
- Labarge, Margaret Wade (1976). Henry V: The Cautious Conqueror. New York: Stein and Day.
- Lang, S. J. (1992). "John Bradmore and His Book Philomena". Social History of Medicine. 5 (1). doi:10.1093/shm/5.1.121. PMID 11612773.
- Livingstone, Michael (2019). "Curing a Royal Head-Wound (1403)". In Livingstone, Michael; DeVries, Kelly (eds.). Medieval Warfare: A Reader. Toronto: University of Toronto Press.
- Matusiak, John (2012). Henry V. London: Routledge. ISBN 978-0415620277.
- McFarlane, Kenneth Bruce (1972). Lancastrian Kings and Lollard Knights. Oxford: Clarendon Press. ISBN 978-0198223443.
- Mowat, Robert Balmain (1919). Henry V. London: John Constable. p. 176.
- Mortimer, Ian (2007). The Fears of Henry IV: The Life of England's Self-Made King. London: Jonathan Cape. ISBN 978-0-2240-7300-4.
- Mugglestone, Lydia (2006). The Oxford History of English. Oxford: Oxford University Press. ISBN 0-19-924931-8.
- Page, John; Bellis, Joanna (2015). John Page's The Siege of Rouen. Middle English Texts. Heidelberg: Universitätsverlag Winter.
- Patterson, Annabel (1996). "Sir John Oldcastle and Reformation histiography". In Hamilton, Donna; Strier, Richard (eds.). Religion, literature, and politics in post-Reformation England, 1540–1688. Cambridge: Cambridge University Press. ISBN 0-521-47456-6.
- Pearsall, Derek (1997). John Lydgate (1371–1449): A Bio-Bibliography. Greater Victoria: English Literary Studies, University of Victoria.
- Pfeiffer, Lee (nd). "Henry V, film by Olivier [1044]". Encyclopedia Britannica.
- Pollard, Anthony James (2014). Henry V. pocket GIANTS. Stroud: The History Press. ISBN 978-0-7524-9763-1.
- Powell, Edward (1989). Kingship, Law, and Society: Criminal Justice in the Reign of Henry V. Oxford: Clarendon Press.
- Richardson, Douglas (2011). Everingham, Kimball (ed.). Plantagenet Ancestry. Vol. 2 (2nd ed.). Salt Lake City.
- Rundle, D. (2008). "The Unoriginality of Tito Livio Frulovisi's Vita Henrici Quinti". English Historical Review. cxxiii: 1109–1131.
- Seward, Desmond (1999). The hundred years war: The English in France 1337–1453. Harmondsworth: Penguin Books. ISBN 0-14-028361-7.
- Strohm, Paul (1999). "Hoccleve, Lydgate and the Lancastrian court". The Cambridge History of Medieval English Literature. Cambridge: Cambridge University Press.
- Strong, Roy (1969). Tudor and Jacobean Portraits. London: HM Stationery Office.
- Taylor, Frank; Roskell, John Smith, eds. (1975). Gesta Henrici Quinti: The Deeds of Henry the Fifth. Oxford Medieval Texts. Oxford: Clarendon Press.
- Taylor, Craig (2013). "Henry V, Flower of Chivalry". In Dodd, Gwilym (ed.). Henry V: New Interpretations. Woodbridge: York Medieval Press.
- Vale, Malcolm (2016). Henry V: The Conscience of a King. New Haven, CT: Yale University Press.
- Weir, Alison (2008). Britain's Royal Families: The Complete Genealogy. London: Vintage. ISBN 978-0-09-953973-5.
- Weis, René (1998). Henry IV, part 2. Oxford: Oxford University Press. ISBN 0-19-283143-7.
- Williamson, David (2010). Kings and Queens. London: National Portrait Gallery.

Henry V of England House of Lancaster Cadet branch of the House of Plantagenet Born: 16 September 1386 Died: 31 August 1422
Regnal titles
Preceded by Henry IV	King of England; Lord of Ireland; 1413–1422	Succeeded by Henry VI
Preceded by Henry IV	Duke of Aquitaine; 1400–1422	Succeeded by Henry VI
Peerage of England
Vacant Title last held by English title: Richard of Bordeaux; Welsh title: Dafydd ap Gruffudd (1283)	Prince of Wales; 1399–1413	Vacant Title next held by English title: Edward of Westminster; Welsh title:Owain Glyndwr (Pretender 1400/15)
Vacant Title last held by Richard of Bordeaux	Duke of Cornwall; 1399–1413	Vacant Title next held by Henry of Windsor
Preceded by Henry Bolingbroke	Duke of Lancaster; 1399–1413	Merged in Crown
Honorary titles
Preceded by Sir Thomas Erpynham	Lord Warden of the Cinque Ports; 1409–1412	Succeeded by The Earl of Arundel
