= Treaty of Paris (1259) =

Preface to The Treaty of Paris 1259

The Treaty of Paris, also known as the Treaty of Abbeville, was signed on 4 December 1259 by King Louis IX of France and King Henry III of England. It marked a turning point in European politics, leading to new political dynamics, cultural exchanges, and social changes.

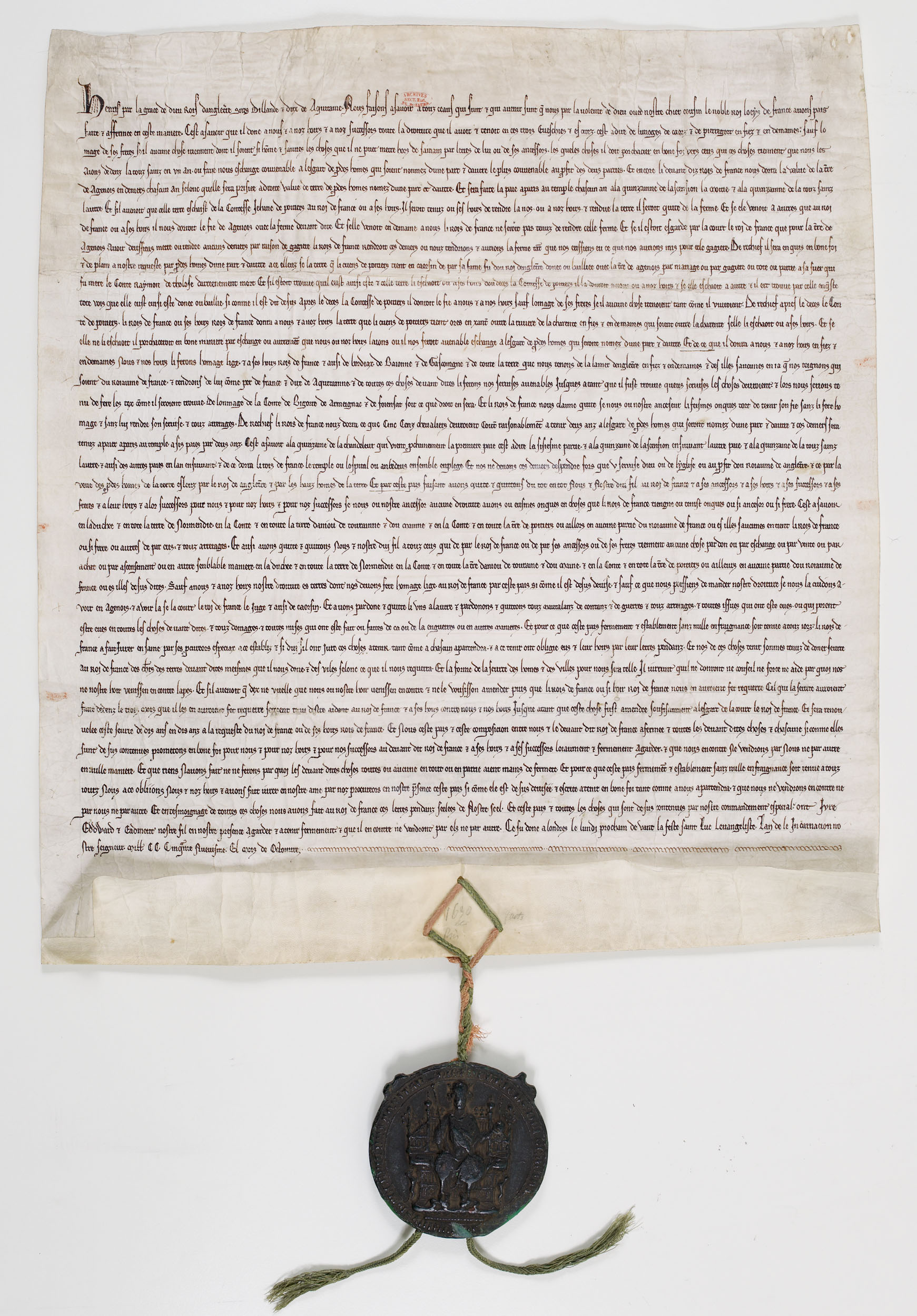
Ratification of the Treaty of Paris by Henry III, 13 October 1259. Archives Nationales (France).

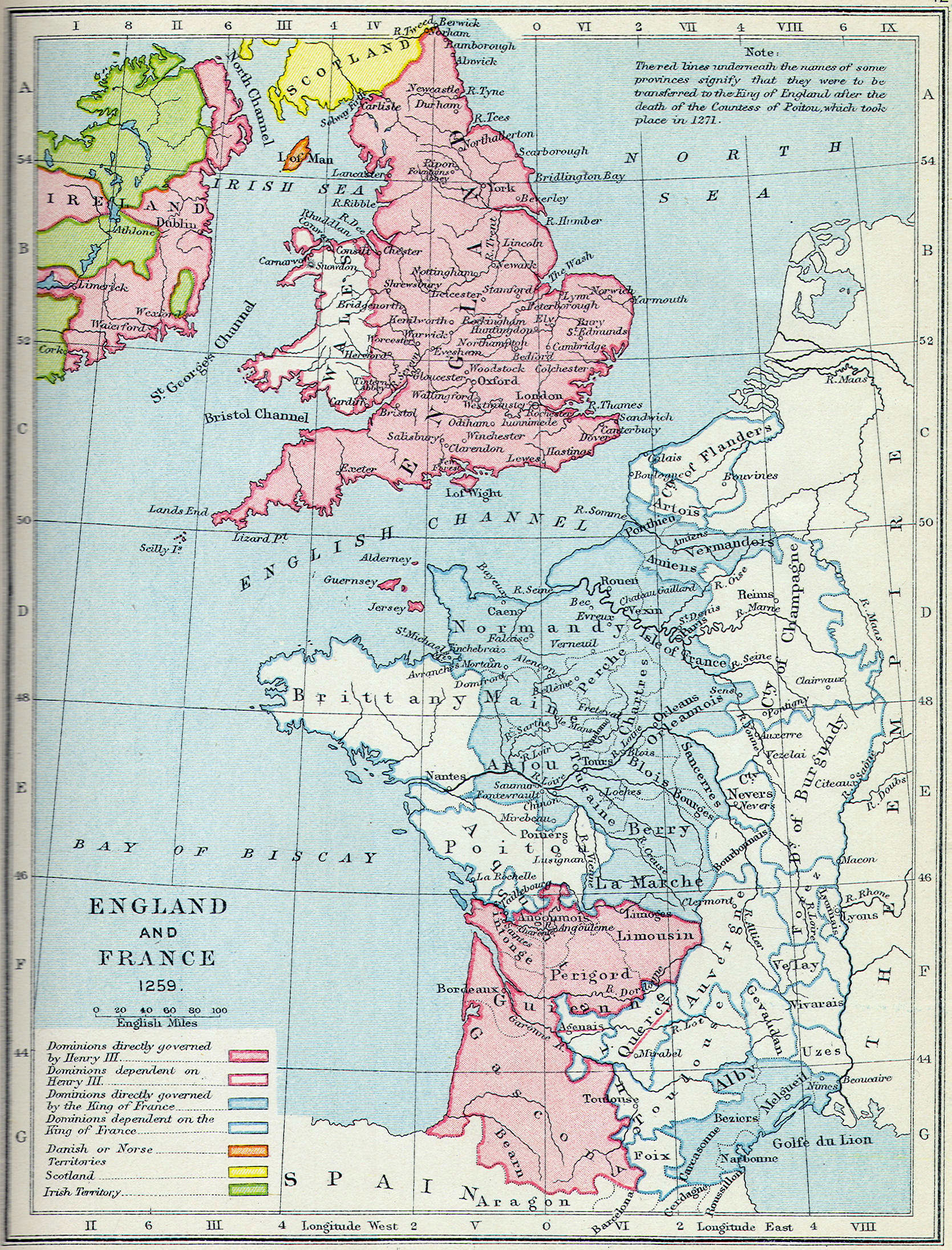
The English Angevin Empire and France after the 1259 Treaty of Paris.

== Background ==
This era held monumental significance in certain regions, particularly in Paris, which was considered “scarcely inferior to Rome” and recognized as one of the most important cities in Europe. Paris’ role as the seat of Europe’s oldest university, established to study God’s dealings with mankind, reinforced its cultures and intellectual importance. This focus on Paris also draws connections to Britain's own centers of learning and power, such as Oxford, Canterbury, York, Lincoln, and Ely. These locations highlight broader issues of the time; issues that shaped the larger European framework, including political sovereignty, economic wealth, and England's cultural integration into the wider European scene.

== Historical context ==
The Norman Conquest of England in 1066 by William the Conqueror, Duke of Normandy, created an awkward situation whereby the kings of England were sovereign over some of their territory but bound by homage to the kings of France for other rich and well-populated lands on the Continent. William attempted to separate the two areas between his heirs, but subsequent fighting and inheritance not only reunited England and Normandy but greatly expanded English territory within France. King John's refusal to answer Philip II of France for the apparent murder of his teenage nephew Arthur gave Philip a pretext for recovering Normandy in 1204. The English recovered the Channel Islands and remained in control of Aquitaine, however, and, despite the 1217 Treaty of Lambeth, both the English and French kings continually engaged in wars of conquest and reconquest over Normandy and their borderlands.

== Terms ==
The Treaty of Paris ushered in an era of peace between England and France, after decades of conflict stemming back to 1202. The treaty itself was ultimately a set of guarantees between the two kingdoms, the largest of which was a mutual forgiveness between both kingdoms for actions committed against one another. Both Henry and Louis made the promise to uphold the treaty and to ensure those promises were being held roughly every ten years.

Under the treaty, Henry acknowledged the loss of the Duchy of Normandy. Henry agreed to renounce control of Maine, Anjou, Touraine and Poitou, which had also been lost under the reign of King John, but Henry remained Duke of Aquitaine as a vassal to Louis. In exchange, Louis withdrew his support for English rebels. He also ceded to Henry the bishoprics and cities of Limoges, Cahors, and Périgueux and was to pay an annual rent for his continued occupation of Agenais. Louis also ceded the regions of Agenais, Saintonge, and Quercy over to Henry, which would help bolster the English rule in Gascony.

By rule of the treaty, Louis recognized Henry's direct rule over the Duchy of Aquitaine so long as Henry paid a liege homage to the King of France. Under this rule of homage, Henry was unable to offer any form of aid to those deemed as enemies of the King of France, causing a ripple between previous alliances forged by Henry. Despite Henry signing off on the treaty with the act of homage in mind, those within the duchy of Aquitaine greatly opposed the treaty due to the sovereignty Louis was given over the duchy. Under the order of the treaty, the King of France could exercise complete legal jurisdiction over the duchy allowing for those in the duchy to take their legal disputes to the Paris Parlement. An act which would only lead to increased conflicts between the two kingdoms due to the frequent overlapping of the two forms of government.

Despite acknowledging the loss of Normandy, the treaty separately held that "islands (if any) which the King of England should hold" would be retained by him "as peer of France and Duke of Aquitaine". Along with subsequent English denunciations of their French vassalage, this formed the basis of the special situation of the Channel Islands (Jersey, Guernsey, Alderney, Sark, and some smaller islands), which have been held directly by the English Crown without formal incorporation into the Kingdom of England or its successor states.

== Aftermath ==
Doubts on the treaty's interpretation began almost as soon as it was signed. The agreement continued the unstable situation whereby English monarchs were obliged to submit to the French kings for disputes over their territories on the continent. The French historian Édouard Perroy considered that the Treaty of Paris "was at the very root of the Hundred Years' War."

Furthermore, it wasn't long after the Treaty of Paris was signed that Henry III attempted to retain his power. The Parliament Prohibited document, a letter from Henry III to the archbishop of Canterbury expressing that without the king's consent or without his presence, Parliament could not be held. This was in response to the Oxford Parliament (1258), which requested the king to make decisions according to the order of the Barons.

However, that’s not to say the Treaty of Paris didn’t come with its benefits for Henry III. In 1264, Louis IX gave a settlement in favor of the king known as the Mise of Amiens. When the barons agreed to meet with Louis IX after repeated rejection of their meetings by Henry III, they agreed to abide by whatever his decision was about the Provisions of Oxford. Louis ruled unquestionably in favor of the king because of their current allyship brought about by the Treaty of Paris, declaring that the barons had committed treason, and thus, had to leave the government the way it was pre-1258. This, however, would lead to the Second Barons’ War as the barons fought to keep the provisions. Scholar M.T Clanchy argues this may have been the result of the Treaty of Paris, or perhaps Louis IX noticing that his monarchy is being challenged by these provisions as well.

The rebellious barons' leaders, Simon de Montfort, 6th Earl of Leicester, along with his son Henry, would be killed by Edward I in Battle of Evesham. Shortly after this battle, while in captivity of his rebellious barons, Henry III passed the Dictum of Kenilworth, in 1265, a pronouncement that claimed anyone who lost their land in war would have it returned after the fact. Modern historians argue that, while this was indeed a way to end the conflict between Henry III and his Barons, it also was made to show Henry III still had the power to give and take away from his Barons, even when in captivity.

== See also ==
- List of treaties
