= Thomas Elmham =

English chronicler (1364–c.1427)

Thomas Elmham (1364 – in or after 1427) was an English chronicler.

== Life ==
Thomas Elmham was probably born at North Elmham in Norfolk. He may have been the Thomas Elmham who was a scholar at King's Hall, Cambridge from 1389 to 1394. He became a Benedictine monk at Canterbury, and then joining the Cluniacs, was prior of Lenton Priory, near Nottingham; he was chaplain to Henry V, whom he may have accompanied to France in 1415, and may have been present at the Battle of Agincourt.

== Works ==
Elmham wrote a history of the monastery of St. Augustine at Canterbury, which was edited by Charles Hardwick for the Rolls Series (1858); and a Liber metricus de Henrico V, edited by C. A. Cole in the Memorials of Henry V (1858). As well as this verse life of Henry V, Elmham himself says he wrote a prose biography of the king. The eighteenth-century editor of the Vita et Gesta Henrici V, Thomas Hearne, made a claim for Elmham's authorship of that biography but, in fact, it was written in the mid-1430s, long after Elmham's death. The attribution was rejected by the early twentieth century and the Vita et Gesta since then has gone by the designation of "Pseudo-Elmham" (this biography was the main source of the Vita Henrici Quinti by Tito Livio Frulovisi). In the early twentieth century, it was suggested instead that Elmham's prose life could be equated with the Gesta Henrici Quinti, which is the best authority for the life of Henry V from his accession to 1416. This work, sometimes referred to as the chaplain's life, and thought by some to have been written by Jean de Bordin, was first published for the English Historical Society by B. Williams (1850). However, the modern editors of the Gesta convincingly rejected this attribution to Elmham. In short, the prose life by Thomas Elmham is not known to survive.

== Literature ==
- C. L. Kingsford, "The Early Biographies of Henry V", English Historical Review, xxv (1910), pp. 58–92.
- F. Taylor & J. S. Roskell ed., Gesta Henrici Quinti (Oxford, 1975), pp. xviii – xxiii and iid., "The Authorship and Purpose of the Gesta Henrici Quinti: I", Bulletin of the John Rylands Library, liii (1970–71), pp. 428–464.
