= Tito Livio Frulovisi =

Italian humanist scholar

Decorated initial at the start of the Vita Henrici Quinti in Frulovisi's autograph manuscript

A dragon incorporated into a decorated initial at the start of the only surviving manuscript of Frulovisi' comedies

Tito Livio Frulovisi (fl. 1430s–1440s) was a humanist scholar and author, who is best known for his biography of King Henry V of England in Latin, the Vita Henrici Quinti.

== Life and work ==
Frulovisi was from Ferrara and grew up in Venice. It was there that he wrote his first works, a set of comedies which were performed by schoolboys. They were some of the first examples of this genre in Renaissance Italy. In the early 1430s, Frulovisi travelled to Naples and then returned north to his hometown of Ferrara. There he sought employment at the court of the ruling d'Este dynasty, in 1434 dedicating to them his dialogue on government, De Republica. He may also have written there two further comedies.

He did not stay there for long, however; he travelled across the Alps, reaching England probably in 1436. He was employed in the household of Humphrey, Duke of Gloucester, and wrote for him both a Latin poem celebrating the duke's martial exploits, Humfrois, and a biography of Humfrey's late brother, Henry V of England. This latter work, the Vita Henrici Quinti, is the work for which Frulovisi is best known; it has long been considered the earliest posthumous biography of Henry V, though, in fact, it was heavily derivative of another work, the Vita et Gesta Henrici Quinti, once ascribed to Thomas Elmham. The only published edition of Frulovisi's Vita is that made by Thomas Hearne in the eighteenth century. It was also translated into Italian in the fifteenth century by Pier Candido Decembrio and into English in the first years of the reign of Henry VIII.

Once again, Frulovisi did not stay long in his place of residence: he left England for good in 1440, and returned to Italy. He was for a time in Milan and then journeyed to Barcelona, via Toulouse. There is little information about his later years, though it appears that he trained as a medical doctor.

== Works ==
- C. W. Previté-Orton ed., Opera hactenus inedita T. Livii de Frulovisiis de Ferraria (Cambridge, 1932).
- Tito Livio Frulovisi, Oratoria, ed. Cristina Cocco (Florence: Sismel - Edizioni del Galluzzo, 2010). (it:Società internazionale per lo studio del Medioevo latino)
- Tito Livio Frulovisi, Emporia, ed. Clara Fossati (Florence: Sismel - Edizioni del Galluzzo, 2014) (it:Società internazionale per lo studio del Medioevo latino)
- Tito Livio Frulovisi, Claudi duo, ed. Valentina Incardona (Florence: Sismel - Edizioni del Galluzzo, 2011)
- Tito Livio Frulovisi, Peregrinatio, ed. Clara Fossati (Florence: Sismel - Edizioni del Galluzzo, 2012) (it:Società internazionale per lo studio del Medioevo latino)
- Tito Livio Frulovisi, Hunfreidos, ed. Cristina Cocco (Florence: Sismel-Edizioni del Galluzzo, 2015) (Il Ritorno dei Classici nell'Umanesimo- Edizione Nazionale dei testi della Storiografia Umanistica IX)
- Tito Livio Frulovisi, Corallaria, ed. Armando Bisanti (Florence: Sismel-Edizioni del Galluzzo, 2021) (Teatro Umanistico, 19)

== Sources ==
- G. Arbizzoni, ‘Frulovisi, Tito Livio de’’ in Dizionario biografico degli Italiani, l (Roma, 1998), pp. 646 – 50.
- R. Sabbadini, ‘Tito Livio Frulovisio umanista del sec. XV’, Giornale storico della Letteratura italiana, ciii (1934), pp. 55 – 81.
- M. L. King, Venetian Humanism in an Age of Patrician Dominance, (Princeton, 1986), pp. 377 – 78.
- D. Rundle, ‘Tito Livio Frulovisi, and the place of comedies in the formation of a humanist’s career’, Studi Umanistici Piceni, xxiv (2004), pp. 193 – 202.
- D. Rundle, 'The Unoriginality of Tito Livio Frulovisi's Vita Henrici Quinti', English Historical Review, cxxiii (2008), pp. 1109 – 1131.
- D. Rundle, The Renaissance Reform of the Book and Britain (Cambridge, 2019), pp. 41-47.
