= List of earls in the reign of Henry V of England =

This is a list of Earls (suo jure or jure uxoris) during the reign of Henry V, King of England who reigned from 1413 to 1422.

The period of tenure as Earl is given after the name and title(s) of each individual, including any period of minority.

Earl of Arundel

- Thomas Fitzalan, 12th Earl of Arundel, 10th Earl of Surrey (1399–1415)
- John Fitzalan, 13th Earl of Arundel (1415–1421)
- John Fitzalan, 14th Earl of Arundel (1421–1435)

Earl of Devon

- Edward de Courtenay, 3rd Earl of Devon (1377–1419)
- Hugh de Courtenay, 4th Earl of Devon (1419–1422)
- Thomas de Courtenay, 5th Earl of Devon (1422–1458)

Earl of Dorset (Second creation)

- Thomas Beaufort, Duke of Exeter, Earl of Dorset (1411–1426)

Earl of Huntingdon (Fourth creation)

- John Holland, 2nd Earl of Huntingdon (1416–1447)

Earl of Kendal

- John of Lancaster, 1st Duke of Bedford, Earl of Richmond, Earl of Kendal (1414–1435)

Earl of March

- Edmund Mortimer, 5th Earl of March (1398–1425)

Earl of Norfolk (Third creation)

- John Mowbray, 2nd Duke of Norfolk, 5th Earl of Norfolk, 3rd Earl of Nottingham (1405–1432)

Earl of Northumberland (Second creation)

- Henry Percy, 2nd Earl of Northumberland (1416–1455)

Earl of Nottingham (Second creation)

- John Mowbray, 2nd Duke of Norfolk, 5th Earl of Norfolk, 3rd Earl of Nottingham (1405–1432)

Earl of Oxford

- Richard de Vere, 11th Earl of Oxford (1400–1417)
- John de Vere, 12th Earl of Oxford (1417–1462)

Earl of Pembroke (Fifth creation)

- Humphrey of Lancaster, 1st Duke of Gloucester, 1st Earl of Pembroke (1414–1447)

Earl of Richmond (Second creation restored)

- Arthur III, Duke of Brittany, Earl of Richmond (1393–1425)

Earl of Richmond (Sixth creation)

- John of Lancaster, 1st Duke of Bedford, Earl of Richmond, Earl of Kendal (1414–1435)

Earl of Salisbury (Second creation)

- Thomas Montagu, 4th Earl of Salisbury (1400–1428)

Earl of Somerset (Second creation)

- Henry Beaufort, 2nd Earl of Somerset (1410–1418)
- John Beaufort, 1st Duke of Somerset, 3rd Earl of Somerset (1418–1444)

Earl of Stafford

- Humphrey Stafford, 1st Duke of Buckingham, 6th Earl of Stafford (1403–1460)

Earl of Suffolk (Third creation)

- Michael de la Pole, 2nd Earl of Suffolk (1398–1399) (1399–1415)
- Michael de la Pole, 3rd Earl of Suffolk (1415)
- William de la Pole, 4th Earl of Suffolk (1415–1450)

Earl of Surrey

- Thomas Fitzalan, 12th Earl of Arundel, 10th Earl of Surrey (1400–1415)

Earl of Tankerville

- John Grey, 1st Earl of Tankerville (1418–1421)
- Henry Grey, 2nd Earl of Tankerville (1421–1450)

Earl of Warwick

- Richard Beauchamp, 13th Earl of Warwick (1401–1439)

Earl of Westmorland

- Ralph Neville, 1st Earl of Westmorland (1397–1425)

== Sources ==
Ellis, Geoffrey. (1963) Earldoms in Fee: A Study in Peerage Law and History. London: The Saint Catherine Press, Limited.
