= Gesta Henrici Quinti =

15th-century English chronicle written in Latin

- Author: anonymous
- Language: English and Latin
- Subject: History
- Publication date: 1417
- Publication place: Kingdom of England

The Gesta Henrici Quinti ("Deeds of Henry the Fifth") is a medieval Latin chronicle written by an anonymous author.

The book was published in 1975 by Frank Taylor and John Roskell Smith. The author of the book is believed to be either Thomas Elmham or Joannes de Bordin, but since the true identity of the author has not yet been confirmed, he is described by most sources as anonymous.

There are currently only two manuscripts of the Gesta Henrici Quinti and both have been preserved at the British Library.

The book chronicles the life of Henry V of England. The books covers the period from Henry's accession in 1413 to 1416. References to Sir John Oldcastle being still alive indicate that it was written before 1418.

== See also ==
- Knighton's Chronicon
