= Battle of the Seine =

1416 naval battle of the Hundred Years' War

- Part of the Hundred Years' War
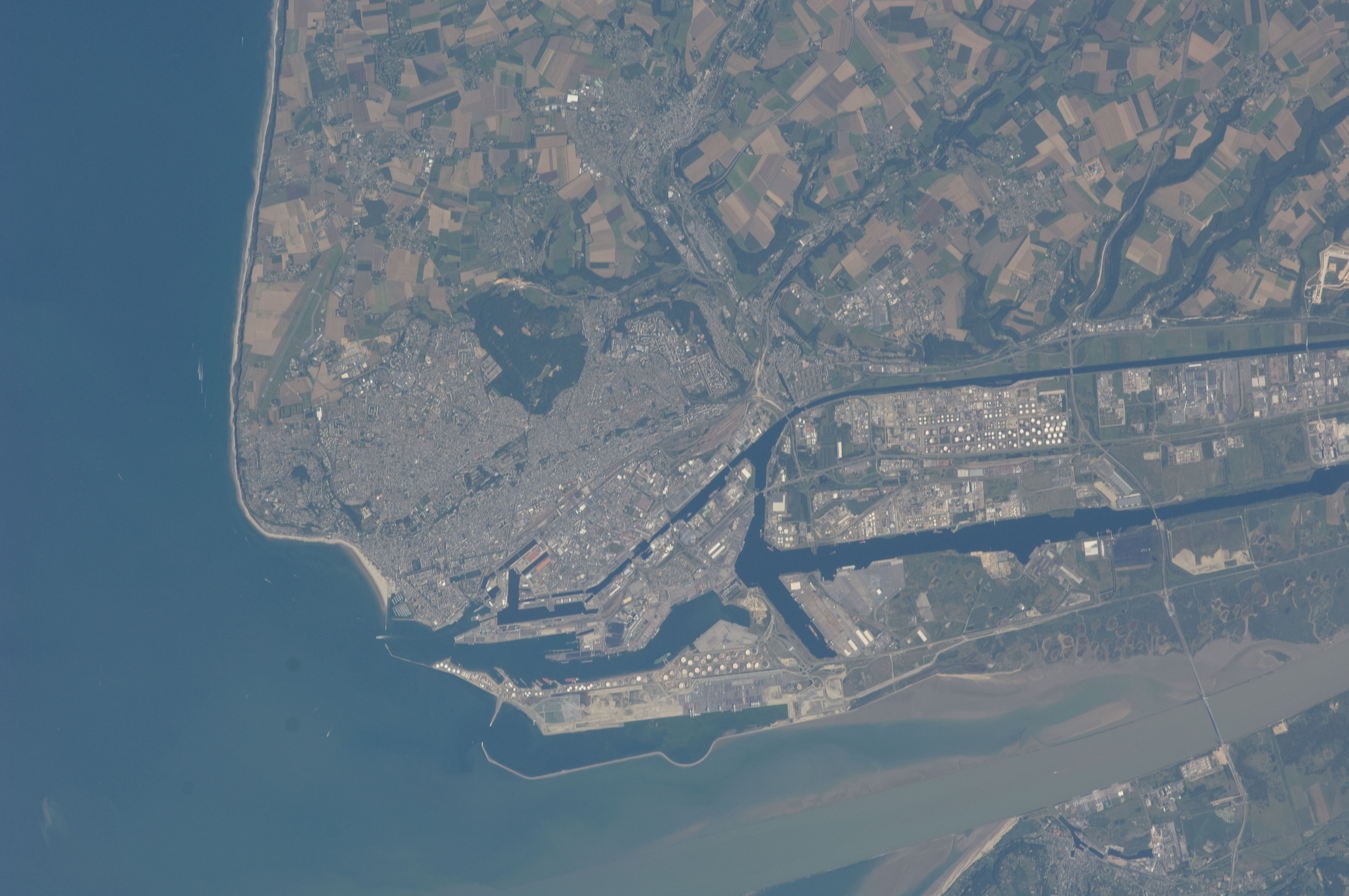
- The docks of modern Le Havre, which are built on reclaimed land in the Seine estuary close to where the battle took place
Date	15 August 1416
Location	Off Harfleur, Kingdom of France 49.444°N 0.196°E
Result	English victory

Belligerents
Kingdom of England	Kingdom of France; Republic of Genoa

Commanders and leaders
John of Lancaster, Duke of Bedford	Unknown

Strength
4 carracks with 7000 soldiers aboard	16 ships (8 galleys, 8 carracks), soldiers including 600 Genoese crossbowmen

Casualties and losses
Unknown	3 carracks captured, 1 wrecked fleeing the battle

The Battle of the Seine was a naval battle which took place between the forces of England and France in the estuary of the River Seine on 15 August 1416, during the Hundred Years War. The battle was a decisive English victory which facilitated Henry V's second invasion of France in 1417.

The main primary source for the battle is Thomas Walsingham.

== Background ==
Henry V had reopened the Hundred Years War by invading Normandy in 1415. He had besieged and taken the port of Harfleur, at the mouth of the River Seine, but had suffered heavy losses in doing so. Although his depleted army nevertheless managed to win a famous victory over a much larger French force at Agincourt, the king was forced to withdraw to England to regroup. An English garrison was left behind to hold Harfleur. Over the winter the English raided the surrounding countryside and fought an indecisive skirmish against the French at Valmont.

== The 1416 Campaign ==
In the summer of 1416 the French attempted to force the garrison of Harfleur to capitulate by mounting a naval blockade to interdict supplies from England. For this purpose a large French naval force was assembled at Honfleur, the port facing Harfleur across the Seine estuary. Genoese carracks and crossbowmen were hired to reinforce the French. Besides blockading Harfleur, the French ships also ventured across the English Channel to raid the Isle of Wight and menace Portsmouth.

An English fleet was assembled at Southampton to confront the French under the command of John of Lancaster, Duke of Bedford, the king's younger brother. In August 1416 he sallied across the Channel and engaged the French fleet off Harfleur. The English inflicted a heavy defeat on the French, capturing three carracks; a fourth was wrecked while trying to escape.

== Aftermath ==
In the short term, the destruction of the French blockading force frustrated any hope of forcing the capitulation of the English garrison in Harfleur, which in turn ensured that Henry V would have a secure base in Normandy from which to mount his second invasion of the duchy in 1417. This campaign was rapidly successful, resulting in the capture of Caen and Rouen, the conquest of Normandy and ultimately the Treaty of Troyes. In the long run, it ensured that England would enjoy naval supremacy in the English Channel for decades to come.
