= Édouard Perroy =

French medieval historian

- Born: 2 August 1901; Grenoble, France
- Died: 26 July 1974 (aged 72)
- Occupations: Medieval historian, academic
- Known for: Member of the French Resistance

Édouard Perroy (2 August 1901 – 26 July 1974) was a French medieval historian and member of the French Resistance.

== Life ==
Born in Grenoble, Perroy passed his agrégation in 1924, and was a lecturer at the University of Glasgow from 1924 to 1934. He defended his thesis on the religious policy of Richard II in 1934. The following year, he was appointed maître de conférences at Lille University, where he became a professor, before moving to the Sorbonne as a professor in 1949, retiring in 1971.

During the Second World War, Perroy was a member of the French Resistance. Under the pseudonym "Besson", he was responsible for the Mouvements unis de la Résistance's propaganda in the Loire region. In April 1944, he was appointed to the organisation's executive board. In 1945, he was chosen to announce the liberation of Saint-Étienne to the city. For his wartime activities, he received the Médaille de la Résistance. After the liberation of France, he was appointed to the commission charged with compiling the history of the Resistance.

Perroy was a specialist on the late Middle Ages in England. He had a particular interest in Anglo-French relations during that period, and wrote extensively on that subject as well as on the Hundred Years' War and on the English occupation of France.

Perroy was elected a corresponding fellow of the British Academy in 1958. A festschrift featuring sixty-four contributors, Économies et Sociétés au Moyen-Âge. Mélanges offerts à Édouard Perroy, was published in his honour in 1973.
