= Waqf (disambiguation) =

Waqf (Arabic: وَقْف; [ˈwɑqf]), also known as hubous (حُبوس) or mortmain property is an inalienable charitable endowment under Islamic law.

Waqf or the plural Awqaf (Arabic: أوقاف) can also refer to:

== Waqf ==
- Al Waqf, Egypt, city
- Al-Waqf, Syria, village
- Al-Waqf, Yemen, village
- WAQF Tower, a skyscraper in Niamey, Niger

== Awqaf ==
- AWQAF Africa, waqf serving all countries of Africa
- Al-Awqaf Library, an Iraqi library located near the Iraq National Library and Archive
- Ministry of Awqaf (Egypt)
- Auqaf Board, West Bengal, India

== See also ==
- Waqf-e-Jadid (also known as The New Dedication), a scheme initiated in 1957, launched to spread Islam and Ahmadiyyat in remote areas of Pakistan, especially in the province of Sindh
- Central Waqf Council, a body corporate in India
- Jerusalem Waqf, a body corporate in Jerusalem
