= Castle Farmhouse =

Castle Farmhouse may refer to:

- Castle Farmhouse, Raglan, Wales
- Castle Farmhouse, St Georges-super-Ely, Wales
- Northborough Manor House
