= List of destroyed libraries =

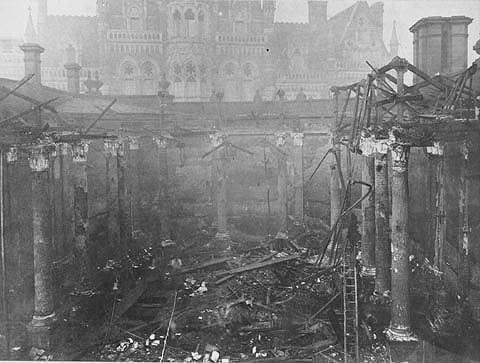
Birmingham Central Library destroyed by fire, 1879

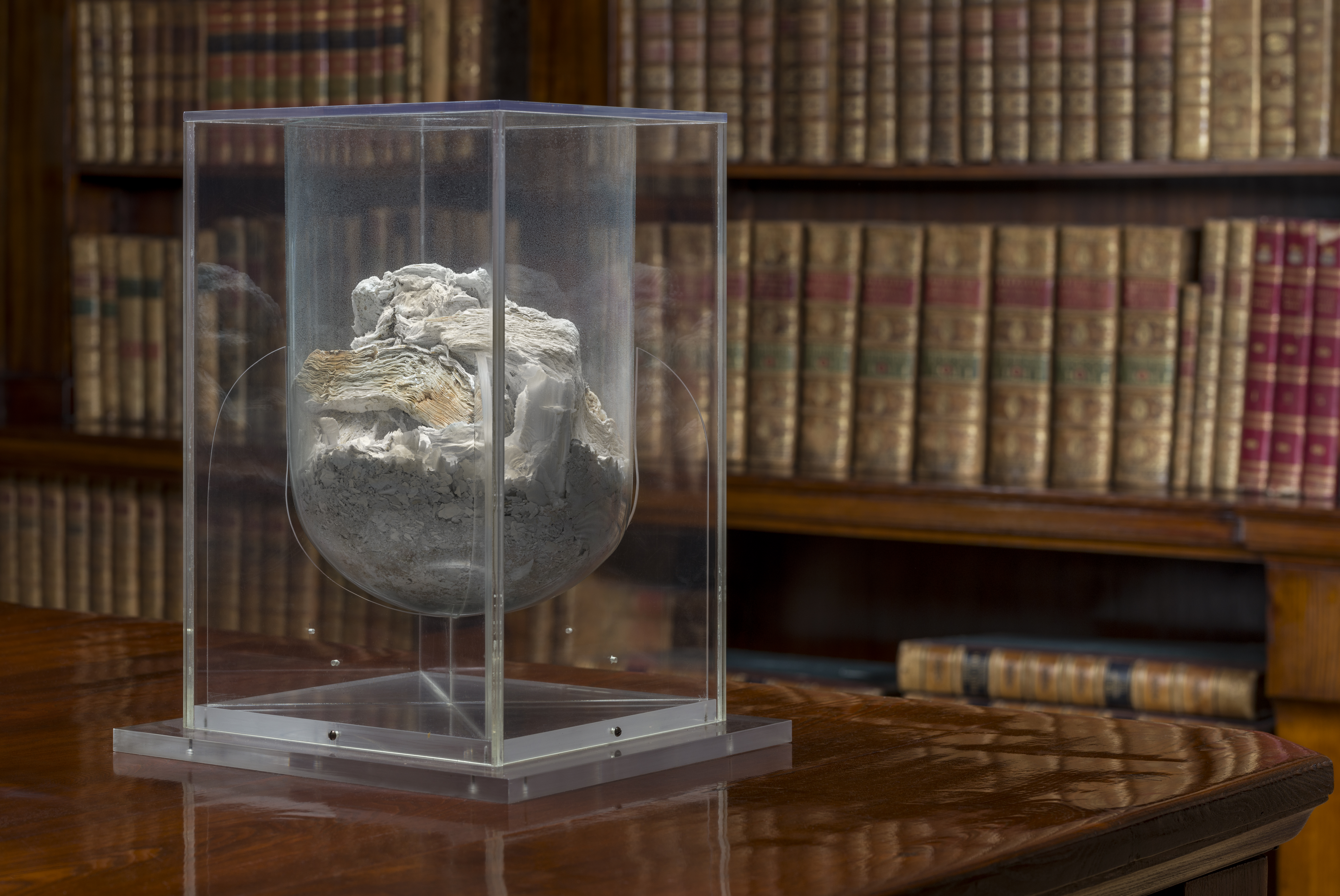
The urn containing ashes of the most precious Polish incunabula and manuscripts, deliberately burnt in the Krasiński Library by a Nazi German Brandkommando following the fall of the Warsaw Uprising

Libraries have been deliberately or accidentally destroyed or badly damaged. Sometimes a library is purposely destroyed as a form of culturicide.

There are examples of libraries accidentally destroyed by human actions. Others were damaged by natural disasters like earthquakes, floods or accidental fires.

Library fires have happened sporadically through the centuries: notable examples are the destruction of the Library of Alexandria, the destruction of Library of Nalanda in India and the accidental burning of the Duchess Anna Amalia Library in Weimar, Germany.

== Causes and prevention ==
In earlier times mildew was considered a major problem in many libraries, and so the emphasis on library design was to increase air flow by, for example, leaving openings under the shelves in adjoining floors. In a fire, particularly one that starts on any floor except the top level, the flames would be drawn from floor to floor by the air flow, leading quite easily to the destruction of a whole library rather than just a small part.

Advances in technology have reduced the possibility of a library collection being destroyed by fire. These include water sprinklers, fire doors, freezers, alarms, smoke detectors, suppression systems, and emergency generators. Older libraries are usually altered by closing up air flow openings and installing fire doors, alarms and sprinklers. Air conditioning reduces the mold problems. These are all essential parts of new library design.

There is no recovery possible if a book is burnt, so it is accepted that it is better to put out the fire with water and then dry out the books. As mold destroys paper, the books are frozen until they can be dried. This process will damage the book but not destroy it, and the information will be intact.

To reduce the chance of damage from fire, or other causes, and decrease the time needed for recovery after a destructive event, libraries need a disaster management and recovery plan. This can be an ongoing process which will include professional development following updates in technology for key staff, training for the remaining staff, checking and maintaining disaster kits, and review of the disaster plan.

In addition, fire-safety investigations are periodically carried out, especially for historical libraries. The Library of Congress, for example, underwent a year-long inspection beginning in 2000. Before the Congressional Accountability Act of 1995, the Library of Congress and all Capitol Hill buildings were exempt from safety regulations. Balancing historical preservation and contemporary safety standards proves to be a difficult task for "even a 12-year rehabilitation of LC completed in 1997 did not address many fire hazards". After the Compliance Office inspection, however, the LC announced their wholehearted commitment "to achieving the highest level of safety possible" and "the Architect of the Capitol and Library of Congress will report their progress to the Office of Compliance every three months".

Information technology is another reason for careful fire protection. With so many computers in libraries there "is a decrease in floor space and an increase in more compact and powerful computer systems" which generate more heat and require the use of many more outlets, increasing the number of potential ignition sources. From as early as the 1950s the potential dangers of computer equipment, and the facilities that house them, were recognized. Thus, in 1962 the National Fire Protection Association began developing the first safety standards specifically applicable to electronic computer systems. This standard is called NFPA 75 Protection of Information Technology Equipment. FM Global Data Sheet 5–32 is another standard providing guidelines to protect against not only fire, but also water, power loss, etc.

== Human action ==
Image	Name of the library	City	Country	Date of destruction	Perpetrator	Reason and/or account of destruction
	Library of Zimri-Lim	Mari	Ancient Mesopotamia	1761 BC	Hammurabi of the Old Babylonian Empire	The kingdom was invaded by Hammurabi who defeated Zimri-Lim in battle in c. 1761 BC and ended the Lim dynasty. Mari survived the destruction and rebelled against Babylon in c. 1759 BC, causing Hammurabi to destroy the whole city.
	Library of Ashurbanipal	Nineveh	Neo-Assyrian Empire	612 BC	coalition of Babylonians, Scythians and Medes	Nineveh was destroyed in 612 BCE by a coalition of Babylonians, Scythians and Medes, an ancient Iranian people. It is believed that during the burning of the palace, a great fire must have ravaged the library, causing the clay cuneiform tablets to become partially baked. This potentially destructive event helped preserve the tablets. As well as texts on clay tablets, some of the texts may have been inscribed onto wax boards which, because of their organic nature, have been lost.
	Xianyang Palace and State Archives	Xianyang	Qin China	206 BC	Xiang Yu	Xiang Yu, rebelling against emperor Qin Er Shi, led his troops into Xianyang in 206 BC. He ordered the destruction of the Xianyang Palace by fire.
	Library of Alexandria	Alexandria	Hellenistic Egypt; Roman Egypt	Disputed	Disputed	Disputed, see destruction of the Library of Alexandria.
	Imperial library of Luoyang	Luoyang	Han China	189 AD	Dong Zhuo	Much of the city, including the imperial library, was purposefully burned when its population was relocated during an evacuation.
	Library of Pantainos	Athens	Roman Greece	267	Heruli	It was destroyed in 267 AD during the Heroulian invasion and in the 5th century it was incorporated into a large peristyle building.
	Hadrian's Library	Athens	Roman Greece	267	Heruli	The library was seriously damaged by the Herulian invasion of 267 and repaired by the prefect Herculius in AD 407–412.
	Library of Antioch	Antioch	Roman Syria	364	Emperor Jovian	The library had been heavily stocked by the aid of the perpetrator's non-Christian predecessor, Emperor Julian (the Apostate).
	Library of the Serapeum	Alexandria	Hellenistic Egypt; Roman Egypt	392	Theophilus of Alexandria	Following the conversion of the temple of Serapis into a church, the library was destroyed.
	Theological Library of Caesarea Maritima	Caesarea Maritima	Ancient Palestine	639	Capture of the city by the Saracens	"The building had been destroyed in the Islamic conquest of Caesarea in 639/640 A.D."
	Library of al-Hakam II	Córdoba	Al-Andalus	976	Al-Mansur Ibn Abi Aamir & religious scholars	All books consisting of "ancient science" were destroyed in a surge of ultra-orthodoxy.
	Library of Rayy	Rayy	Buyid Emirate	1029	Sultan Mahmud of Ghazni	Burned the library and all books deemed as heretical.
	House of Learning	Baghdad	Abbasid Empire	c. 1055-1056	Seljuk Turks	The House of Learning, built by Sabur ibn Ardashir, was burned during the Seljuk occupation of Baghdad in 1055-1056.
	Library at Sázava Monastery	Sázava	Holy Roman Empire	c. 1097	Abbot Diethard	After the removal of the Slavonic Benedictines from Sázava monastery, the new abbot destroyed all books written in Old Church Slavonic.
	Library of Banu Ammar (Dar al-'ilm)	Tripoli	Fatimid Caliphate	1109	Crusaders	Following Sharaf ad-Dawla ibn Abi al-Tayyib's surrender to Baldwin I of Jerusalem, Genoese mercenaries burned and looted part of the city. The library, Dar al-'ilm, was burned.
	Library of Ghazna	Ghazna	Ghurid empire	1151	'Ala al-Din Husayn	City was sacked and burned for seven days. Libraries and palaces built by the Ghaznavids were destroyed.
	Library of Nishapur	Nishapur	Seljuk Empire	1154	Oghuz Turks	City partially destroyed, libraries sacked and burned.
	Library of the Church of Jacob Mar	Nisibis	Zengid state	1171	Nur al-Din Zengi	The church and the contents of the library of 1,000 volumes were looted and destroyed.
	Nalanda	Nalanda	India	1193	Bakhtiyar Khilji	Nalanda University complex (the most renowned repository of Buddhist knowledge in the world at the time) was sacked by Turkic Muslim invaders under the perpetrator; this event is seen as a milestone in the decline of Buddhism in India.
	Libraries of Constantinople	Constantinople	Byzantine Empire	1204	Crusaders of the Fourth Crusade	Upon Emperor Michael VIII's recapture of Constantinople, the realization that the sack in 1204 by the Crusaders had destroyed the religious and secular buildings(including libraries). Most of the treasured items being destroyed or sent to the West.
	Imperial Library of Constantinople	Constantinople	Byzantine Empire	Disputed	Disputed	Disputed, see Imperial Library of Constantinople#The destruction of the library.
	Alamut Castle's library	Alamut Castle	Iran	1256	Mongols	Library destroyed after the capitulation of Alamut.
	House of Wisdom	Baghdad	Iraq	1258	Mongols	Destroyed during the Battle of Baghdad
	Libraries of Constantinople	Constantinople	Byzantine Empire	1453	Ottoman Turks	After the Fall of Constantinople, hundreds upon thousands of manuscripts were removed, sold, or destroyed from Constantinople's libraries.
	Madrassah Library	Granada	Crown of Castile	1499	Cardinal Cisneros	The library was ransacked by troops of Cardinal Cisneros in late 1499, the books were taken to the Plaza Bib-Rambla, where most of them were burned.
	Bibliotheca Corviniana	Buda	Hungary	1526	Ottoman Turks	Library was destroyed by Ottomans in the Battle of Mohács.
	Monastic libraries	England	England	1530s	Royal officials	The monastic libraries were destroyed or dispersed following the dissolution of monasteries by Henry VIII.
	Glasney College	Penryn, Cornwall	England	1548	Royal officials	The smashing and looting of the Cornish colleges at Glasney and Crantock brought an end to the formal scholarship which had helped to sustain the Cornish language and the Cornish cultural identity.
	Records on Gozo	Gozo	Hospitaller Malta	1551	Ottoman Turks	Most paper records held on Gozo were lost or destroyed during an Ottoman raid in 1551. The raid is said to have "led to the near total destruction of documentary evidence for life in medieval Gozo."
	Maya codices of the Yucatán	Maní, Yucatán	Mexico and Guatemala	1562-07-12	Diego de Landa	Bishop De Landa, a Franciscan friar and conquistador during the Spanish conquest of Yucatán, wrote: "We found a large number of books in these characters and, as they contained nothing in which were not to be seen as superstition and lies of the devil, we burned them all, which they (the Maya) regretted to an amazing degree, and which caused them much affliction." Only three extant codices are widely considered unquestionably authentic.
	Raglan Library	Raglan Castle	Wales	1646	Parliamentary Army	The Earl of Worcester's library was burnt during the English Civil War by forces under the command of Thomas Fairfax
	Załuski Library	Warsaw	Polish-Lithuanian Commonwealth/German-occupied Poland (General Government)	1794/1944	Imperial Russian Army/Nazi German troops	After the Kościuszko Uprising (1794), Russian troops, acting on orders from Czarina Catherine II, seized the library's holdings and transported them to her personal collection at Saint Petersburg, where a year later it formed the cornerstone of the newly founded Imperial Public Library. Parts of the collections were damaged or destroyed as they were mishandled while being removed from the library and transported to Russia, and many were stolen. According to the historian Joachim Lelewel, the Zaluskis' books, "could be bought at Grodno by the basket". The collection was later dispersed among several Russian libraries. Some parts of the Zaluski collection came back to Poland on two separate dates in the nineteenth century: 1842 and 1863. Government of the re-established Second Polish Republic reclaimed in the 1920s some of the former Załuski Library holdings from the Russian Soviet Federative Socialist Republic following the Treaty of Riga. The original building was destroyed by the Germans during World War II. German soldiers also deliberately destroyed the collection (held in the Krasiński Library at the time - see below) during the planned destruction of Warsaw in October 1944, after collapse of the Warsaw Uprising. Only 1800 manuscripts and 30,000 printed materials from the original library survived the war. After the war, the original building was rebuilt under the Polish People's Republic.
	Library of Congress	Washington, D.C.	United States	1814	Troops of the British Army	The library was destroyed during the War of 1812 when British forces set fire to the U.S. Capitol during the Burning of Washington. This attack was retaliation for the burning of the Canadian towns of York and Niagara by American troops in 1813. Soon after its destruction, the Library of Congress was reestablished, largely thanks to the purchase of Thomas Jefferson's personal library in 1815. A second fire on December 24, 1851, destroyed a large portion of the Library of Congress' collection again, however, resulting in the loss of about two-thirds of the Thomas Jefferson collection and an estimated 35,000 books in total.
	Several libraries	Mexico City and major Mexican cities	Mexico	1856–1867	Liberal troops and anti-clericalists	During and after the Mexican Reform War, under the liberal governments of Benito Juárez and Ignacio Comonfort, many convent libraries and Church owned school libraries were sacked or destroyed by Liberal troops and looters, most notably included San Francisco Convent Library, which had over 16,000 books (great majority of them were unique collections of Spanish colonial era productions), the library was totally destroyed. Other important libraries included San Agustín Convent Library, was looted and burned. The Carmen de San Ángel Convent and its library were also totally destroyed (with a few books recovered), other affected convent libraries to different degrees were those of Santo Domingo, Las Capuchinas, Santa Clara, La Merced and the Church owned school Colegio de San Juan de Letrán, among others, all of them in Mexico City. Similar events happened all over Mexico, especially in major cities. Besides books, other items such as altarpieces, unique collections of colonial period Baroque paintings, crosses, sculptures, gold and silver chalices (often robbed and melted) were also lost. Total estimates place the total of lost books and manuscripts at 100,000 by 1884.
	University of Alabama	Tuscaloosa, Alabama	United States	1865-05-04	Troops of the Union Army	During the American Civil War, Union troops destroyed most buildings on the University of Alabama campus, including its library of approximately 7,000 volumes.
	Mosque-Library	Turnovo, Bulgaria	Ottoman Empire	1877	Christian Bulgarians	Turkish books in a library were destroyed when the mosque was burned.
	Royal library of the Kings of Burma	Mandalay Palace	Burma	1885–1887	Troops of the British Army	The British looted the palace at the end of the 3rd Anglo-Burmese War (some of the artefacts which were taken away are still on display in the Victoria and Albert Museum in London) and burned down the royal library.
	Hanlin Academy Library	Hanlin Academy	China	1900-06-23/4	Disputed. Possibly the Kansu Braves besieging the west of the Legation Quarter, or possibly by the international defending forces.	During the Siege of the International Legations in Beijing at the height of the Boxer Rebellion, the unofficial national library of China at the Hanlin Academy, which was adjacent to the British Legation, was set on fire (by whom and whether deliberately or accidentally is still disputed) and almost entirely destroyed. Many of the books and scrolls that survived the flames were subsequently looted by forces of the victorious foreign powers.
	Library of the Catholic University of Leuven	Leuven	Belgium	1914-08-25/1940-05	German Occupation Troops	The Germans set the library on fire as part of the burning of the entire city in an attempt to use terror to quell Belgian resistance to occupation. The library caught again fire during the World War II German invasion of Louvain, Belgium.
	Public Records Office of Ireland	Dublin	Ireland	1922	Disputed. Poss. deliberately by Anti-Treaty IRA or accidental ignition of their stored explosives due to shelling by Provisional Government forces.	The Four Courts was occupied by the Anti-Treaty IRA at the start of the Irish Civil War. The building was bombarded by the Provisional Government forces under Michael Collins.
	Several religious libraries	Madrid	Republican Spain	1931	Anarchists and anti-clericalists	In 1931, several groups of radical leftists and anarchists, with the complicit inaction of the Republican government, burned down several convents in Madrid. Most included important libraries. Among them, the Colegio de la Inmaculada y San Pedro Claver and the Instituto Católico de Artes e Industrias with a library of 20 000 volumes; the Casa Profesa with a library of 80 000 volumes, considered the second best in Spain at the time, after the National Library; and the Instituto Católico de Artes e Industrias, with 20 000 volumes, including the archives of the paleographer García Villada, and 100 000 popular songs compiled by P. Antonio Martínez. Everything was lost.
	Oriental Library (also known as Dongfang Tushuguan)	Zhabei, Shanghai	China	1932-02-01	Imperial Japanese Army	During the January 28 incident in the Second Sino-Japanese War Japanese forces bombed The Commercial Press and the attached Oriental Library, setting it alight and destroying most of its collection of more than 500,000 volumes.
	Institut für Sexualwissenschaft	Berlin	Nazi Germany	1933-05-??	Members of the Deutsche Studentenschaft	On 6 May 1933, the Deutsche Studentenschaft made an organised attack on the Institute of Sex Research. A few days later, the institute's library and archives were publicly hauled out and burned in the streets of the Opernplatz.
	University of Oviedo	Oviedo	Second Spanish Republic	1934-10-13	Revolutionaries or bombs thrown by government airplanes	During the Asturian miners' strike of 1934, armed revolutionaries took Oviedo and were repressed by the Spanish Army on orders by General Francisco Franco.
	National University of Tsing Hua, University Nan-k'ai, Institute of Technology of He-pei, Medical College of He-pei, Agricultural College of He-pei, University Ta Hsia, University Kuang Hua, National University of Hunan		China	1937–1945	World War II Japanese Troops	During World War II, Japanese military forces destroyed or partly destroyed numerous Chinese libraries, including libraries at the National University of Tsing Hua, Peking (lost 200,000 of 350,000 books), the University Nan-k'ai, T'ien-chin (totally destroyed, 224,000 books lost), Institute of Technology of He-pei, T'ien-chin (completely destroyed), Medical College of He-pei, Pao-ting (completely destroyed), Agricultural College of He-pei, Pao-ting (completely destroyed), University Ta Hsia, Shanghai (completely destroyed), University Kuang Hua, Shanghai (completely destroyed), National University of Hunan (completely destroyed).
	National Library of Serbia	Belgrade	Yugoslavia	1941-04-06	Nazi German Luftwaffe	Destroyed during the World War II bombing of Belgrade, on the order of Adolf Hitler himself. Around 500.000 volumes and all collections of the library were destroyed in one of the largest book bonfires in European history.
	SS. Cyril and Methodius National Library	Sofia	Bulgaria	1943–1944	Allied bombing Allied air forces	
	Krasiński Library (housing special collections of the National Library of Poland, including the Załuski Library collection, as well as those of the Warsaw University Library and the Warsaw Public Library)	Warsaw	German-occupied Poland (General Government)	1944	Nazi German troops	The library was deliberately set ablaze by Nazi German troops in the aftermath of the suppression of the Warsaw Uprising of 1944. The burning of this library was part of the general planned destruction of Warsaw.
	Library of the Zamoyski Family Entail	Warsaw	German-occupied Poland (General Government)	1944	Nazi German troops	The library (which housed the collections of the former Zamoyski Academy) was deliberately set ablaze by the Nazi German troops in the aftermath of the suppression of the Warsaw Uprising of 1944. The burning of this library was part of the general planned destruction of Warsaw. Depending on source, 1800 to 3000 items constituting only 1.5% to 3% of the original collection (albeit the most valuable part) survived, partially due to the fact that the troops burning the library did not notice the entrance to the basement at the rear side of the building.
	Central Archives of Historical Records	Warsaw	German-occupied Poland (General Government)	1944	Nazi German troops	In the aftermath of the suppression of the Warsaw Uprising of 1944, the archives (one of the pair of archives housing historical documents of the Polish-Lithuanian Commonwealth, with the other located in Vilnius) were not only deliberately set ablaze, but the Nazi German troops also entered each of the nine accessible fire-proof vaults in the underground shelter and meticulously burned one after another (entrance to the 10th was blocked by rubble, thus saving its contents). Part of the general planned destruction of Warsaw.
	Multiple private libraries all over Tokyo.	Tokyo	Empire of Japan	1945	US army air force	US firebombing of Tokyo in May 1945 destroyed many private Japanese libraries such as the 40,000 volumes in Hasegawa Nyozekan's house. The firebombing of Tokyo destroyed the majority of personal libraries there with many publications from before the war being permanently lost. Firebombing damaged Keio university in Tokyo.
	Warsaw Public Library	Warsaw	German-occupied Poland (General Government)	1945	Nazi German troops	Before the outbreak of World War II the library already contained 500,000 book volumes. In January 1945 it was set ablaze by retreating Nazi German soldiers. As a result, 300,000 books were destroyed, another 100,000 were looted.
	Raczyński Library	Poznań	German-occupied Poland (Reichsgau Wartheland)	1945	Nazi German troops	The retreating Nazi German troops planted explosives in the building and triggered detonation, demolishing the entire structure and burning 90% of the collection, while the remaining 10% were looted in advance.
	Lebanese National Library	Beirut	Lebanon	1975	Lebanese Civil War	The 1975 war fighting began in Beirut's downtown where the National Library was located. During the war years, the library suffered significant damage. According to some sources, 1200 of most precious manuscripts disappeared, and no memory is left of the Library's organization and operational procedures of that time.
	National Library of Cambodia	Phnom Penh	Cambodia	1976–1979	The Khmer Rouge	Burnt most of the books and all bibliographical records. Only 20% of materials survived.
	Jaffna Public Library	Jaffna	Sri Lanka	1981-05-??	Plainclothes police officers and others	In May 1981, a mob composed of thugs and plainclothes police officers went on a rampage in minority Tamil-dominated northern Jaffna, and burned down the Jaffna Public Library. At least 95,000 volumes – the second largest library collection in South Asia – were destroyed.
	Sikh Reference Library	Punjab	India	1984-06-07	Indian Army	Prior to its destruction by Indian troops, the library hosted a vast collection of an estimated 20,000 literary works, including 11,107 books, 2,500 manuscripts, newspaper archives, historical letters, documents/files, and others mostly on Sikhism and in the Punjabi language but also on other topics and in other languages. Its destruction could have been a desperate act on failure to locate letters or documents that could have implicated the then Indian government and its leader Indira Gandhi.
!	Central University Library of Bucharest	Bucharest	Romania	1989-12-2?	Romanian Land Forces	Burnt down during the Romanian Revolution.
	Oriental Institute in Sarajevo	Sarajevo	Bosnia and Herzegovina	1992-05-17	Bosnian Serb Army	Destroyed by the shellfire during the Siege of Sarajevo.
	National and University Library of Bosnia and Herzegovina	Sarajevo	Bosnia and Herzegovina	1992-08-25	Bosnian Serb Army	The library was completely destroyed during the Siege of Sarajevo.
	Abkhazian Research Institute of History, Language and Literature & National Library of Abkhazia	Sukhumi	Abkhazia	1992-10-??	Georgian Armed Forces	Destroyed during the War in Abkhazia.
	City library	Linköping	Sweden	1996-09-20	Lack of evidence for trial	After a year of repeated, minor arson attempts against an information bureau for immigrants located in the building, the library is eventually burnt down to the ground.
	Pol-i-Khomri Public Library	Pol-i-Khomri	Afghanistan	1998	Taliban militia	It held 55,000 books and old manuscripts.
	Iraq National Library and Archive, Al-Awqaf Library, Central Library of the University of Baghdad, Library of Bayt al-Hikma, Central Library of the University of Mosul and other libraries	Baghdad	Iraq	2003-04-??	Unknown members of the Bagdad population	Several libraries looted, set on fire, damaged and destroyed in various degrees during the 2003 Iraq War.
	The People's Library Occupy Wall Street	Zuccotti Park Lower Manhattan New York City	United States	2011	New York City Department of Sanitation	Over 5,000 books cataloged in LibraryThing were seized.
	Egyptian Scientific Institute	Cairo	Egypt	2011-12-??	Aftermath of street clashes during the Egyptian revolution	A first estimate says that only 30,000 volumes have been saved of a total of 200,000.
	Ahmed Baba Institute (Timbuktu library)	Timbuktu	Mali	2013-01-28	Islamist militias	Before the library was burned down, it contained over 20,000 manuscripts with only a fraction of them having been scanned as of January 2013. Before and during the occupation, more than 300,000 Timbuktu Manuscripts from the Institute and from private libraries were saved and moved to more secure locations.
	Ratanda Public Library	Lesedi Local Municipality	South Africa	2013-03-12	Public riots	1,807 library books, technological infrastructure including seven patron workstations, a photocopy machine and a large screen television.
	Libraries of Fisheries and Oceans Canada		Canada	2013	Government of Canada headed by prime minister Stephen Harper	Digitization effort to reduce the nine original libraries to seven and save $C443,000 annual cost. Only 5–6% of the material was digitized, and scientific records and research created at a taxpayer cost of tens of millions of dollars were dumped, burned, and given away. Particularly noted are baseline data important to ecological research, and data from 19th century exploration.
	Saeh Library	Tripoli	Lebanon	2014-01-03	Unknown	The Christian library was burned down, it contained over 80,000 manuscripts and books.
	National Archives of Bosnia and Herzegovina (partially)	Sarajevo	Bosnia and Herzegovina	2014-02-07	Seven Bosnian rioters suspected of having started the fire; two (Salem Hatibović and Nihad Trnka) were arrested. On 4 April 2014, Salem Hatibović and Nihad Trnka were released (although still under suspicion of terrorism), on conditions that they don't leave their places of residence and abstain from having any contact with each other. Both were also mandated to report to the police once every week.	During the 2014 unrest in Bosnia and Herzegovina large amounts of historical documents were destroyed when sections of the Archives of Bosnia and Herzegovina, housed in the presidential building, were set on fire. Among the lost archival material were documents and gifts from the Ottoman period, original documents from the 1878–1918 Austro-Hungarian rule in Bosnia and Herzegovina, as well as documentations of the interwar period, the 1941–1945 rule of the Independent State of Croatia, papers from the following years, and about 15,000 files from the 1996–2003 Human Rights Chamber for Bosnia and Herzegovina. In the repositories that were burnt, about 60 percent of the material was lost, according to estimates by Šaban Zahirović, the head of the Archives.
	Mosul University libraries and private libraries	Mosul	Iraq	2014-12-??	Ongoing ISIL book burning	Book burning.
	Libraries in Al Anbar Governorate	Al Anbar Governorate	Iraq	2014-12-??	Ongoing ISIL book burning	Book burning.
	Institute of Scientific Information on Social Sciences (INION) (partially?)	Moscow	Russia	2015-01-29	Unknown.	Fire spread to 2000 m^{2} in third Floor. The roof caved in. Additional water damage. Ambient temperature too high for self-freezing of damaged works. The library contains 14 million books, including rare texts in ancient Slavic languages, documents from the League of Nations, UNESCO, and parliamentary reports from countries including the US dating back as far as 1789.
	Mosul public library (Central Public Library in Ninawa)	Mosul	Iraq	2015-02-??	ISIL book burning	8,000 rare old books and manuscripts. Manuscripts from the 18th century, Syriac books printed in Iraq's first printing house in the 19th century, books from the Ottoman era, Iraqi newspapers from the early 20th century.
	Howard College Law Library, University of KwaZulu-Natal	Durban	South Africa	2016-09-06	FeesMustFall protestors	Law Library, including early Roman-Dutch law texts, burnt by protesters during confrontations with the police.
	Azizia Madrasa Library	Bihar Sharif	India	2023-03-31	Ram Navami rioters	The library contained around 4,500 works that were all lost when it was set on-fire in an Islamophobic attack.
	Diana Tamari Sabbagh Library, Rashad Shawa Cultural Center	Gaza City	Palestine	2023-11-25	Israeli military	An airstrike hit the library and the centre that housed it, resulting in the destruction of hundreds of thousands of books. The airstrike took place during the Gaza war.
	Edward Said Public Library	Beit Lahia	Palestine	2023 or 2024	Israeli military	The library was destroyed during the Gaza war
	New College of Florida Gender And Diversity Studies Library	Sarasota	United States	2024	Ron Desantis, Christopher Rufo	The contents of the library were stolen and thrown in the dump while students were largely away on break. At least one dump truck full of books on queer theory, history, Jewish studies.

== Natural disasters ==
Image	Name of the library	City	Country	Date of destruction	Causes and/or account of destruction
	Royal Library of Portugal, Ribeira Palace	Lisbon	Portugal	1755-11-01	Great Lisbon earthquake
	University of Tokyo Library, which included the Max Müller Library, the Nishimura Library, and the Hoshino Library	Tokyo	Japan	1923-09-01	An earthquake and the following fires. In September 1923, the University of Tokyo Library lost 700,000 volumes to the Great Kanto earthquake setting off fires.
	National Library of Nicaragua Rubén Darío		Nicaragua	1931, 1972	It was damaged in the 1931 earthquake. Another earthquake in 1972 caused damage.
	Several libraries, archives, and museums		Indonesia, Malaysia, Maldives, Thailand, Sri Lanka	2004-12-26	The 2004 Indian Ocean earthquake. See Library damage resulting from the 2004 Indian Ocean earthquake.

== Fire ==
Image	Name of the library	City	Country	Date of destruction	Account of destruction
	Library of Celsus	Ephesus	Roman Empire	262	A fire caused by the 262 Southwest Anatolia earthquake or a Gothic invasion.
	Swedish National Library and Royal Archives at Tre Kronor castle	Stockholm	Sweden	1697-05-07	The castle's keeper discovered the fire, the fire marshall was unable to reach fire extinguishing equipment due to it being blocked by fire. The fire quickly spread throughout the castle. Since the castle was made out of wood and copper, the hot copper plates set the roof on fire. Most of Sweden's national library and royal archives were destroyed when the castle burned down in 1697, making the country's early history difficult to document.
	University of Copenhagen Library	Copenhagen	Denmark	October 1728	Copenhagen Fire of 1728
	Cotton Library	London, Ashburnham House	United Kingdom	1731-10-23	
	Library of Congress	Washington, D.C.	United States	1814-08-25	
	Birmingham Central Library	Birmingham	United Kingdom	1879-01-11	A fire broke out behind a wooden partition serving as a temporary wall during building operations. The fire caused extensive damage, with only 1,000 volumes saved from a stock of 50,000.
	University of Virginia Library	Charlottesville, Virginia	United States	1895-10-27	
	New York State Library	Albany, New York	United States	1911-03-29	
	National Library of Peru	Lima	Peru	1943-05-10	
	Jewish Theological Seminary of America library	New York City	United States	1966-04-18	Jewish Theological Seminary library fire
	Charles A. Halbert Public Library	Basseterre	Saint Kitts and Nevis	1982	
	St Michael's House	Crafers	Australia	1983	St Michael's House was destroyed as a result of the Ash Wednesday bushfires. The entire 40,000 volume library was lost including works from the 16th century.
	Dalhousie University Law Library	Halifax, Nova Scotia	Canada	1985-08-16	A lightning strike caused a short circuit in the electrical system which started a fire that destroyed the top floor of the building which housed the library. Most of the 90,000 volumes were saved by first freezing and then drying out the books.
	Los Angeles Central Library	Los Angeles, California	United States	1986-04-29 & 1986-09-03	At 10:52 a.m. on April 29, 1986, a fire alarm alerted staff and patrons of a fire in the library's main building. Over 350 firefighters responded to the blaze, which burned for about 7 hours. An estimated 400,000 books were destroyed and an additional 350,000 materials suffered significant amounts of smoke and water damaged. The fire was determined to have begun on the fifth tier of the northeast stack.
	Academy of Sciences Library	Leningrad	USSR	1988-02-14	The 1988 fire in the Library of the USSR Academy of Sciences (now Library of the Russian Academy of Sciences) broke out on Sunday, February 14, 1988, in the newspaper section on the third floor of the library. According to the library's acting director Valeriy Leonov, the fire alarm sounded at 8:13 pm, when the library was closed for visitors. By the time the fire was extinguished the following afternoon, it had destroyed between 190,000 and 300,000 books of the total 12 million housed. About 3.5 million volumes initially became damp due to firefighting foam.
	Norwich Library	Norwich, England	United Kingdom	1994-08-01	On August 1, 1994, Norwich Central Library caught fire due to an electrical fault. Over one hundred firefighters responded as the flames escalated and smoke became visible from twenty miles away. Over 100,000 books and thousands of historical documents were destroyed.
	Iraq National Library	Baghdad	Iraq	2003-04-15	Arson fire.
	Duchess Anna Amalia Library	Weimar	Germany	2004-09-02	
	Glasgow School of Art, Rennie Mackintosh Library	Glasgow, Scotland	United Kingdom	2014-05-24 & 2018-06-15	Tn 2014, a fire began inside the Charles Rennie Mackintosh building at the Glasgow School of Art. The library was lost in the blaze but there were no injuries. The fire began after gases from an expanding foam canister being used in a student project were ignited by a sparking projector but the building's recently installed fire suppression system was not yet operational. While the building was under renovation, a second, more severe, fire broke out on June 15, 2018. The fire destroyed all of the building's renovation progress, as well as part of the school that had been left untouched by the first fire. A complete restoration was expected to be complete by 2030, but that was put into doubt in 2026 when it was announced the cost would be too high.
	Institute of Scientific Information on Social Sciences (INION)	Moscow	Russia	2015-01-31	
	Mzuzu University Library	Mzuzu	Malawi	2015-12-18	In the early hours of December 18, 2015, the library caught fire. Although its wooden structure and carpeting allowed flames to spread rapidly, students, staff, and firefighters rescued some materials by carrying them out of the building. But by 5:00 a.m. the library collapsed, resulting in the loss of 45,000 volumes. A sudden rainstorm heightened the damage by soaking materials that had been carried out of the burning building.
	National Museum of Brazil	Quinta da Boa Vista in Rio de Janeiro	Brazil	2018-09-02	Not yet investigated. See National Museum of Brazil fire. Museum library was also destroyed.
	Jagger Library (partially)	Cape Town	South Africa	2021-04-18	Partially destroyed by the 2021 Table Mountain fire. However, the library's fire detection systems stopped the destruction of the entire collection.

== See also ==
- Book burning
- Library damage resulting from the 2004 Indian Ocean earthquake
- List of book-burning incidents
- List of destroyed heritage
- List of libraries damaged during World War II
- Planned destruction of Warsaw
- Rongorongo § Destruction
- Siege of Sarajevo (1992–1996)
- The Enemies of Books
