= Center for Documentation and Information of Aceh =

- Pusat Dokumentasi dan Informasi Aceh

General information
- Location: Banda Aceh, Indonesia
- Address: Jl. Sultan Alaidin Mahmudsyah
- Coordinates: 5.5490°N 95.3210°E

Website
- pdiaaceh.org

The Center for Documentation and Information of Aceh (Indonesian: Pusat Dokumentasi dan Informasi Aceh), known for its collection of rare books and manuscripts chronicling the heritage of Aceh, was completely destroyed during 2004 Indian Ocean earthquake. Only half of the building remained standing, and the entire collection was swept away. A team from the National Library of Indonesia visiting in January 2005 was able to salvage only three books and one sheet of the genealogy of the Muslim kings of Aceh. These were taken to Jakarta for restoration.

== See also ==
- Library damage resulting from the 2004 Indian Ocean earthquake
- List of destroyed libraries, archives and museums
