= Hoshino Library =

The Hoshino Library (星野文庫, Hoshino bunko) was a collection of about 10,000 books that were destroyed in the 1923 Great Kantō earthquake and following fires in Japan. The books were the former possessions of Hoshino Hisashi before becoming part of the library of Tokyo University and were mainly about Chinese philosophy and history.

== See also ==
- Destruction of libraries
