= Nishimura Library =

The Nishimura Library (西村文庫, Nishimura bunko) was a collection of about 10,000 books that were destroyed in the 1923 Great Kantō earthquake and following fires in Japan. The books were the former possessions of Nishimura Shigeki before becoming part of the library of Tokyo University and were mainly about Chinese philosophy and history.

== See also ==
- List of destroyed libraries
