= Max Müller Library =

Library in Japan

Coordinates: 28.6238°N 77.2242°E

The Max Müller Library was a library in Japan named after Max Müller, and held books mainly focused on languages and religion. It was badly damaged during the Great Kantō Earthquake in September 1923.

== See also ==
- List of destroyed libraries
- Timeline of Japanese history
