= Imperial Library of Constantinople =

Ancient library

Coordinates: 40.9961°N 28.9286°E

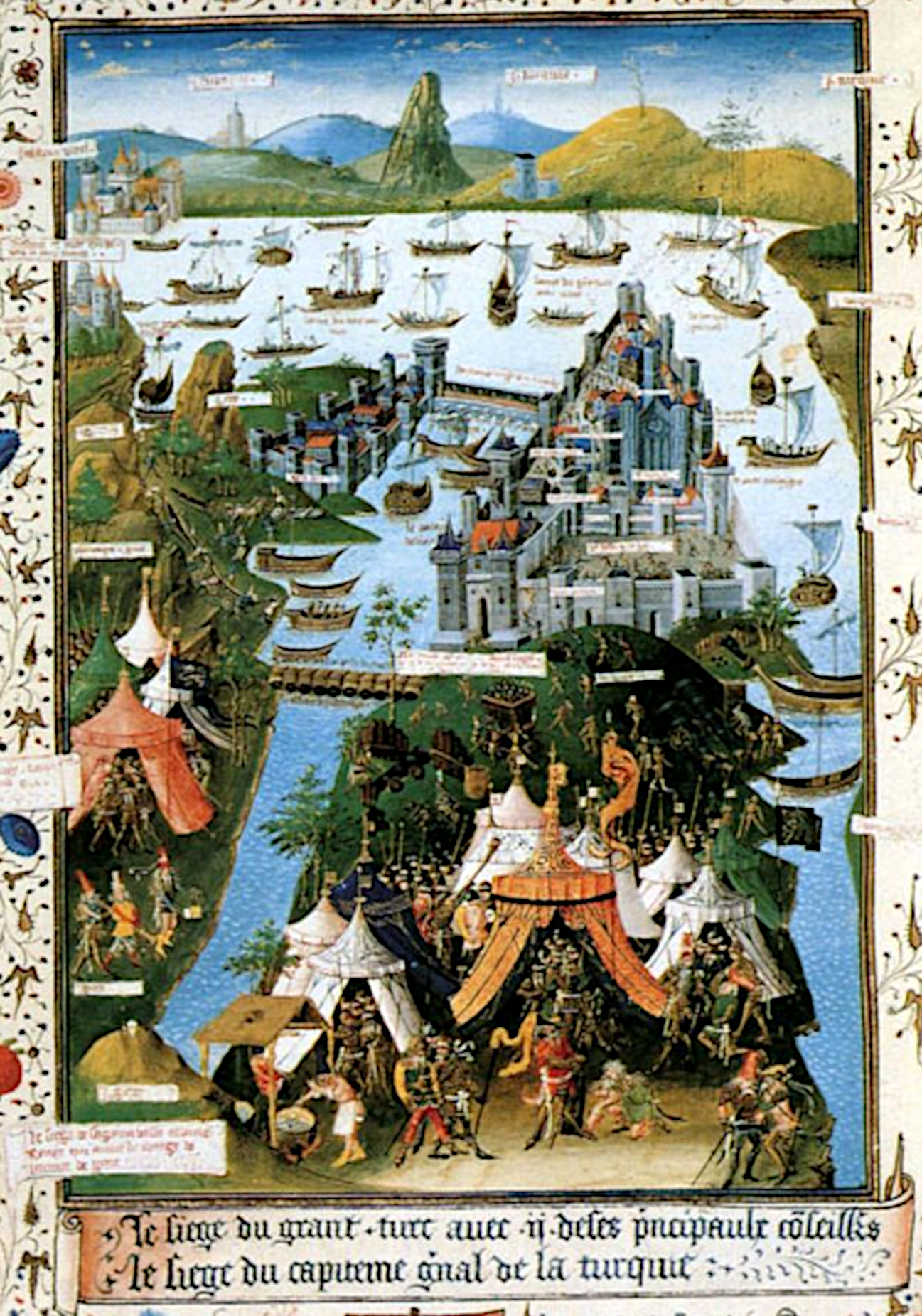
Depiction of the Siege of Constantinople

The Imperial Library of Constantinople, in the capital city of the Byzantine Empire, was the last of the great libraries of the ancient world. Long after the destruction of the Great Library of Alexandria and the other ancient libraries, it preserved the knowledge of the ancient Greeks and Romans for almost 1,000 years. A series of unintentional fires over the years and wartime damage, including the raids of the Fourth Crusade in 1204, affected the building and its contents. While there were many reports of texts surviving into the Ottoman era, no substantive portion of the library has ever been recovered. The library was founded by Constantius II (reigned 337–361 AD), who established a scriptorium so that the surviving works of Greek literature could be copied for preservation. The Emperor Valens in 372 employed four Greek and three Latin scribes. The majority of Greek classics known today are known through Byzantine copies originating from the Imperial Library of Constantinople.

== History ==
In ancient Greece, the written word and most literature was transcribed onto papyrus. As the papyrus began to deteriorate, there was a movement to transfer the reading material from papyrus to parchment, as did Constantine the Great around the 4th century, but his movement specifically concerned scripture. Constantine's successor, Constantius II, continued this movement. It was his work that culminated in the first Imperial Library of Constantinople. The library is estimated to have contained well over 100,000 volumes of ancient text. The movement was headed by one Themistius, who commanded a group of calligraphers and librarians.

=== Agathon ===
Agathon the Reader was the first Reader, then the Librarian at Constantinople: in 680 AD, during his Readership, he was Notary or Reporter at the Third Council of Constantinople, which condemned the monothelite heresy. He sent copies of the acts, written by himself, to the five Patriarchates. In 712 AD he wrote a short treatise, still extant in Greek, on the attempts of Philippicus Bardanes to revive monothelitism.

== Contents of the library ==
Those working on the transfer of the ancient papyrus texts to parchment dedicated a great deal of time and attention to prioritizing what warranted being preserved. Older works like Homer and the Hellenistic history were given priority over Latin works. Constantinople’s imperial collection was said to have a scroll of Homer’s works one hundred and twenty feet long, written in gold ink. Also prioritized were older works, like the works of the Attic period. Works like Sophocles and other authors, whose works focused on grammar and text, were chosen over less used or contemporary works. Due to this form of selective preservation, many works which were known to Themistios, and that he mentions like the triad of Stoic philosophers, are now lost. Some fragments of these lost works have been found at archaeological excavations in Herculaneum.

For papyrus texts that were not translatable, the group attempted to preserve them from decay by encasing them in parchment.

Spaniard Pero Tafur visited Constantinople in 1437 and described the Imperial Library as containing many books, ancient writings, histories, and gaming boards, with simple and durable furnishings and plain stone benches and tables.

== The destruction of the library ==
Over the centuries, several fires in the Library of Constantinople destroyed much of the collection. The library was burnt in the year 473 and about 120,000 volumes were lost. However, the attempts of Themistios and Constantius were not fruitless, as some works were saved and recopied and circulated through other texts. Consequently, modern knowledge of Ancient Greek literature is greater than would be the case if not for their efforts.

After the fall of Constantinople on 12 April 1204, the library was destroyed by the Franks and Venetians of the Fourth Crusade during the sacking of the city. Donald Queller notes that while some manuscripts were probably lost in the three fires that ravaged the city during the attack by the crusaders, there is no indication of the continued existence of a formal imperial library at the time and no source mentions lost manuscripts.

While there were many reports of texts surviving into the Ottoman era, no substantive portion of the library has ever been recovered. Joseph Dacre Carlyle was provided access in 1800 to the Seraglio, the supposed repository of post-Ottoman conquest surviving texts, but no texts from the Imperial Library were located. A notable exception is the Archimedes Palimpsest, which surfaced in 1840, was translated in 1915 and was unaccountably found in a private collection and sold in 1998.

== Existence of a single Library of Constantinople ==
Whether there was a single Imperial Library of Constantinople, resembling those of classical Rome and Alexandria, remains questionable. Historians note that no public libraries existed in Constantinople after the 5th century, although there were numerous church and monastical ones. While it is probable that scholars were given access to at least some of these, their content would have been mainly theological. The Byzantine Empire was a highly literate society by medieval standards but the lay libraries that remained in existence were privately owned collections.

== See also ==
- Magnaura
- Destruction of libraries
- Monastery of Stoudios
- University of Constantinople
- Załuski Library - the oldest modern public library

== Bibliography ==
Notes

References

- Harris, Michael H. (1999). History of Libraries of the Western World (1999 ed.). Scarecrow Press. ISBN 9780810877153. – Total pages: 159
