= Northborough, Cambridgeshire =

Village in Cambridgeshire, England

Coordinates: 52.65°N 0.283°W

Northborough
- Location within Cambridgeshire
- Population: 1,318
- Unitary authority: Peterborough
- Ceremonial county: Cambridgeshire
- Region: East
- Country: England
- Sovereign state: United Kingdom
- Post town: Peterborough
- Postcode district: PE6

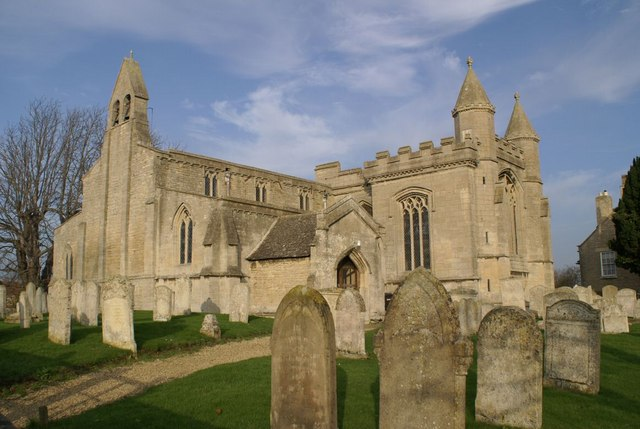
St Andrew's Church

Northborough is a small village and civil parish in the Peterborough district, in the ceremonial county of Cambridgeshire, England. It has a pub, a shop, a school and a small castle. Northborough is around eight miles north of the city of Peterborough and one mile south of village of Deeping Gate and the Lincolnshire border.

The place-name "Northborough" is first attested in the Anglo-Saxon Chronicle for the year 656, where it appears as Northburh. In an Assize Roll of 1202 it appears as Norburg. The name means 'northern burg or fortified settlement'.

Northborough Manor House is a fortified manor house, largely built by Roger de Norburgh in the early fourteenth century. A short way away is the parish church of St Andrew, of which the original Norman sections date back to the late twelfth century. After the restoration of the monarchy, Elizabeth Cromwell, widow of Oliver, lived with John Claypole (her son in law) and is said to be buried in this church. However, there is no grave-stone or marker to be seen.

The village underwent its largest change in the 1970s, when it expanded hugely with the building of the new estate, increasing the population of the village.

Northborough also has a small primary school, which also takes children from other neighbouring villages, such as Maxey and Peakirk. Until relatively recently, the school was housed in the School House, almost opposite the manor along the Lincoln Road. Then, as the village grew, it moved to a new, larger and better equipped site. The school benefits from a large field and adjoining orchard.
