= Charles A. Halbert Public Library =

Library in Saint Kitts and Nevis

Coordinates: 17°17′46.8″N 62°43′52.6″W

The Charles A. Halbert Public Library is the main library in Saint Kitts and Nevis. In 1982 a fire destroyed the entire building.

After a number of years in a temporary setting it moved into a new permanent setting in 1997.

== See also ==
- List of national libraries
- Library fires
