= National Library of Nicaragua Rubén Darío =

Coordinates: 12.15576°N 86.27212°W

The National Library of Nicaragua Rubén Darío is the national library of Nicaragua, located in the city of Managua. It was founded in 1880, and damaged in the 1931 earthquake. Another earthquake in 1972 caused further damage, furthermore, it was looted. One of its librarians was the poet Rubén Darío, in whose honour it was renamed. The total stock of the library is 120,000 volumes.

== Directors ==
Directors of the library:

- Modesto Barrios
- Miguel Ramírez Goyena
- Ramón Romero Martínez
- Carlos Bravo
- Eduardo Zepeda-Henríquez
- Lisandro Chávez Alfaro
- Fidel Coloma González

== See also ==
- Destruction of libraries
