= Library damage resulting from the 2004 Indian Ocean earthquake =

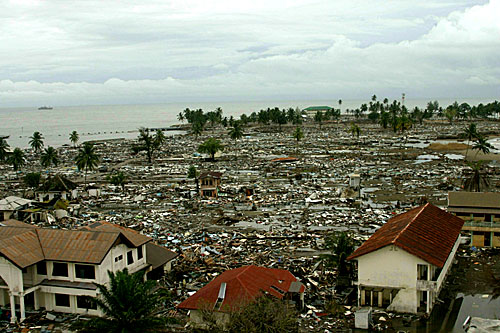
An aerial view of the coastal city of Meulaboh, Indonesia, after the tsunami. The public library in Meulaboh was destroyed.

On December 26, the massive 2004 Indian Ocean earthquake struck off the northwest coast of the Indonesian island of Sumatra. The resulting tsunamis killed more than 180,000 people. In addition to the loss of human lives, cultural institutions were destroyed in several Asian nations. Libraries in six Asian countries were reported to be damaged; those on the eastern coast of Sri Lanka and the northern province of Aceh on Sumatra were most severely affected by the disaster.

== India ==
Damage to libraries in India has not been well documented. Water damage was reported at Madras University Library in Chennai. The Asian Development Bank reports extensive damage to schools in the Indian states of Kerala and Tamil Nadu. A government assessment found that 252 schools in Tamil Nadu need complete reconstruction, 19 need major repairs and 49 need minor repairs.

In the Andaman and Nicobar Islands, 78 teachers are listed as killed or missing. Further, 25 percent of primary schools, 33 percent of upper primary schools, and 31 percent of senior secondary schools were seriously damaged, indicating that school libraries in the region also suffered damage.

== Indonesia ==
The Sumatran province of Aceh was severely damaged by the earthquake and resulting tsunami. An estimated 167,736 Indonesians were killed and 25% of Achenese lost their source of livelihood. Banda Aceh, Aceh's capital, was the closest major city to the earthquake's epicenter, and many of its major libraries suffered extensive damage.

The Aceh Provincial Library (BPD) was inundated with three meters of water. Twenty three staff members were killed, including the library's director, Bachtiar Azis, who is listed as missing along with his family. In addition to loss of life, the BPD suffered physical damage and a near total loss of its collection. Concrete and steel fences surrounding the two-story building were mostly destroyed, however, the building itself remained standing. All library materials housed on the first floor were swept away by the waves and the floor was covered in 30 cm-thick mud. These lost materials comprise most of its children's, young adult and adult collections. The water did not reach the second floor, but looting resulted in the loss of most materials and equipment. A collection of books received under legal deposit and housed on the second floor was left undisturbed and survived the disaster and looting intact. Despite these losses, the BPD reopened to the public in May 2005. As of August 2005, repairs were still being made to the building, the library lacked computers for its warintek (information technology section), and most areas of the library needed furnishing and collection replacement.

Of Aceh's eight public libraries, two were destroyed. These libraries were located in the hard-hit cities of Meulaboh and Sigli.

Mobile library units, or perpustakaan keliling, are used to serve rural areas of Aceh. Days before the earthquake and tsunami, the BPD had received two newly built mobile library units from the National Library of Indonesia. Both of these were destroyed along with the rest of the mobile libraries parked on the BPD's carport. In July 2005, the National Library donated two replacement mobile units, however the new BPD director noted that further units were needed to adequately serve outlying regions of the province.

The Aceh Documentation and Information Center, known for its collection of rare books and manuscripts chronicling the heritage of Aceh, was destroyed. Only half of the building remained standing, and the entire collection was swept away. A team from the National Library of Indonesia visiting in January 2005 was able to salvage only three books and one sheet of the genealogy of the Muslim kings of Aceh. These were taken to Jakarta for restoration.

The Provincial Archives Agency lost 80 percent of the photographs in its collection. The Secretariat Office of the Aceh Province lost 160 boxes of records.

The Aceh branch of the National Land Register Agency was inundated with water. Roughly 629 boxes of materials certifying individual land ownership in the province were damaged. Due to the efforts of a team of conservators from Japan and archivists from the National Archives in Jakarta, many of these land register documents were preserved.

Damage to school libraries has not been well documented. The Indonesia National Library reports that SMA 1, a high school in Banda Aceh, was not damaged by flood waters as it is located on the second floor, however, did experience some earthquake damage. Overall, 2,364 teachers and staff members were killed and 2,240 schools were destroyed on Sumatra and its outlying islands.

The Central Library at the Ar-Raniri Institute for Islamic Studies, a public Islamic University in Banda Aceh, lost its information servers due to theft and seawater damage.

Baiturrahman Grand Mosque Library in Banda Aceh lost its entire collection. Due to the mosque's central location and importance to the community, a concerted effort was made to clear and repair this complex of buildings immediately after the tsunami. As of August 2005 the library had reopened with 1,200 books in its collection. The library of the Agricultural Information Institute of Banda Aceh was inundated with water from the tsunami but its physical structure remained intact.

The Library and Museum of the Ali Hasymy Educational Foundation survived intact as the tsunami did not reach this area of Banda Aceh.

== Malaysia ==
According to a Malaysian professor of library science, damage to libraries was minimal in Malaysia.

== Maldives ==
All of the 199 inhabited islands comprising the Maldives atolls were affected by the tsunami. The Maldives Library Association was not able to survey all public libraries across the atoll, however, a representative indicated some libraries were destroyed.

Forty-six percent of schools in the Maldives were damaged, and nine schools were destroyed.

== Thailand ==
Damage to libraries in Thailand has not been well documented. The Ministry of Education has reported that five schools were destroyed and 51 schools were damaged.

== Sri Lanka ==
More than 35,000 Sri Lankans were killed and 516,000 people were displaced as a result of the tsunami. Roughly 60 percent of the coastal area of Sri Lanka was severely affected by the tsunami. Libraries across the country were damaged, and it is estimated that 1.2 million volumes of books and other reading materials were destroyed in the disaster. Out of the 950 public libraries in Sri Lanka, 55 libraries were affected and 28 were destroyed. Several libraries were used as refuge centres or hospitals in the aftermath of the tsunami, and surviving furniture and collections suffered as a result.

One estimate of damage to school libraries in Sri Lanka indicates that of the 9,790 schools in the country, 182 schools were directly affected by the tsunami and an additional 282 schools were damaged because of their use as refugee camps after the tsunami. While not all of these schools had a full-fledged library, most had a book closet or other collection of materials. At least 165 school libraries were damaged by the tsunami. Compounding the damage, many schools had large collection of textbooks on hand for distribution to students at the beginning of the school year in January. Damage reports range from furniture damage to lost collections to complete destruction of the physical building.

Sri Lankan government departments lost public records to the tsunami. In the Southern province, all electoral registers were destroyed, along with 600,000 land deeds from the Department of the Surveyor General.

Sixty-eight libraries affiliated with religious institutions and at least three museums were damaged by the tsunami. Many of these libraries were attached to Buddhist temples and contained valuable collections of palm leaf manuscripts and documents relating to Ayurveda, the Indian medical tradition adopted in ancient Sri Lanka.

The National Maritime Museum in Galle lost 90 percent of its collection, mostly artifacts salvaged from underwater wrecks and archaeology sites. The museum also lost all of its computers and other technical equipment. The collection housed in the Martin Wickramasinghe Folk Museum of Koggala survived relatively unscathed, however the children's library attached to the museum was severely damaged along with most of the museum's furniture. The Maritime Archaeology Unit of the Central Cultural Fund was also severely damaged, resulting in the loss of artifacts from an 18th-century Dutch shipwreck that were eventually to be donated to a museum.

In the weeks following the disaster, the International Federation of Library Associations and Institutions cooperated with UNESCO, the Sri Lanka Library Association, the National Library and Documentation Center of Sri Lanka and other organizations to create the Sri Lanka Disaster Management Committee for Libraries, Information Services and Archives (SL DMC-LISA). The committee worked to secure funding for temporary libraries and computer equipment and began reviewing architectural plans for rebuilding libraries. Further initiatives were developed to encourage "twinning" or pairing of Sri Lankan libraries with donors.

In addition to working with the disaster committee, the Sri Lanka Library Association targeted five libraries for rebuilding with the intent of creating model institutions. As of 2006, three of these libraries had re-opened, while progress on the other two was delayed due to political instability in the region.

== See also ==
- List of destroyed libraries
