= Northborough Manor House =

Manor house in Northborough, Cambridgeshire, England

Northborough Castle Farmhouse
- Cambridgeshire, England
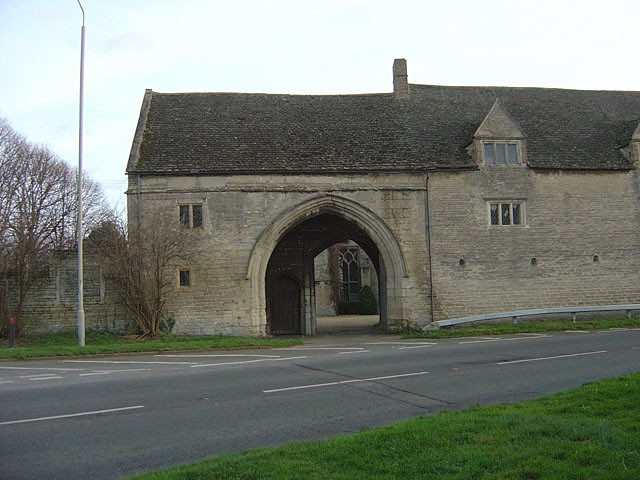
- The gatehouse to Northborough Castle

Site information
- Type: Fortified manor house

Location
- Shown within Cambridgeshire
- Location within Cambridgeshire
- Coordinates: 52.6557°N 0.2998°W
- Grid reference: grid reference TF151078

Site history
- Materials: Rubble masonry and dressed masonry

Northborough Manor House, also known as Northborough Hall or Northborough Castle Farmhouse, is a medieval fortified manor house, and Grade I listed building in the village of Northborough in Cambridgeshire, England.

== History ==
Northborough Castle was built between 1333 and 1336 by Roger Northburgh, the Bishop of Lichfield; of the original manor, only the gatehouse and the hall still survive. The result, according to historian Anthony Emery, was "one of the finest" fortified manors in Cambridgeshire. The gatehouse is dominated by a huge gateway, which, whilst it did not have a drawbridge or portcullis, provided considerable protection to the manor behind it. The hall typified the 14th-century fashion for improved lighting, with bay windows placed regularly along the line of the hall, and was decorated with wall paintings. Some 16th and 17th-century extensions to the castle were made.

The manor was sold to James Claypole in 1565, and sold to Lord Fitzwilliam in 1681. It was reputedly visited by Oliver Cromwell. In the 1970s it was purchased by garden book author Roy Genders. Today, the gatehouse is available for holiday lets, and the manor is open to visitors by appointment.

== See also ==
- Castles in Great Britain and Ireland
- List of castles in England

== Bibliography ==
- Astley, H. J. D. (1899) "Northborough church and manor house," in The Journal of the British Archaeological Association Vol. 5 pp. 129–40.
- Emery, Anthony. (2007) Discovering Medieval Houses. Risborough, UK: Shire Publishing. ISBN 978-0-7478-0655-4.
- Emery, Anthony. (2006) Greater Medieval Houses of England and Wales, 1300–1500: Southern England. Cambridge: Cambridge University Press. ISBN 978-0-521-58132-5.
