= Raglan Castle =

Late medieval castle in Monmouthshire, Wales

- Castell Rhaglan (Welsh) (Note: Since 2024, Cadw, who administer the site, are to use the Welsh name only, but have not yet done so as of 2026.)
- Monmouthshire, Wales
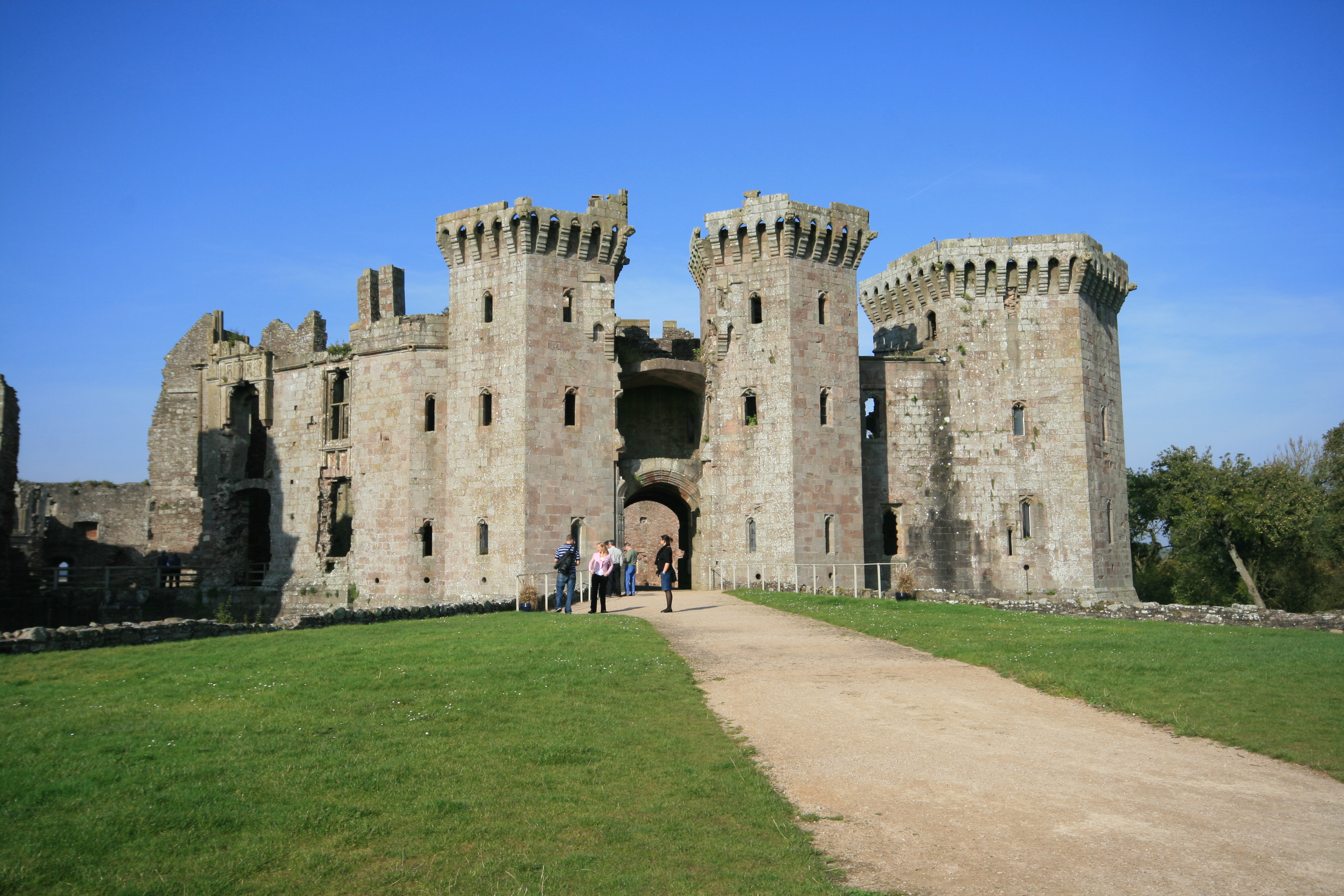
- Raglan Castle, main gatehouse, south-east front

Site information
- Owner: Duke of Beaufort
- Controlled by: Cadw
- Open to the public: Yes
- Condition: Ruined
- Website: Raglan Castle (Cadw)

Location
- Shown within Monmouthshire
- Location within Monmouthshire
- Coordinates: 51.7703°N 2.8521°W
- Grid reference: grid reference SO413083

Site history
- Materials: Redbrook Sandstone, Old Red Sandstone, Bath Stone
- Battles/wars: Siege of 1646 during the First English Civil War

Listed Building – Grade I
- Designated: 19 November 1953
- Reference no.: 2101

Scheduled monument
- Designated: 9 February 1948
- Reference no.: MM005

Cadw/ICOMOS Register of Parks and Gardens of Special Historic Interest in Wales
- Designated: 1 February 2022
- Reference no.: PGW(Gt)42(MON)
- Listing: Grade I

Raglan Castle (Welsh: Castell Rhaglan) is a late medieval castle located just north of the village of Raglan in the county of Monmouthshire in south east Wales. The modern castle dates from between the 15th and early 17th centuries, when the successive ruling families of the Herberts and the Somersets created a luxurious, fortified castle, complete with a large hexagonal keep, known as the Great Tower or the Yellow Tower of Gwent. Surrounded by parkland, water gardens and terraces, the castle was considered by contemporaries to be the equal of any other in England or Wales.

During the First English Civil War, Raglan was occupied by a Royalist garrison on behalf of Charles I but was taken by Parliamentarian forces in 1646 and its walls slighted, or deliberately put beyond military use. After the Stuart Restoration in 1660, the Somersets declined to restore it and it became first a source of local building materials, then a romantic ruin. It is now a tourist attraction.

== History ==
=== Early history of the castle ===
Following the Norman invasion of Wales, the area around the village of Raglan was granted to William FitzOsbern, the Earl of Hereford. Some historians, such as John Kenyon, suspect that an early motte and bailey castle may have been built on the Raglan site during this period: the location had strategic importance and archaeologists have discovered the remains of a possible bailey ditch on the site. The local manor was held by the Bloet family from the late 12th century until the late 14th century, and the family built a manor house somewhere on the site during this period, surrounded by a park. By the late medieval period the Raglan site was surrounded by the large deer parks of Home Park and Red Deer Park, the latter being enclosed at the end of the period.

=== 15th to 16th centuries ===
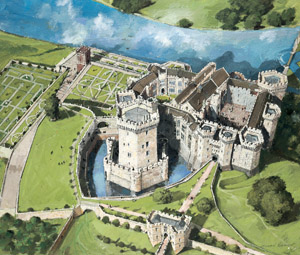
Reconstruction of Raglan Castle around 1620

The current Raglan Castle was begun by Sir William ap Thomas, the lesser son of a minor Welsh family who rose through the ranks of mid-15th century politics, profiting from the benefits of the local offices he held. William married first Elizabeth, a wealthy heiress, and then Gwladus, another heiress who would prove to be a powerful regional figure in her own right. In 1432, Sir William purchased the manor of Raglan, where he had already been staying as a tenant, for 1,000 marks (£666 13s 4d) and commenced a programme of building work that established the basic shape of the castle as seen today, although most of it—with the exception of the South Gate and the Great Tower—was later built over. (Note: It is difficult to accurately compare 15th century and modern prices or incomes. For comparison, an average baron in 1436 enjoyed an annual income of £500.)

Sir William's son dropped the Welsh version of his name, calling himself William Herbert. He continued to rise in prominence, supporting the House of York during the War of the Roses, fighting in the Hundred Years War in France but making his fortune from the Gascon wine trade. He was also closely associated with Welsh politics and status; he was the first Welshman to be made an earl and was described by contemporary poets as the "national deliverer" who might achieve Welsh independence. In the 1460s William used his increasing wealth to remodel Raglan on a much grander scale. The symbolism of the castle architecture may have reflected the Welsh family roots: historian Matthew Johnson has suggested that the polygonal towers were possibly designed to imitate those of Caernarfon Castle, whose architecture carries numerous allusions to the eventual return of a Roman Emperor to Wales. Historian Anthony Emery has described the resulting castle as one of the "last formidable displays of medieval defensive architecture".

There was an important link between Raglan Castle and the surrounding parkland, in particular the Home Park and the Red Deer Park. Historian Robert Liddiard suggests that on the basis of the views from the castle at this time, the structured nature of the parks would have contrasted with the wilderness of the mountain peaks framing the scene beyond, making an important statement about the refinement and cultured nature of the castle lord. In the 15th century there were also extensive orchards and fish ponds surrounding the castle, favourably commented upon by contemporaries.

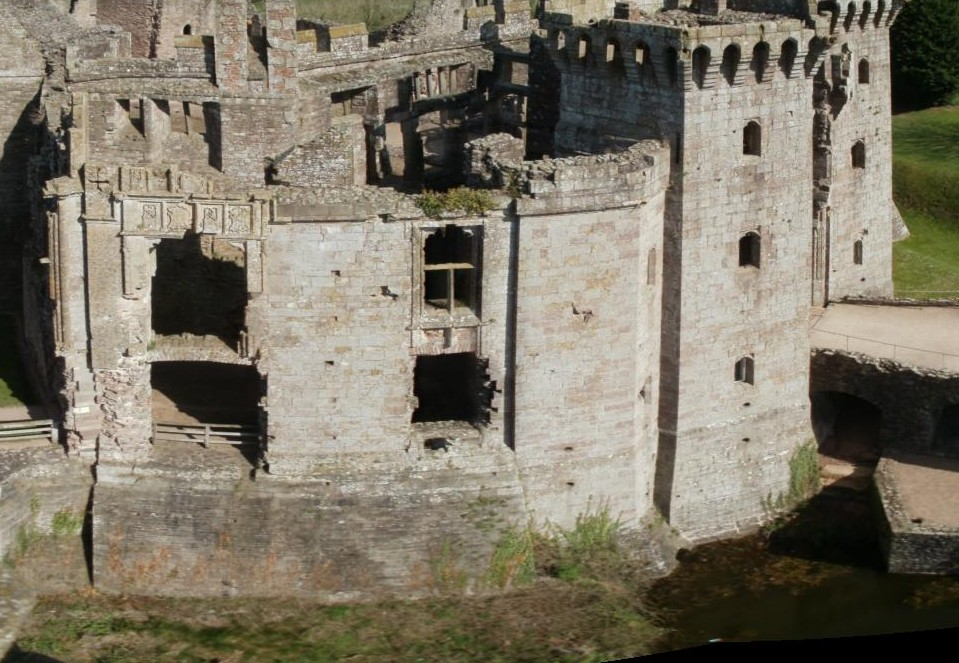
The state apartments (left), library (centre) and gatehouse (right)

William Herbert was executed as a Yorkist supporter in 1469 after the Battle of Edgecote Moor. Building work may have stopped for a period under his son, also called William Herbert, before recommencing in the late 1470s. By 1492, the castle passed to Elizabeth Somerset, William Herbert's daughter, who married Sir Charles Somerset, passing the castle into a new family line.

Sir Charles Somerset was politically successful under both Henry VII and Henry VIII, being made the Earl of Worcester. His son, Henry Somerset, died shortly after inheriting Raglan, but not before using lead reclaimed from Tintern Abbey to help the building work at Raglan Castle during the dissolution of the monasteries. His son and grandson, William Somerset and Edward Somerset, proved to be what John Kenyon describes as "wealthy, brilliant and cultured men". William rebuilt much of the Pitched Stone Court, including the hall, adding the Long Gallery and developing the gardens into the new Renaissance style. The Somerset family owned two key castles in the region, Raglan and Chepstow, and these appeared to have figured prominently as important status symbols in paintings owned by the family.

=== 17th century ===
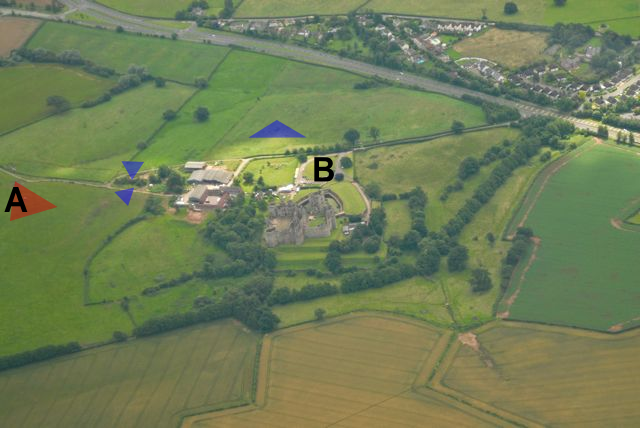
Aerial photograph, showing the defences constructed during the First English Civil War; red and blue triangles represent the location of Parliamentarian and Royalist earthwork bastions; A and B indicate the locations of the Parliamentary and Royalist artillery batteries.

Edward Somerset made minor improvements to the interior of the castle at the start of the 17th century, but focused primarily on the exterior, expanding and developing the gardens and building the moat walk around the Great Tower. The resulting gardens were considered the equal of any others in the kingdom at the time.

Upon inheriting Raglan in 1628, Henry Somerset, then the 5th Earl of Worcester, continued to live a grand lifestyle in the castle in the 1630s, with a host of staff, including a steward, Master of Horse, Master of Fishponds, surveyors, auditors, ushers, a falconer and many footmen. The interior walls were hung with rich tapestries from Arras in France, while an inventory taken in 1639 recorded a large number of silver and gilt plate kept in the Great Tower, including an ostrich egg cup, and a silver basket for oranges and lemons, then luxury items in Wales. Mead was a popular drink in the castle, but contemporaries described the castle as being a particular sober and respectful community. Henry developed the entrance route to the castle, including building the Red Gate. His son Edward, Lord Herbert became famous for building a "water commanding machine" in the Great Tower, which used steam to pump a huge spout of water high into the air from the moat.

In August 1642 the First English Civil War began between Royalist supporters of Charles I and Parliament. Raglan Castle was still held by Henry, then an elderly man, supported by his son, Lord Herbert. Both men were firm royalists. King Charles sent his own son, Prince Charles, on a fund-raising tour of friendly regions, starting with Raglan Castle in October 1642, following which Henry was promoted to be the first Marquess of Worcester. Tensions grew in the immediate region, partially driven by religious tensions between some of the more Protestant local people and the Roman Catholic Marquess; on one of these occasions a local group attempted to search the castle, but were reportedly driven away by the sudden noise of Lord Herbert's steam-engine. The defences of Raglan were improved after this, with modern earthwork bastions built around the castle and a powder mill created; a garrison of around 300 men was established at a cost of £40,000. (Note: It is difficult to accurately compare 17th century and modern prices or incomes. £40,000 could equate to between £5,510,000 to £63,700,000, depending on the measure used. For comparison, the Marquess's annual income was believed to be around £20,000 a year.) Heavier cannon were installed in the bastions, with lighter pieces placed in the castle towers.

Lord Herbert left the castle to join the campaign against Parliament, returning at intervals to acquire more funds for the war. Charles I himself visited the castle twice, first in June 1645 after the battle of Naseby and again in 1646, when he enjoyed playing bowls on the castle's green. The Royalist cause was now close to military collapse, and the Marquess started to send some valuables, including the oak panelling from the parlour, some plaster ceiling and many pictures, to his brother at nearby Troy House for safe-keeping. Lord Herbert was captured in Ireland, and an attack on Raglan itself appeared imminent.

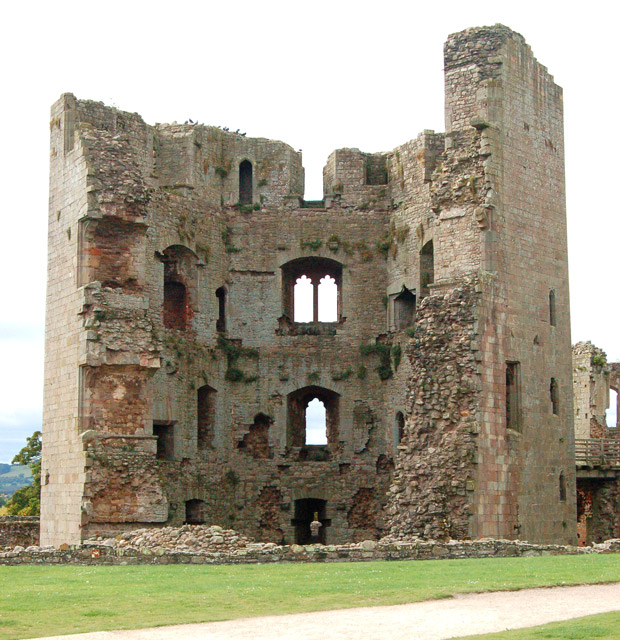
The slighted side of the Great Tower

In expectation of a siege, the castle garrison was increased to around 800 soldiers; the avenue of trees outside the castle gates were cut down, and neighbouring buildings destroyed to prevent their being used by Parliamentary forces. Large amounts of food were brought in to support the growing castle community, which also included a number of the wider Herbert family and other regional Royalist leaders who had sought shelter there. The first Parliamentary army arrived in early June, under the command of Colonel Morgan and Sir Trevor Williams. After several calls for the castle to surrender, a siege ensued, lasting through the summer months. In August, additional Parliamentarian forces under General Fairfax arrived, and calls for the castle to surrender were renewed. Fairfax's men began to dig trenches towards the castle, and used these to move mortars forward, probably including the famous "Roaring Meg", bringing the interior of the castle into artillery range. Facing a hopeless situation, the Marquess surrendered the castle on 19 August on relatively generous terms for the garrison. The Marquess himself was arrested and sent to Windsor Castle, where he died shortly afterwards. Informed shortly before his death that Parliament had granted his request to be buried in the family vault at Windsor, the Marquess remarked; "Why then I shall have a better castle when I am dead, than they took from me when alive."

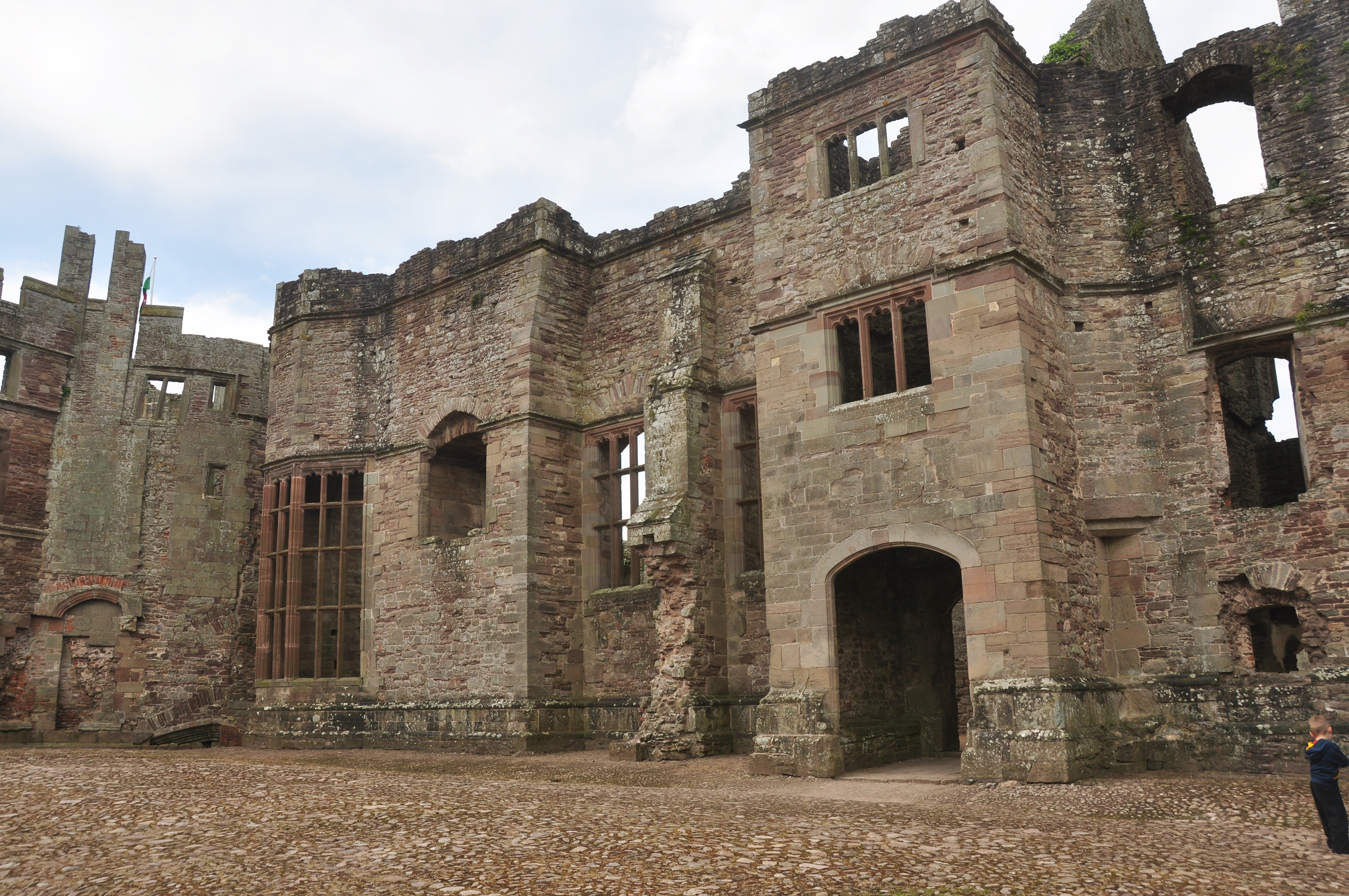
The buttress in the Pitched Stone Court was damaged during the slighting of the castle. Archaeologist Lila Rakoczy suggested that the depth of the stone being removed indicates that a statue or decorative form of stone was originally present, and the removal of high-status and visually prominent material would have been a symbolic act.

Fairfax ordered the castle to be totally destroyed under the supervision of Henry Herbert, a descendant of William ap Thomas. The fortifications proved too strong, however, and only a few of the walls were destroyed, or slighted. Historian Matthew Johnson describes the event as having the atmosphere of a "community festival", as local people dredged the castle moat in search of treasure, and emptied the fishponds of valuable carp. The castle's library, including an important collection of Welsh documents and books, was either stolen or destroyed.

Despite some immediate confiscations after the siege, by the time of the Restoration of Charles II, the Somerset family had managed to recover most of their possessions, including Raglan Castle. Henry Somerset, the 3rd Marquess, decided to prioritise the rebuilding of his other houses at Troy and Badminton, rather than Raglan, reusing some of the property sent away for safety before the war, or salvaged after the slighting.

=== 18th to 21st centuries ===
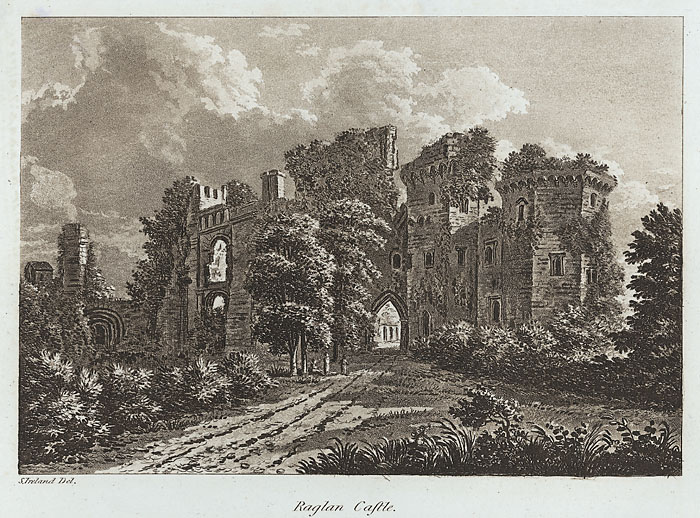
Engraving of the state of the castle in 1798

For the first half of the 18th century, the castle continued to deteriorate, with the Somerset family allowing their stewards to quarry stone from the castle for the repair of other estate buildings. One particular estate surveyor called Hopkins became known as the "Grand Dilapidator", due to the number of chimneys, window frames and staircases he had removed from the castle. Henry Somerset, the 5th Duke, finally put an end to this practice in 1756, and the castle became a tourist attraction, part of the popular Wye Tour. Seats, fences and bridges were installed, and the first guidebook to the site was published in the early 19th century.

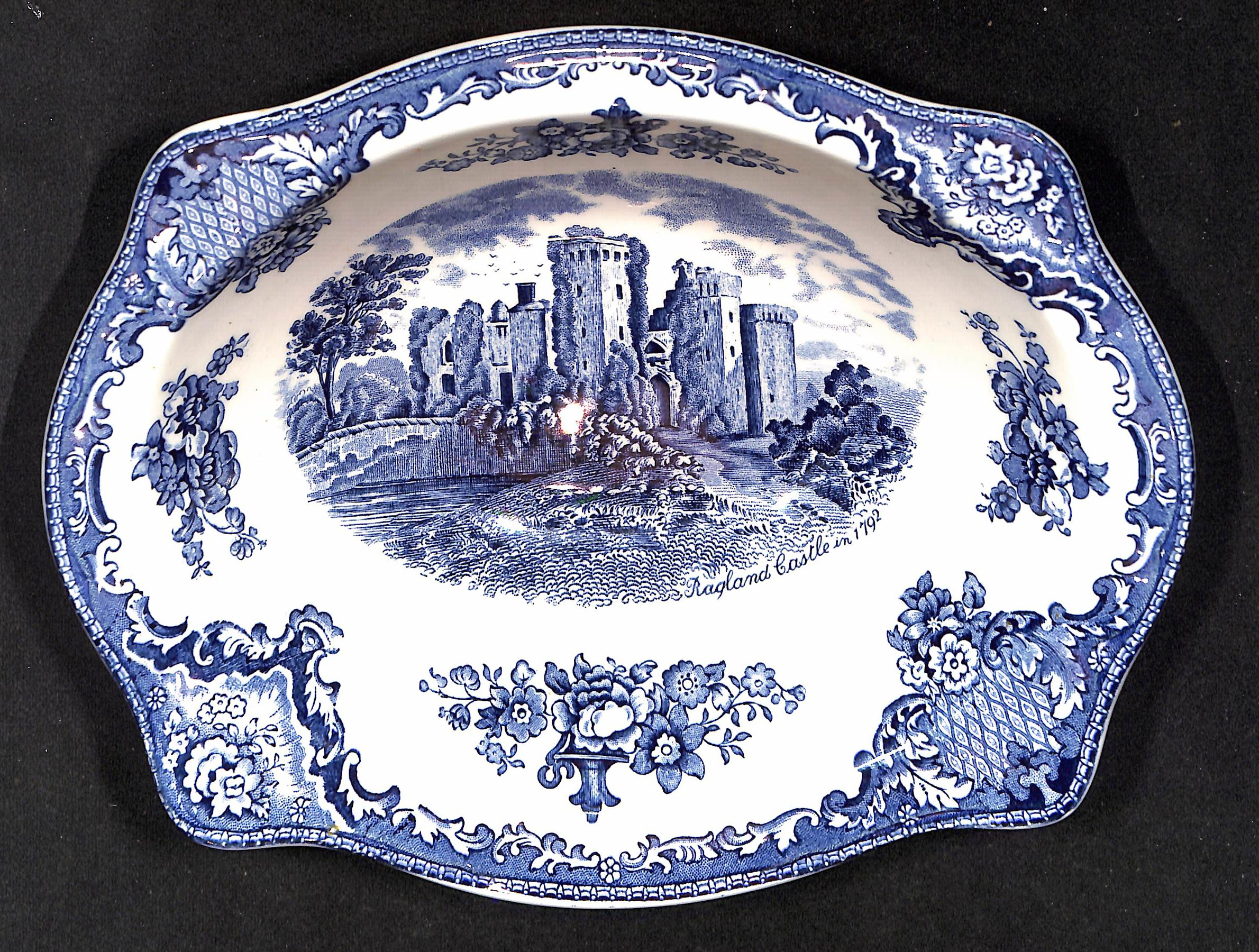

The Great Hall was temporarily re-roofed in the 1820s, when the castle was used for a "Grand Entertainment" by the Somersets, and in 1830 Jeffrey Wyattville was employed to reinstate the Grand Staircase. The Monmouthshire antiquarian Joseph Bradney recorded a visit to the castle by Edward VII and Queen Alexandra, then Prince and Princess of Wales, in October 1881. In 1938 Henry Somerset, the 10th Duke, entrusted guardianship of Raglan Castle to the Commissioner of Works, and the castle became a permanent tourist attraction. Today, the castle is classed as a Grade I listed building and as a Scheduled Monument, administered by Cadw. Between 2003 and 2007 Cambrian Archaeological Projects led excavations at the castle in advance of a planned new visitor centre. Since 2024, Cadw are to standardise the name in both languages, to use the Welsh name Castell Rhaglan in English. Although they have not yet done so as of 2026.

== Architecture ==
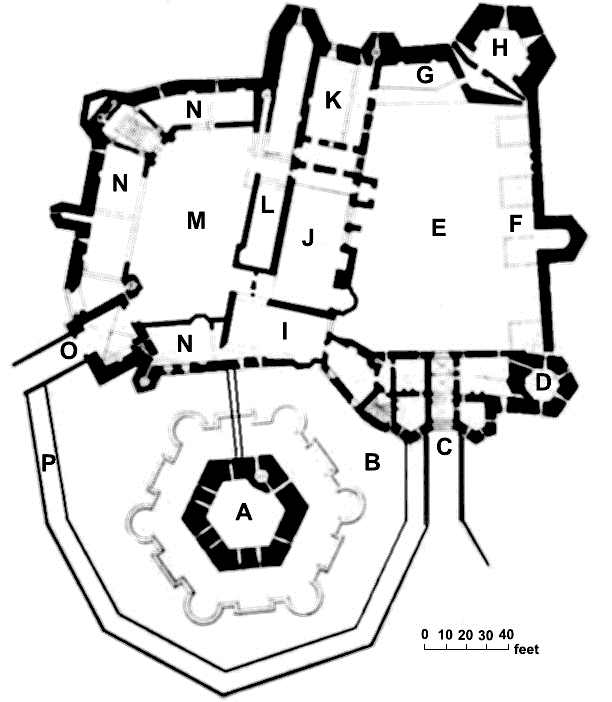
Plan of the castle, after Augustus Pugin: A – Great Tower; B – Moat; C – Gatehouse and bridge; D – Closet Tower; E – Pitched Stone Court; F – Office wing; G – Pantry; H – Kitchen; I – Parlour; J – Hall; K – Buttery; L – Long Gallery; M – Fountain Court; N – Apartments; O – South Gate and bridge; P – Moat walk

Raglan Castle was built in several phases, initial work occurring in the 1420s and 1430s, a major phase in the 1460s, with various alterations and additions at the end of the 16th century. The castle was built in stone, initially pale sandstone from Redbrook, and later Old Red Sandstone, with Bath Stone used for many of the detailed features. Like similar properties of the period, the castle of the 1460s was almost certainly designed to be approached and entered in a particular way, maximising the aesthetic and political value of the fortification. At Raglan, the design highlighted the Great Tower: a typical senior visitor would ride through Raglan village, and first the tower and then the rest of the castle would appear suddenly over the slight rise on the hill. A visitor would have needed to circle the Great Tower and the moat, before coming in through the gatehouse, into the Pitched Stone Court, around the edge of the communal hall, before reaching the previously hidden, and more refined, inner Fountain Court. Only then would a privileged guest be able to enter the Great Tower itself, overlooking the Herbert family's own chambers. Many less senior visitors or servants would never have entered this far, seeing only the external elements of the castle, but perhaps having been impressed by the outside of the Great Tower as they arrived.

There has been much discussion amongst academics about the extent to which Raglan was influenced by contemporary French designs; one school of thought suggests that it was heavily influenced by designs that were then popular in the south of France; others oppose this "diffusionist" school of thought, and argue that there is insufficient evidence to draw such a conclusion. (Note: John Kenyon, for example, champions the links between Raglan and France, particularly the unusual drawbridge style; Anthony Emery argues against this; Matthew Johnson argues the case will never be proved either way.) Another line of debate has been over the nature of the castle's defences, in particular its gunloops. Many castles built around the same time as Raglan appear to have been built with less concern for defences than in the past, their military features more symbolic than real. At Raglan, there are numerous gunloops throughout the castle's defences, but many were ill-placed if the intention was to use them in a conflict; some could barely have been used at all. Traditionally, an evolutionary explanation for this was given: Raglan's gunloops were of an early period, later surpassed in other castles. More recent explanations emphasise the prestigious symbolism of gunloops for the Herbert family when they built the castle, even if many might have been impossible to use. Anthony Emery notes that Raglan's gunloops were better sited than many at the time, and at least "the owner was up to date in his symbolism"; Robert Liddiard suggests that the poor placing of some of the gunloops for aesthetic purposes might have actually been a conversation point for those visitors with experience of fighting in France and the "correct" placing of such defences.

=== Gatehouse and Closet Tower ===
The three-storey gatehouse to Raglan Castle dates from the 1460s and is approached over a stone bridge restored in 1949. Characterised by extensive machicolations and gunloops, the gatehouse would originally have had a twin-set of portcullises and a drawbridge. The intention of the design was at least partially defensive, but was also intended to provide a dramatic and impressive entrance for senior visitors to the castle. The upper part of the gatehouse provided chambers for the constable of the castle. Immediately to the west of the gatehouse was the castle library, once famous for its collection of Welsh literature. On the east side of the gatehouse is the three-storey Closet Tower; this was designed to be integral to the gatehouse, and may have contained the original castle treasury, conveniently accessible by the constable. The Closet Tower was partly altered in later years, possibly to allow the basement to be used as a magazine in the English Civil War.

=== Pitched Stone Court and Fountain Court ===
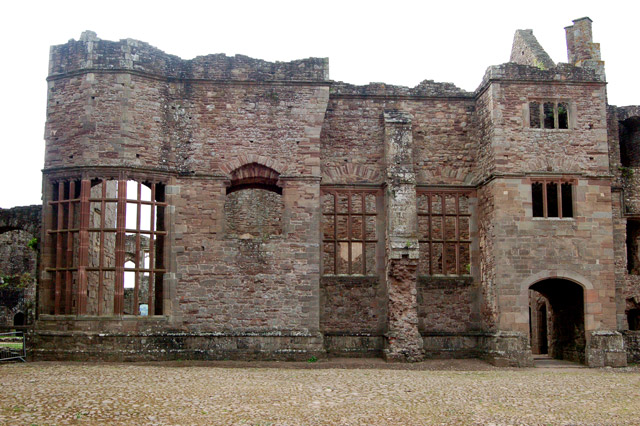
The west side of the Pitched Stone Court, with the hall and its oriel window at left

The Pitched Stone Court forms the north-east corner of the castle, and provided a centre for the castle services and servants; it takes its name from the late-Tudor cobbling, or pitched stones. On the east side of the court is the former office wing, a 16th-century construction mostly destroyed during the siege of 1646. The castle kitchens and pantries are on the north side, containing two large fireplaces and storage facilities for food and supplies in their cellars. In the 1460s, the first floors to these buildings included chambers for the senior servants. The buttery in the north-west corner would have been used to store and serve beer and wine.

On the south-west side of the court is the hall, a 16th-century design incorporating an earlier hall on the same site. 64 by 28 feet (19.5 by 8.5 metres) wide, the hall was originally 42 feet (13 metres) high, with a roof made of Irish oak, lit and ventilated by a cupola in the middle. A large oriel window lit the end of the hall occupied at dinner by the earls of Worcester, which by the time Raglan was built would have been used only for larger formal occasions. Originally, the hall would have been fitted with carved wooden panelling and a minstrel's gallery. The Fountain Court lies to the west of the Pitched Stone Court, and is named after a marble fountain that once stood in the centre of it, featuring a white horse on a black marble base, complete with a flow of running water. The fountain was probably installed somewhat after the initial construction of the court in the 1460s, dating instead to Edward Somerset in the late 16th century; the horse symbolised Edward's prestigious role as Master of the Horse. The Fountain Court was built to provide luxurious accommodation for the family and guests—by the 15th century, it was important to be able to provide private chambers for visitors, and this court could hold up to four distinct groups of visitors in comfort. The Fountain Court as a whole is marked by what Augustus Pugin described as extremely fine, elegant and delicate stonework.

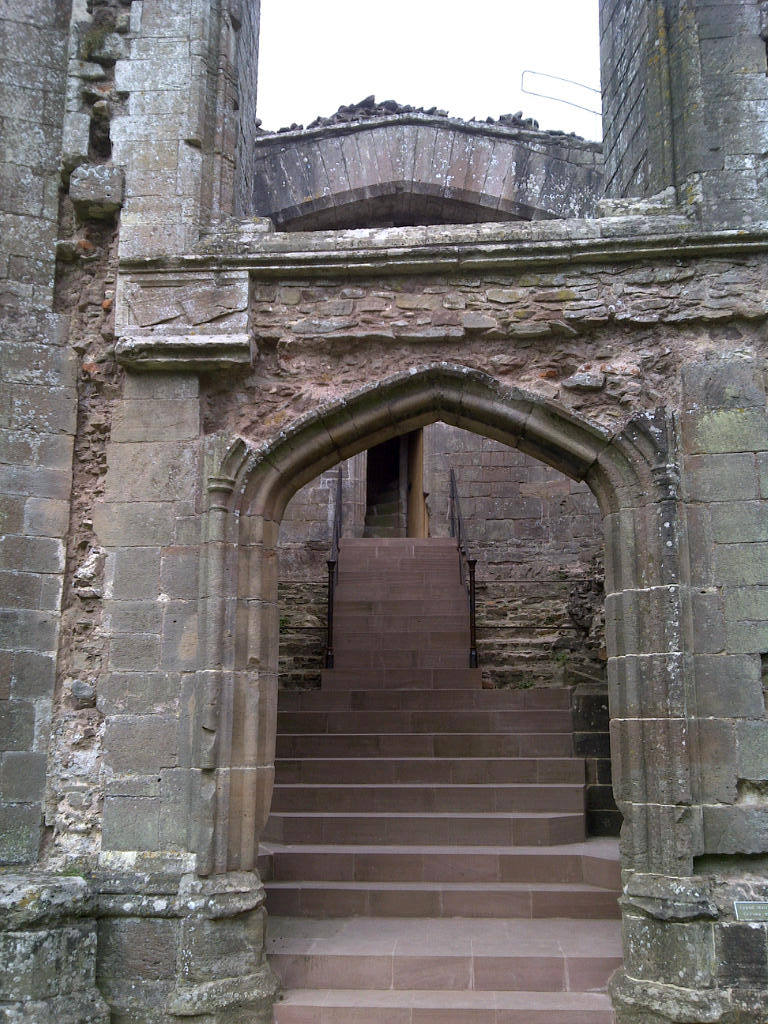
The Grand Staircase to the west of Fountain Court, restored between 2010 and 2011

The castle chapel runs alongside the east side of the court, 41 feet (12 metres) long and originally laid with bright yellow and tiles and decorated with gold and silver vestments. The Long Gallery stretches across the whole east first-floor of the Fountain Court and, although now ruined, would have been a show-piece for the earls' wealth and power. The gallery was 126 feet (38 metres) long and during the Tudor period it would have been wood-panelled throughout and lined with tapestries and paintings. The Long Gallery was intended to allow family and guests to relax inside and to admire the gardens, water gardens and the deer park to the north of the castle. Although most of this decoration has since been lost, two caryatid statues can still be seen on the walls of the Long Gallery, modelled on a work by the French artist Hugues Sambin.

The west side of the Fountain Court comprises the apartments, with a number of bay windows and window seats facing west and north across the park. The Grand Staircase divides the apartments; restored between 2010 and 2011, the staircase would originally have had a substantial porch, similar to the one that survives in the Pitched Stone Court, and would have been a centre-piece of the Fountain Court. Although examples of such straight-flight staircases can be found in other late-medieval buildings, the architectural historian John Newman considers the Grand Staircase had "a grandeur hard to parallel in 15th-century England." The apartments to the west of the staircase are more complex than the others, designed to create somewhat greater privacy, and overlooked the gardens to the west of the castle. On the south side of the court is the South Gate, the original entrance to the castle prior to the 1460s reconstruction. The fan-vaulted gatehouse closely resembles the contemporary cloisters at Gloucester Cathedral, but by the 16th century had been converted to the entrance to the bowling green in the terrace beyond.

On the south-east side of the court were the 16th-century parlour on the first-floor, and the dining room above it—both 49 by 21 feet (14.9 by 6.4 m). These were intended to provide rooms that were more private than the main hall, but more public than a personal chamber. Now ruined, they would originally have been decorated with carved wainscoting and elaborate, carved chimney-pieces. Alongside these rooms, overlooking the Great Tower, were the private rooms for the lord's family, of higher quality than the other accommodation in the castle. Some of the carved badges and shields on the external walls of these state apartments still remain intact, as in the hall; these were a popular contemporary feature of 15th-century great castles, and would have created a similar effect to those at Warkworth Castle in Northumberland and Raby Castle in County Durham.

=== Great Tower ===
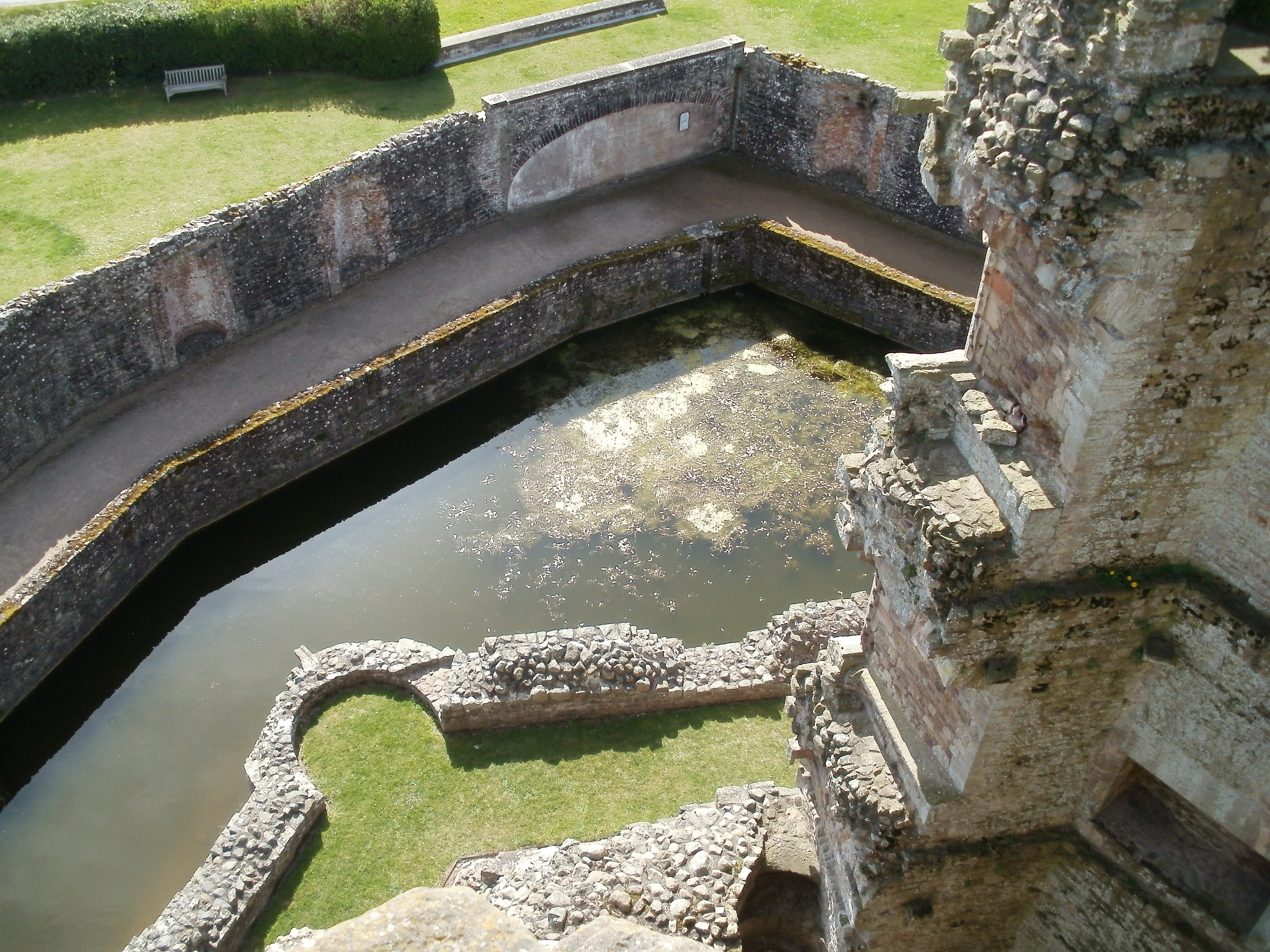
View from the top of the Great Tower, showing the thick walls, the remains of the apron wall and a turret, the moat, the moat walk and a space for a classical statue

The Great Tower at Raglan Castle, sometimes called the Yellow Tower of Gwent, sits outside the rest of the castle, protected by a moat and linked to the Fountain Court by a bridge. The fortification is representative of a trend during the 15th and 16th centuries in British castle building: tower keeps such as this, large, solid buildings designed for private accommodation, probably inspired by those in France, had started to appear in the 14th century at Dudley and Warkworth. In the 15th century the fashion spread, with the creation of French-influenced palatial castles featuring complex tower keeps, such as those at Wardour and Tattershall. These were expensive buildings to construct, each built to a unique design and, as historian Norman Pounds has suggested, "were designed to allow very rich men to live in luxury and splendour".

The hexagonal Great Tower was probably begun in the 1430s and 1440s, possibly on the motte of a previous castle. The tower today has lost not only one of its walls but part of its upper structure, and would originally have been three storeys high with probably additional machicolations on top similar to those on the gatehouse. It was designed to be a self-contained fortification, with its own water and food supplies, and luxurious quarters lit by large windows on the upper floors. Originally the tower was reached by a bascule drawbridge, usually considered to be drawn from contemporary French designs, such as those at Ferté-Milon and Vannes. This drawbridge was designed to have two parts—a wide, heavy bridge that would be raised or lowered when the family was in residence, and a thinner bridge, easier to lift, designed for the use of servants at other times. The Herberts used the bridge as their badge, and it can be seen in the carved window designs around the castle. The drawbridge was replaced with a grander stone bridge in the 1460s, probably at a cost of around £900 to £1000. (Note: See above note on comparison of 15th century and modern prices.) An apron wall with six turrets was also added around the tower at around the same time.

The original moat around the tower would have been a simple design, but it was redesigned in the 1460s to provide a walkway around the outside of the Great Tower. The niches in the walls of the walkway are of 17th-century origin, and would originally have held classical statues—the walkway would have provided a dignified way of admiring the Great Tower. It is likely that fish would have been bred in the moat.

=== Landscape and gardens ===
The former 16th- and 17th-century gardens of Raglan Castle are still visible in the form of several long terraces to the north of the castle, overlooking the lower ground beyond. First created in the second half of the 16th century, these terraces would originally have included a number of knot gardens, probably with Italianate sculpture and carved stone balustrades. The gardens at their peak would have probably resembled those at Nonsuch Palace, where the Somersets also had an interest as the royal keepers. The valley below retains some signs of the drainage ditches that once formed part of the water gardens that flooded the bottom of the site, although the original "water-parterre" to the north-west of the castle, another water garden in the south, and the extensive gardens around the south-west of the castle are now no longer visible. The castle's bowling green still survives, on a terrace just beyond the South Gate entrance. The castle's parks reverted to agricultural use by the 19th century, and Raglan is now surrounded by fields. The gardens and park at Raglan are designated Grade I on the Cadw/ICOMOS Register of Parks and Gardens of Special Historic Interest in Wales.

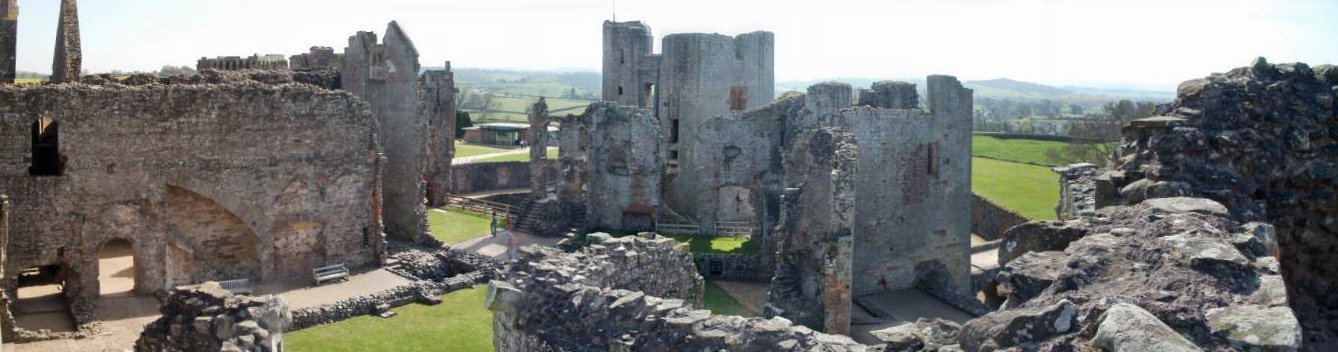
Panorama of the Fountain Court from the top of the Grand Stairs: left to right, the chapel and the Long Gallery; the ruins of the parlour and the dining room; the Great Tower and the moat; the apartments

== See also ==
- Castle Farmhouse, Raglan
- Castles in Great Britain and Ireland
- List of castles in Wales

== Bibliography ==
- Bradney, Joseph (1992) A History of Monmouthshire – The Hundred of Raglan.London: Academy Books. ISBN 1-873361-15-7.
- Clark, Arthur (1953) Raglan Castle and the Civil War in Monmouthshire. Newport: Chepstow Newport & Monmouthshire Branch of the Historical Association and Chepstow Society. OCLC 249172228
- Creighton, Oliver Hamilton and Robert Higham. (2003) Medieval Castles. Princes Risborough, UK: Shire Publications. ISBN 978-0-7478-0546-5.
- Durant, Horatia. (1980) Raglan Castle. Risca: Starling Press. ISBN 978-0-903434-41-6.
- Emery, Anthony. (1975) "The development of Raglan castle and keeps in late medieval England," Archaeological Journal 132, pp. 151–86.
- Emery, Anthony. (2006) Greater Medieval Houses of England and Wales, 1300–1500: Southern England. Cambridge: Cambridge University Press. ISBN 978-0-521-58132-5.
- Hainsworth, David Roger. (2008) Stewards, Lords and People: the Estate Steward and his World in Later Stuart England. Cambridge: Cambridge University Press. ISBN 978-0-521-05976-3.
- Kenyon, John R. (1987) "The gunloops at Raglan Castle, Gwent," in Kenyon and Avent (eds) (1987).
- Kenyon, John R. and R. Avent. (eds) (1987) Castles in Wales and the Marches. Cardiff: University of Wales Press. ISBN 978-0-7083-0948-3.
- Kenyon, John (2003) Raglan Castle. Cardiff, Wales: Cadw. ISBN 1-85760-169-6.
- King, D. J. Cathcart. (1991) The Castle in England and Wales: An Interpretative History. London: Routledge. ISBN 0-415-00350-4.
- Johnson, Matthew. (2002) Behind the castle gate: from Medieval to Renaissance. Abingdon, UK: Routledge. ISBN 978-0-415-25887-6.
- Liddiard, Robert. (2005) Castles in Context: Power, Symbolism and Landscape, 1066 to 1500. Macclesfield, UK: Windgather Press. ISBN 0-9545575-2-2.
- Newman, John. (2000) The Buildings of Wales: Gwent/Monmouthshire. London, UK: Penguin. ISBN 0-14-071053-1
- Pounds, Norman John Greville. (1994) The Medieval Castle in England and Wales: a social and political history. Cambridge: Cambridge University Press. ISBN 978-0-521-45828-3.
- Pugin, Augustus. (1895) Examples of Gothic architecture selected from various ancient edifices in England. Edinburgh: J. Grant. OCLC 31592053.
- Rakoczy, Lila (2007). Archaeology of Destruction: A Reinterpretation of Castle Slightings in the English Civil War (PhD). University of York.
- Smith, Chris E. (2009). "Excavations at Raglan Castle, Monmouthshire, 2003-07". Archaeologia Cambrensis. 156: 123–139. doi:10.5284/1059186.
- Strong, Roy. C. (1977) The Cult of Elizabeth: Elizabethan portraiture and pageantry. Berkeley: University of California Press. ISBN 978-0-520-05841-5.
- Taylor, Christopher. (1998) Parks and Gardens of Britain: a Landscape History from the Air. Edinburgh: Edinburgh University Press. ISBN 978-1-85331-207-6.
- Tribe, Anna. (2002) : Raglan Castle and the Civil War. Caerleon: Monmouthshire Antiquarian Association.
- Whittle, E. (1989) "The Renaissance gardens of Raglan Castle," Garden History 17 (1), pp. 83–94.
- Whittle, E. (1990) "The 16th and 17th century gardens at Raglan Castle," Monmouthshire Antiquity 6, pp. 69–75.
