= Raglan Library =

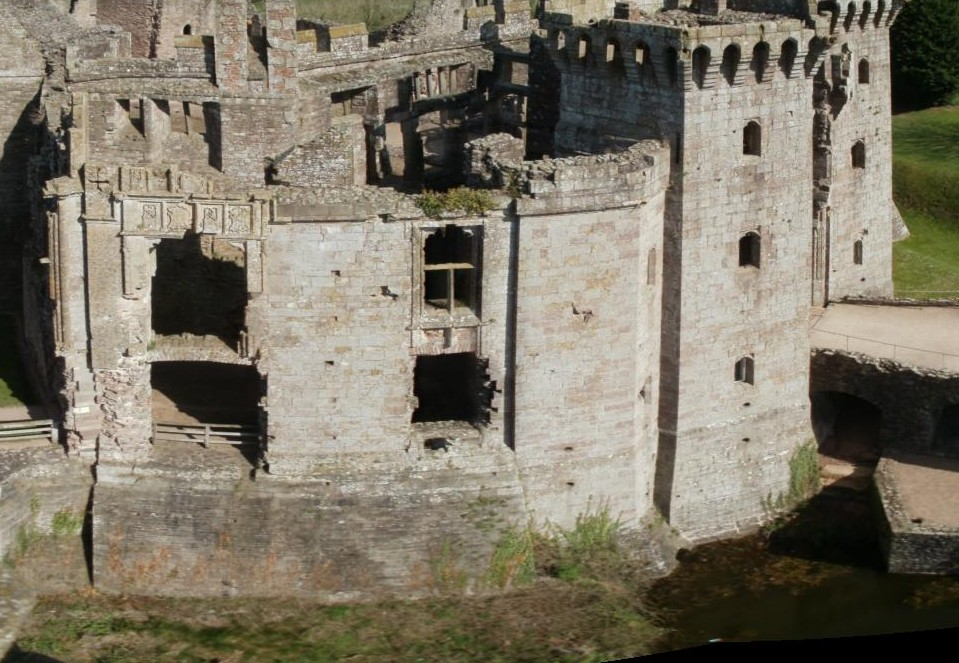
The castle's state apartments (left), library (centre) and gatehouse (right)

Raglan Library was a library located in Raglan Castle in the county of Monmouthshire in south east Wales.

The library contained one of the most extensive collections of ancient Welsh manuscripts in history. This included works by Dafydd ap Gwilym, Taliesin, Rhys Goch, Jonas of Menevia, Ederyn the Golden-tongued, Einion the Priest, Cwtta Cyvarwydd, Siôn Cent and Dafydd Ddu o Hiraddug amongst others.

It was destroyed and looted by parliamentarian forces under Oliver Cromwell in August 1646, during the English Civil War. The destruction of Raglan Library was described as an "irrepairable [sic] loss to the literature of Wales".
