= Castle Farmhouse, Raglan =

Castle Farmhouse, Raglan.
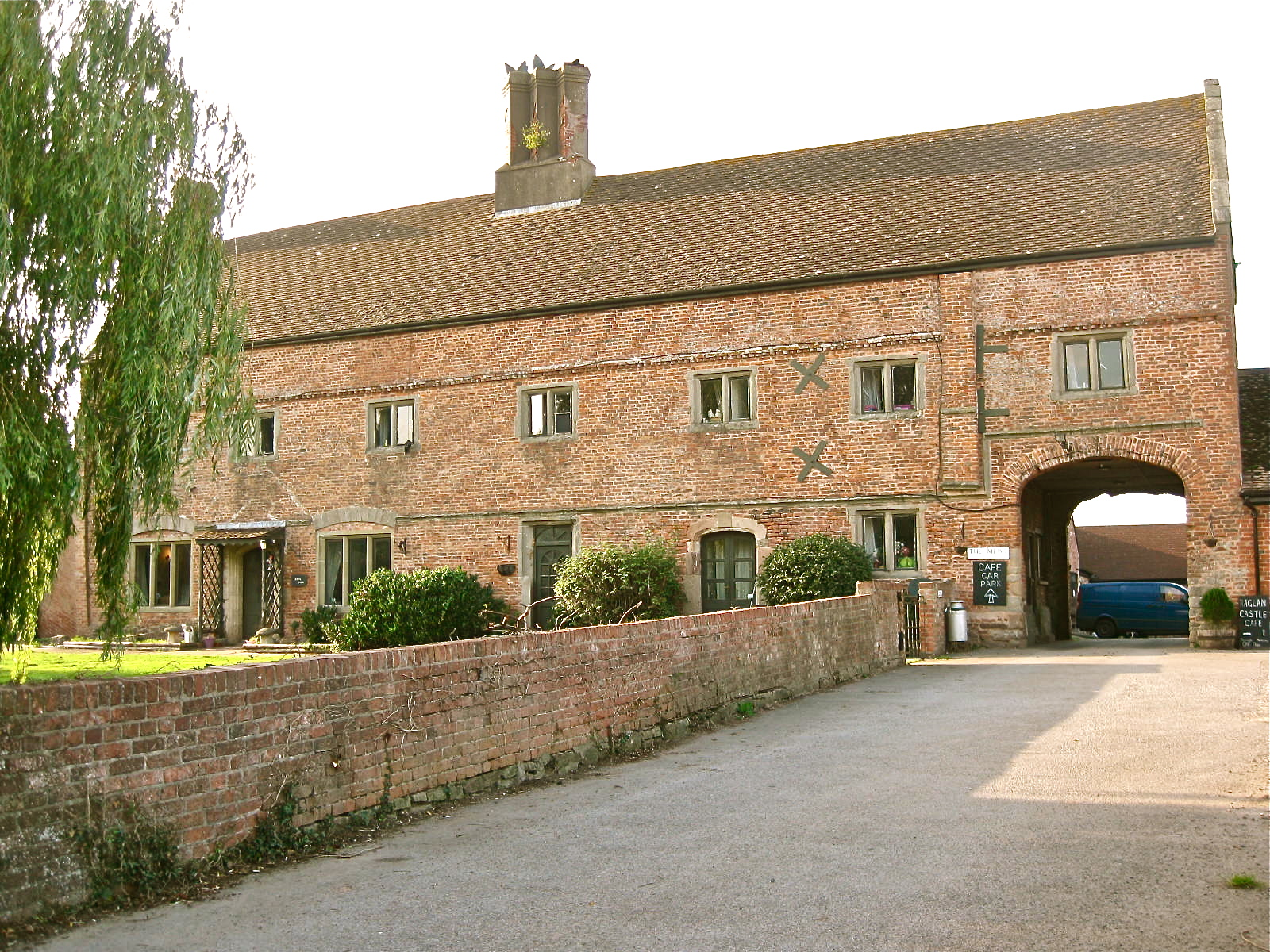
- Approach to the farm building

- Location in Monmouthshire
- 51.7701°N 2.8472°W
- Location: Raglan, Monmouthshire, Wales

History
- Built: Mid-17th Century

Site notes
- Architectural style: 17th Brick building

Listed Building – Grade II
- Designated: 19 April 1982
- Reference no.: 2758

Castle Farm, Raglan, in the county of Monmouth, is prominently sited 100 yards (91 m) east of Raglan Castle. The farm is approached from its own drive and shielded from close public view. It was built just before the English Civil War, probably around 1630 and is one of the earliest brick buildings in South Wales. It was originally a stable-block for the castle and later became a farm with a farm courtyard. Some of the farm buildings have been converted into a cafe which serves visitors to the castle. The building is a Grade II listed building and may have been built for the 5th Earl of Worcester to serve Raglan Castle.

== History and architecture ==
The farm is a remarkable, early example of brick architecture in Monmouthshire, although some brick had been used in the building and lining the walls of the Raglan Castle from about 1460 onwards. The long-demolished Red Gate of the castle, under construction in the 1640s, was built entirely of brick. The Herberts also used brick for the New Build of 1624 at Montgomery Castle.

The main building of the farmhouse consists of seven bays of red brick with stone dressings and window mullions. In 1674 it was described as stables and barns lately built, like unto a small Town. Some of the stone window mullions may have been re-used from the castle. The brickwork is bonded irregularly, with a decorative course consisting of a serrated band of bricks laid at an angle. The triple chimney stack is also built of brick. At the survey in 1982 the house was recorded as retaining original floor beams and double-collared trusses, with queen posts.

== Gallery ==
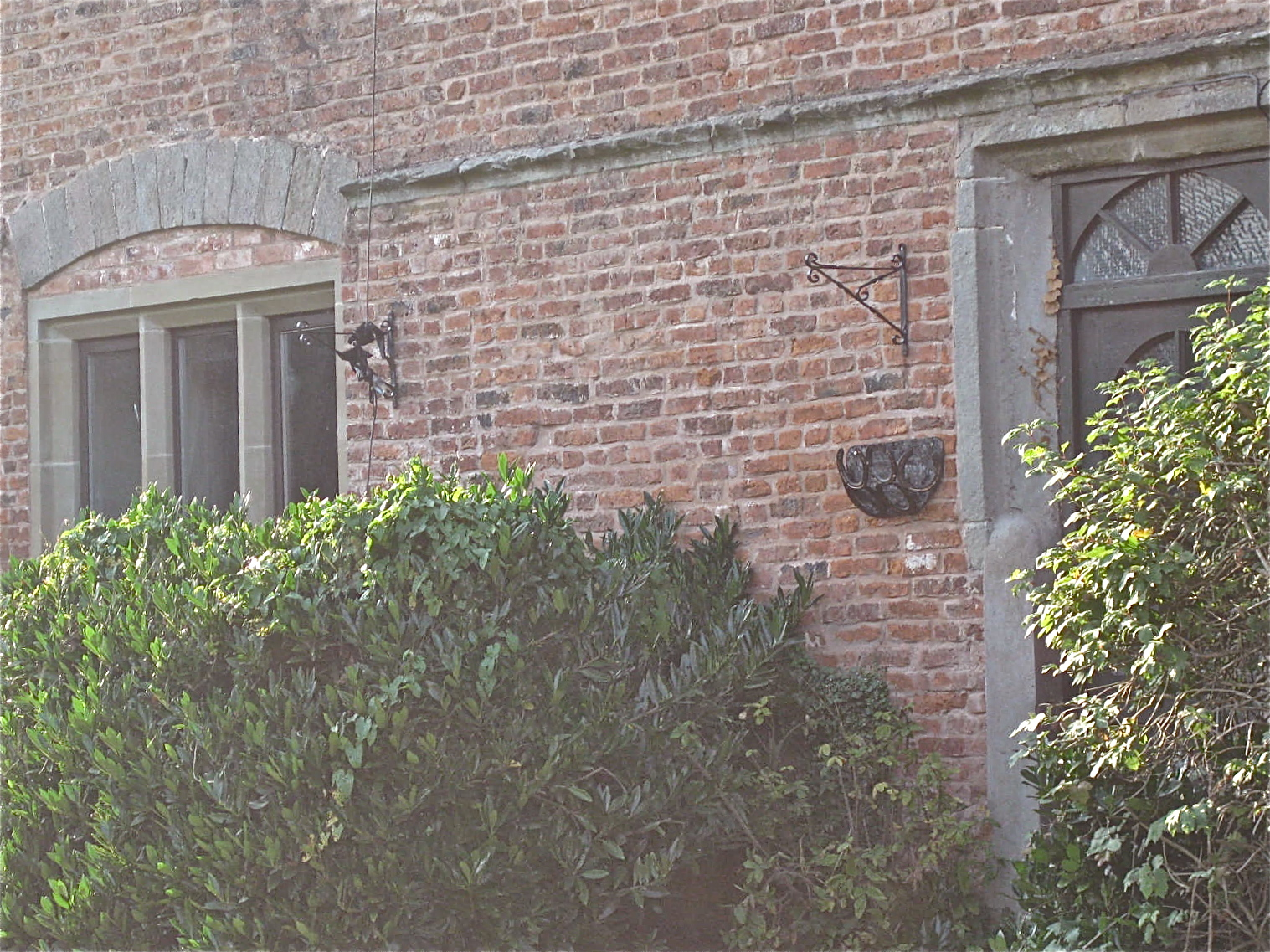
Detail of early brickwork

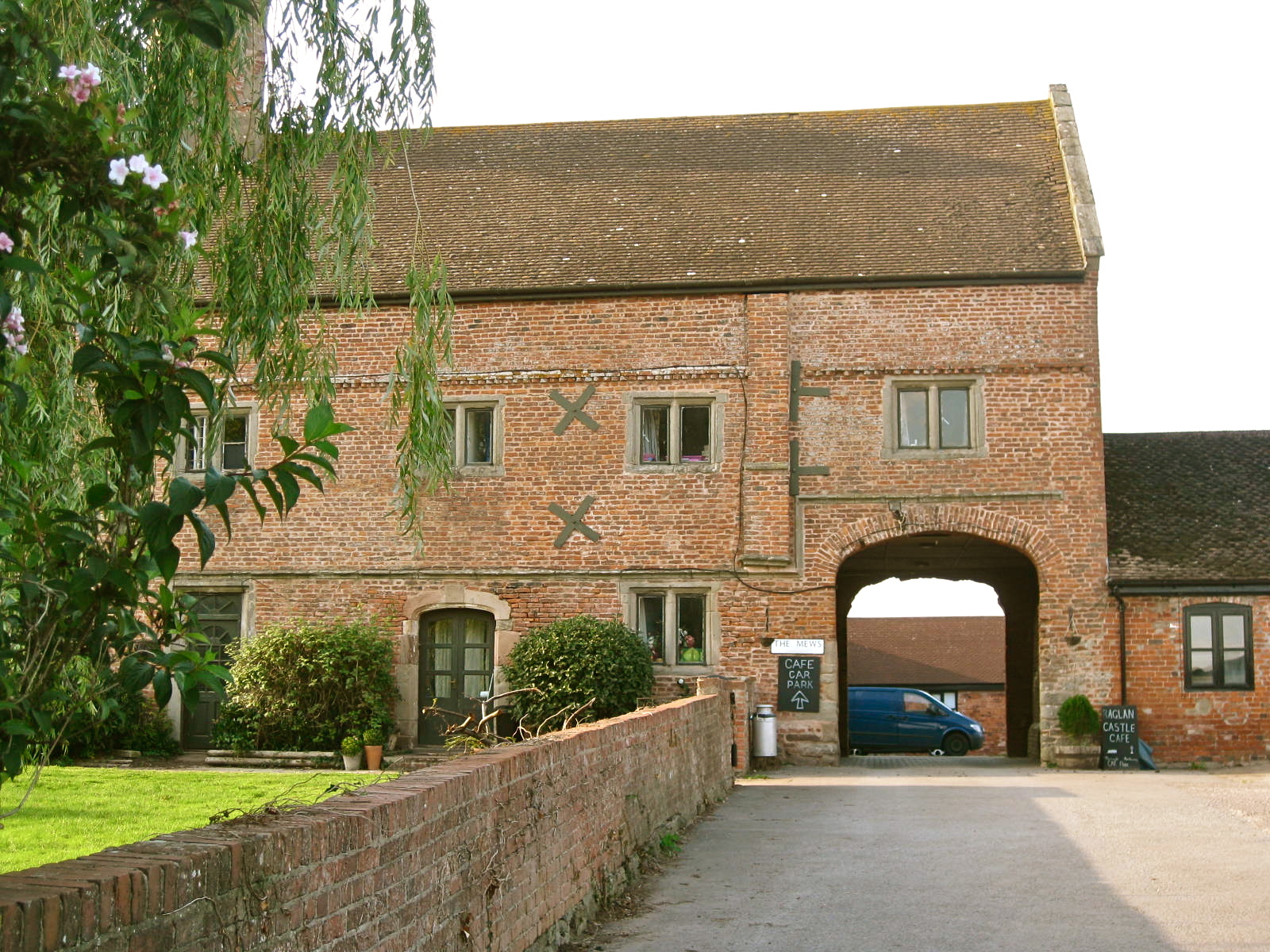
Entry arch

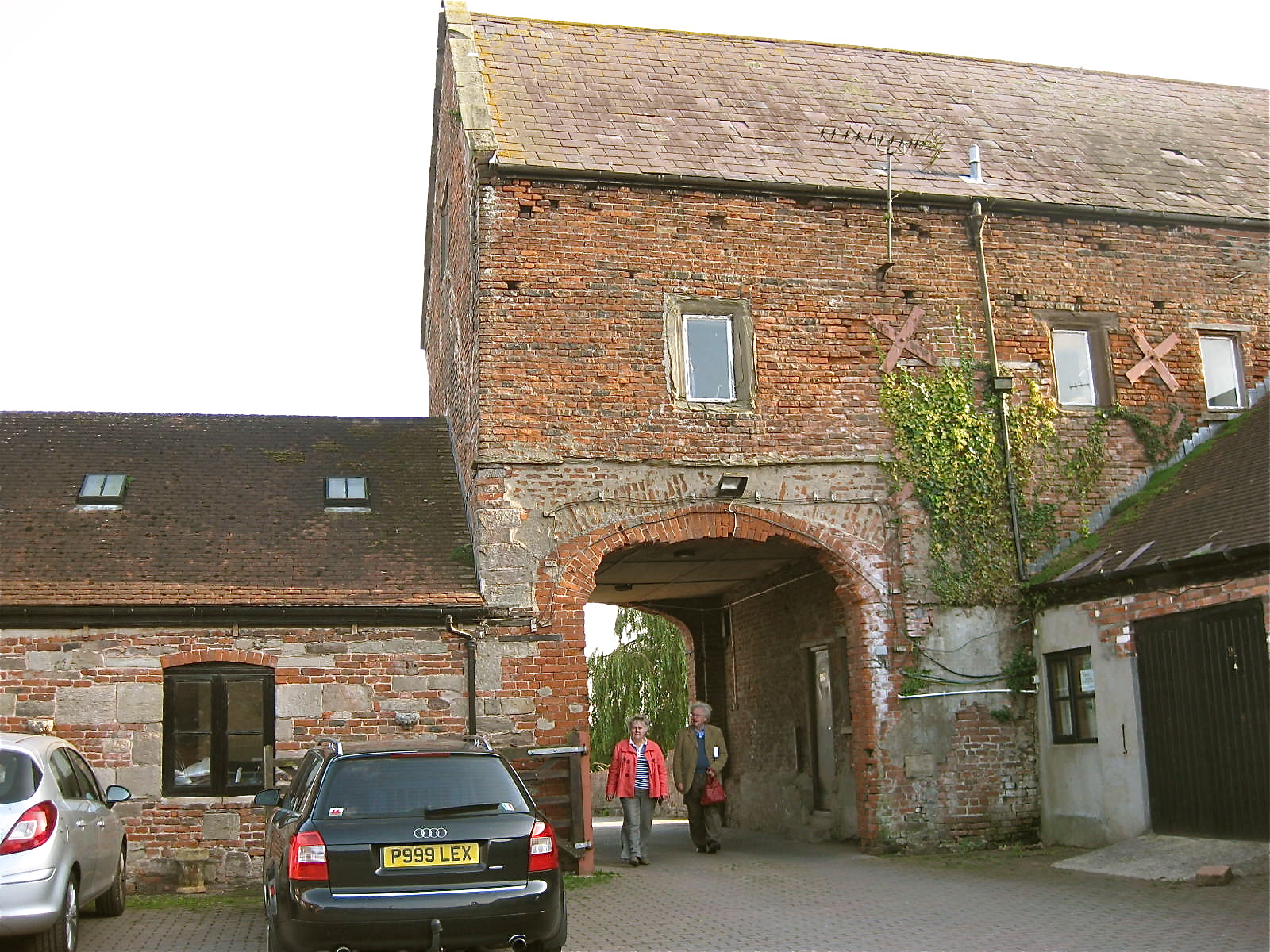
Arch from within courtyard

== Sources ==
- Fox, Sir Cyril and Lord Raglan (1954) Monmouthshire Houses, 1951–4, Vol 3, pp17n, 113, Plate 13d.
- Taylor, A.J. (1950), Raglan Castle (guidebook), p51.
- Jones, Sarah (2005), Raglan Castle: A landscape survey, CADW,. p17.
- Newman, John (2000). Gwent/Monmouthshire. The Buildings of Wales. London: Penguin. ISBN 0-14-071053-1.
