= Al-Awqaf Library =

Library in Iraq

The Al-Awqaf Library is a library located near the Iraq National Library and Archive. It held about 5,000 Islamic manuscripts. It was looted and burnt in the 2003 Iraq War.

== See also ==
- Destruction of libraries
