= WAQF Tower =

Highrise in Niamey, Niger

Coordinates: 13.5148°N 2.1071°E

WAQF Tower is a Highrise in Niamey, Niger, and is the country's tallest building, standing at 58.85 m (193.1 ft). Construction finished in 2019. The foundation was ceremonially laid by Niger's president Mahamadou Issoufou.
