= Philippa Roet =

English lady-in-waiting

- Born: Philippa de Roet c. 1346; England
- Died: c. 1387 (aged 40–41); England
- Occupation: Lady-in-waiting
- Spouse: Geoffrey Chaucer (m. 1366)
- Children: Elizabeth Chaucer; Thomas Chaucer
- Parent: Sir Gilles de Roet (father)
- Relatives: Katherine Swynford (sister)

Philippa de Roet (also known as Philippa Pan or Philippa Chaucer; c. 1346 – c. 1387) was an English courtier, the sister of Katherine Swynford (third wife of John of Gaunt, Duke of Lancaster – a son of King Edward III) and the wife of the poet Geoffrey Chaucer.

== Early life ==
Roet was the daughter of Sir Gilles de Roet, who was a herald and, later, a knight of Hainault and accompanied Queen Philippa to England. He later became the Guienne King of Arms. There is no history of her mother, but it is thought that Philippa had two sisters and a brother: Katherine, Elizabeth, and Walter. Her father went to serve the queen's sister, Marguerite, who was the empress of Germany and the three younger children – Walter, Philippa and Katherine – were left in the care of Queen Philippa.

It was her father's relationship with royalty that gave Philippa and her family high status and a reputation among the upper class, who took Philippa in as a 'domicella', or lady-in-waiting. This phase of her life began with the households of Elizabeth of Ulster and Queen Philippa, and ended with Constance of Castile, Duchess of Lancaster. These associations proved to be valuable, as Philippa began to receive annuities from Edward III, Richard II, and John of Gaunt, Costanza's husband.

Philippa is believed to have picked up the nickname "Philippa Pan" while working at Elizabeth of Ulster's household. There are records from 1357 to 1359 from the house of Elizabeth of Ulster which mention "a lady designated as Philippa Pan". "Pan" may have been an abbreviation of "Panetaria", meaning mistress of the pantry, which is most likely where Philippa worked in the Ulster household. The name might also come from her father, who sometimes went by 'Paon' or Payne.

== Marriage to Chaucer and adulthood ==
Geoffrey Chaucer was commissioned to work as a page in Elizabeth's household in 1357, where Philippa was already working as a domicella, caring for Elizabeth's infant daughter, Philippa of Eltham. This is where they are believed to have met; Philippa was around 10 years old at the time and Chaucer was said to be around 12. After Elizabeth's death, both were sent to work for the queen. Their marriage might have been arranged by Queen Philippa herself in September 1366. It was apparently tradition for domicellas and esquire who worked in the same household to marry.

Once married, although granddaughter Philippa of Eltham was grown, it was decided they would continue working for her and the king. As a result of this marriage, Queen Philippa and King Edward III granted a lifetime annuity to the couple in 1366. This payment allowed the Chaucers to set up a household within the royal one. Chaucer was then taken into the King's household in 1367 and began to receive his own annuity. These salaries gave the Chaucers great financial security and a good lifestyle. After the death of the queen, Philippa went to the service of Costanza of Castile and John of Gaunt, the Duke of Lancaster. Following Costanza's death in 1394, John wed his mistress, Katherine, who was Philippa's sister. This connection significantly increased the Chaucers' status in society. Philippa was much in favour in court as a lady-in-waiting and her husband continued to elevate his reputation. He worked as a Controller of Customs and royal agent. Due to the varying nature of their jobs, Chaucer and Philippa were often forced to spend much of their time apart. This may explain why very little is known about their marriage. Philippa Roet was somewhat higher born than her husband and consideration has been given to the parallels between their relationship and the one in Chaucer's "Franklin's Tale", which details the relationship between a lower-born knight and a higher-born lady.

== Children ==
It is probable that Chaucer and Philippa had "two sons and two daughters", whose birthdates are unknown. A lurid conspiracy theory was put forth, first by Mary Eliza Haweis in the late nineteenth-century, and then again more influentially by Russell Kraus in 1932, that "one or two" of these children had been illicitly fathered by John of Gaunt. Many scholars, including almost all modern Chaucerians have argued against this theory; H. A. Kelly, for example, has effectively demonstrated that this belief is likely false as John of Gaunt having sexual relations with two sisters would have been considered incest and would have required additional papal dispensation for him to marry Katherine. Samantha Katz Seal argues that literary critics deliberately encouraged the idea of a "harlot" Philippa for the same reason that earlier critics had believed in a "shrewish" Philippa, namely that alienating Chaucer from his wife and domestic circles allowed these critics to imagine a more masculine Chaucer, and to claim that they, his critics, understood Chaucer better than anyone else ever had, especially his wife.

Elizabeth is thought to be the eldest of their children. She is likely the Elizabeth Chaucer who, along with a Margaret Swynford, was nominated a nun by royal privilege at the accession of Richard II in 1377, thus she may have been born as early as 1364. She may have been a nun in Barking Abbey; there are records of an "Elizabeth Chausier" and her nickname being "Chaucy" which leads historians to believe that she was their daughter. It has been suggested that she was named after Elizabeth of Ulster, however it is worth remembering that Philippa had an elder sister, named Elizabeth/Isabel.

Thomas, the eldest son and most well known, might have been born around 1367 judging from the dates he entered the military; it has been suggested, primarily by Russell Kraus, that he was the son of John of Gaunt, whom he served under and received favours from; however, as stated previously, this parentage is unlikely. A strong relationship with Philippa has been suggested due to an assumption that Thomas chose to bear her coat of arms over Chaucer's. However, in the Special Collections of the Harvard Library is a deed with the name and seal of Thomas Chaucer using the arms of his father Geoffrey and there is no known example of Thomas Chaucer ever using a seal with the arms of his mother. Confusion over this has likely come about because the tomb of him and his wife, constructed by their daughter, Alice Chaucer, Duchess of Suffolk, uses Roet rather than Chaucer arms.

Very little is known of Lewis and Agnes, the second son and younger daughter. However, it is recorded that Lewis was born in 1381 and sent to the school at Oxford at age 10; it is also known that Chaucer's Treatise on the Astrolabe was written for Lewis. Agnes, who is believed to be his second daughter, was a lady-in-waiting at Henry IV's coronation in 1399.

== Death ==
Although there is no precise evidence, Philippa is thought to have died in 1387, due to her last recorded pension being on 18 June 1387. This is evidenced by Chaucer's last recorded overseas journey, which was in the same year. It is also suggested that he may have fallen out of favor with the court following her presumed death.

There is a tomb in the church of St Mary, East Worldham in Hampshire, that is thought to be Philippa's.
