= Paon de Roet =

British knight, father-in-law of Geoffery Chaucer

The coat of arms of Katherine de Roet

Paon de Roet (c. 1310 – 1380), also called Paon de Roët, Sir Payn Roelt, Payne Roet and sometimes Gilles Roet, was a herald and knight from Hainaut (in present-day Belgium) who was involved in the early stages of the Hundred Years' War. He became attached to the court of King Edward III of England through the king's marriage to Philippa of Hainaut.

He is most notable for the fact that he became the ancestor of the monarchs of England and of Scotland. The children of his daughter Katherine, mistress and later wife of the king's son John of Gaunt, were given the surname Beaufort and her great-granddaughter Margaret Beaufort gave rise to the Tudor dynasty while her granddaughter Joan Beaufort married into the Stuart dynasty. Another of his daughters, Philippa, also made a notable marriage to the poet Geoffrey Chaucer.

== Career ==
=== Early life ===
Born about 1310 in Hainaut, he was "probably christened as Gilles", in English 'Giles' and in Latin 'Egidius', a name used in each generation of the knightly family who were feudal lords of the town of Le Roeulx. However, he became known by the nickname Paon [peacock] or Payn, sometimes written in Latin as Paganus [pagan].

Paon/Payne de Roet is often assumed to have been a descendant of a collateral branch of the Lords of Roeulx, of Hainault. The traditional argument has been that Paon de Roet bore arms that were similar to those borne by the Hainault Lords of Roeulx, recorded by Rietstap as gu., a trios roués d'arg (while those of the modern town of Le Roeulx are a lion passant holding a single silver wheel [granted in 1822]). The heraldic usage of a wheel for Roet is an example of a canting or punning coat of arms in which the heraldic device is a play on the name of the individual bearing the device; in this case, a single silver wheel for Roet/Roeulx/Ruet/Roelt, from rota, the Latin word for "wheel". However, a problem with this argument of tying the family of Paon de Roet to a substantial Hainault patrimony is the finding of the Roeulx' of Hainault bearing not wheels for Roet but instead the comital lions of Hainault (d'or, à trois lions de gueules), for the family from whom they descended. Thus while Paon himself may well have borne a coat of arms consisting of one or three silver wheels on a field of gules, it remains uncertain whether this was done to distinguish his family as a collateral branch from the Lords of Roeulx or, perhaps more likely, to simply match with the family name and denote that he was from the same general area, where wheels were often featured on the heraldic flags.

Paon de Roet may have been inspired to seek his fortune in England by the example of Fastre de Roet, who accompanied John of Beaumont in 1326, when, with three hundred followers, he went to fight for the English against the Scots. Fastre was a younger brother of Eustace VI, last lord of Le Roeulx and a descendant of the Counts of Hainault. He and his brother Eustace, who fell into pecuniary straits, were obliged to alienate their landed possessions. Fastre, who died in 1331, was buried in the abbey church of Le Roeulx, while his brother Eustace survived till 1336.

=== In England ===
Paon de Roet may have come to England as part of the retinue of Philippa of Hainaut, accompanying the young queen in her departure from Valenciennes to join her youthful husband Edward III in England at the close of 1327. His name does not appear in the official list of knights who accompanied the queen from Hainaut. However, Froissart says he was one of a number of additional young knights and squires who added to the queen's retinue, referred to as 'pluissier jone esquier', i.e. "plusieurs jeunes escuyers" ('other young squires'); Speght (1598).

Froissart's account of the history of English monarchs includes a genealogical tree, the relevant part of which begins with Paon's name. He is described as "Paganus de Rouet Hannoniensis, aliter dictus Guien Rex Armorum" ("Paon de Rouet of Hainaut, also called Guyenne King of Arms"). The latter part refers to the title of King of Arms granted by Edward III to Roet for the territory of Guyenne (Aquitaine) which was controlled by Edward.

=== France and Hainaut ===
In 1347, Roet was sent to the Siege of Calais, and was one of two knights deputed by Queen Philippa to conduct out of town the citizens whom she had saved (the so-called Burghers of Calais).

He had returned to the lands of Hainaut, probably by 1349. He went to serve the queen's sister, Marguerite, who was the empress of Germany, and his three younger children—Walter, Philippa and Katherine—were left in the care of Queen Philippa. He died in Ghent, County of Flanders in 1380.

== Family ==
Paon had three daughters, Katherine, Philippa and Isabel (also called Elizabeth) de Roet, and a son, Walter. Isabel was to become Canoness of the convent of Saint Waltrude Collegiate Church at Mons in Hainaut, c. 1366. Philippa married the poet Geoffrey Chaucer in 1366. They met while still children when they were attached to the household of Elizabeth de Burgh, 4th Countess of Ulster.

Katherine became governess to the daughters of John of Gaunt. After the death of John's wife Blanche of Lancaster in 1369, Katherine and John began a love affair which would bring forth four children born out of wedlock and would endure as a lifelong relationship. However, John made a dynastic marriage to Constance of Castille, a claimant to the throne of Castile, after which he called himself "King of Castille". When Constance died he married Katherine and legitimized their children.

== Tomb ==
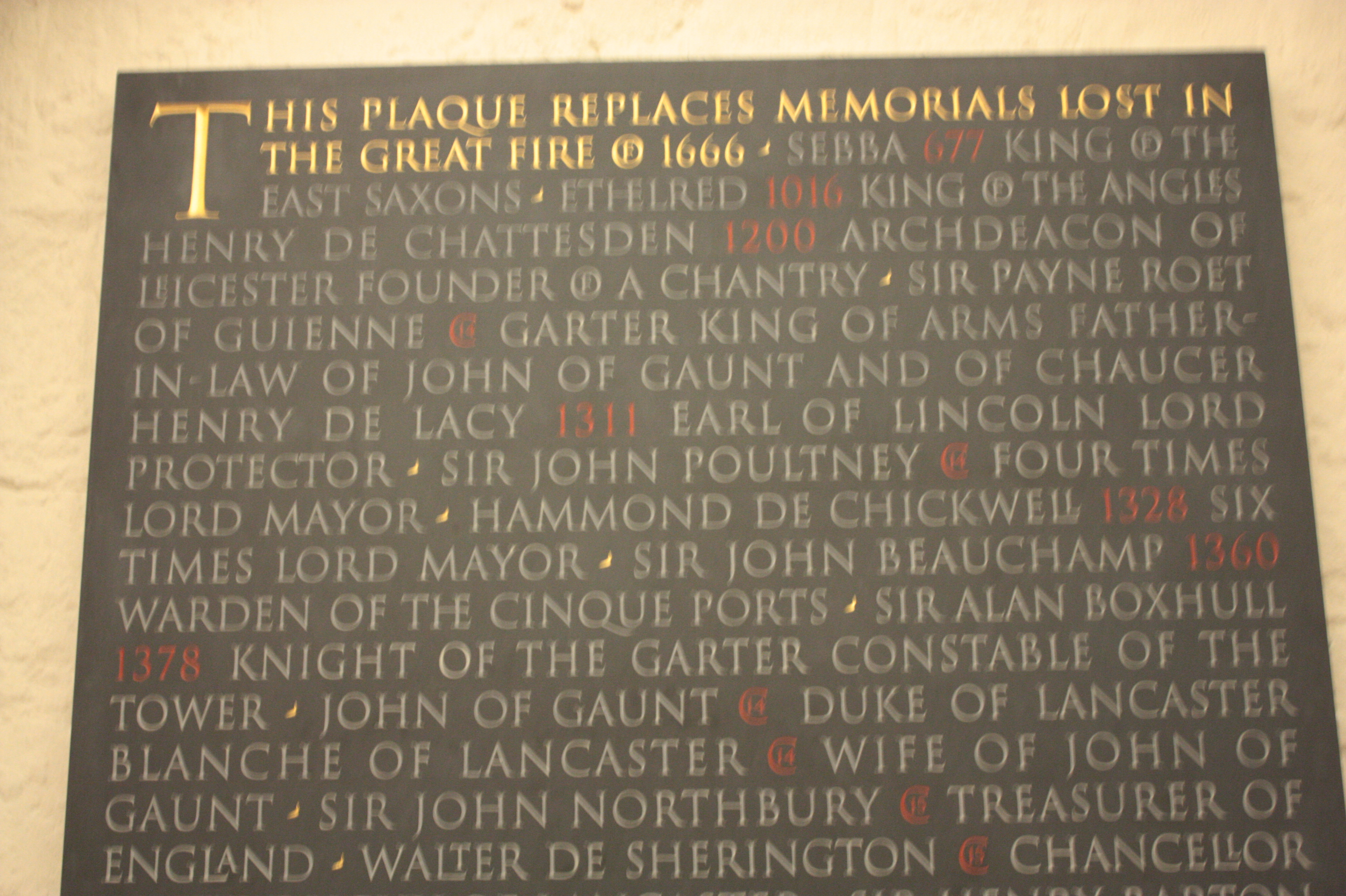
Roet's name listed amongst early graves lost noted on the memorial in St Paul's Cathedral

Paon de Roet's tomb was in Old St Paul's Cathedral, near Sir John Beauchamp's tomb (commonly called "Duke Humphrey's"). In 1631 the antiquary John Weever reported that "upon a faire marble stone, inlaid all over with brasse, (of all which, nothing but the heads of a few brazen nailes are at this day visible) and engraven with the representation and cote-Armes of the party defunct. Thus much of a mangled funerall Inscription was of late time perspicuous to be read".

By 1658, still without its brass plate and effigies, the tomb was again described by William Dugdale. It was destroyed, along with many others (including that of John of Gaunt and Blanche of Lancaster) in 1666 in the Great Fire of London. A modern monument in the crypt lists de Roet amongst the important graves lost.

The inscription (as recorded by Weever, although lost by his day) began:

Hic Jacet Paganus Roet miles Guyenne Rex Armorum Pater Catherine Ducisse Lancastrie ...
(Here lies Paon de Roet, knight, Guyenne King of Arms, father of Katherine Duchess of Lancaster ...)

Alison Weir argues that Katherine herself likely had the tomb made for her father during her lifetime, which would place its construction between 1396 and 1403.
