= Katherine Swynford =

Wife of John of Gaunt (c. 1349 – 1403)

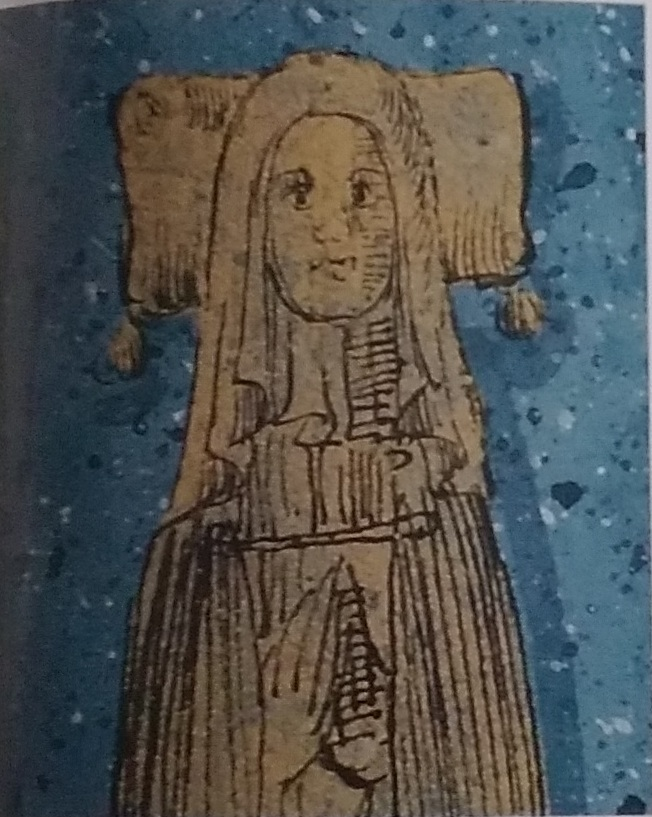
- Katherine Swynford, from her tomb

Duchess consort of Aquitaine
- Tenure: 13 January 1396 – 3 February 1399
- Born: Katherine de Roet c. 1349; County of Hainaut (possibly)
- Died: 10 May 1403 (aged 52–53); Lincoln, Lincolnshire, Kingdom of England
- Burial: Lincoln Cathedral
- Spouse: Hugh Swynford (m. 1362; died 1371) John of Gaunt (m. 1396; died 1399)
- Issue: Blanche Swynford; Margaret Swynford (?); Dorothy Swynford (?); Thomas Swynford; John Beaufort, 1st Earl of Somerset; Cardinal Henry Beaufort; Joan Beaufort, Countess of Westmorland; Thomas Beaufort, Duke of Exeter
- House: Lancaster (by marriage)
- Father: Payne de Roet

Katherine, Duchess of Lancaster (born Katherine de Roet, c. 1349 – 10 May 1403) was the third wife of John of Gaunt, Duke of Lancaster, the fourth (but third surviving) son of King Edward III. From her earlier marriage, she is known as Katherine Swynford.

Daughter of a knight from Hainaut, Katherine, whose name is also spelled "Katharine" or "Catherine", was brought up at the English royal court, later found herself in the service of Blanche of Lancaster, the first wife of John of Gaunt. At that time, she was married to Hugh Swynford (or de Swynford), one of the Duke's knights. After the death of the Duchess, Katherine became the lady-in-waiting of her daughters, and also took care of them.

After the death of Hugh Swynford, she became a member of the household of the Duke's new wife, Constance of Castile, and she was given management of the estates of her deceased husband in Lincolnshire: Coleby and Kettlethorpe. She soon became the mistress of John of Gaunt. From this connection, at least four children were born, who received the surname Beaufort after one of their father's French estates. Those four children were later legitimized by the Church, as the result of their parents' eventual marriage.

In addition, Gaunt gave his mistress several estates, and also provided her with a generous allowance. Since the relationship between Katherine and John of Gaunt caused public condemnation, in 1381 the Duke was forced to break their relationship. Katherine then settled in a rented house in Lincoln.

Despite the formal break, Katherine's relationship with her former lover and the rest of his family continued to be quite cordial. In 1387, she was made a Lady of the Garter by King Richard II, and shortly thereafter she became a member of the household of Mary de Bohun, wife of Henry Bolingbroke, eldest son and heir of John of Gaunt, who later became King of England under the name of Henry IV.

In the early 1390s, the love affair between Katherine and John of Gaunt resumed, and after the death of his second wife, the Duke unexpectedly married his mistress in 1396, which caused discontent among the English nobility. However, in the same year, a papal bull was received, recognizing the marriage as valid, and all the children born from the connection were legitimised. After the death of the Duke in 1399, Katherine retired to her rented house in Lincoln, where she died four years later. She was buried at Lincoln Cathedral.

Katherine and John of Gaunt's descendants, the Beaufort family, played a major role in the Wars of the Roses. Henry VII, who became King of England in 1485, derived his claim to the throne from his mother, Margaret Beaufort, who was a great-granddaughter of Gaunt and Swynford. His legal claim to the throne, therefore, was through a cognatic and previously illegitimate line. Henry VII's first action was to declare himself king "by right of conquest" retroactively from 21 August 1485, the day before his army defeated King Richard III at the Battle of Bosworth.

Through her son, John Beaufort, 1st Earl of Somerset, and her daughter, Joan Beaufort, Countess of Westmorland, Katherine became the ancestor of all English (and later British) monarchs since Edward IV.

== Family ==
Coat of arms of Le Roeulx family.

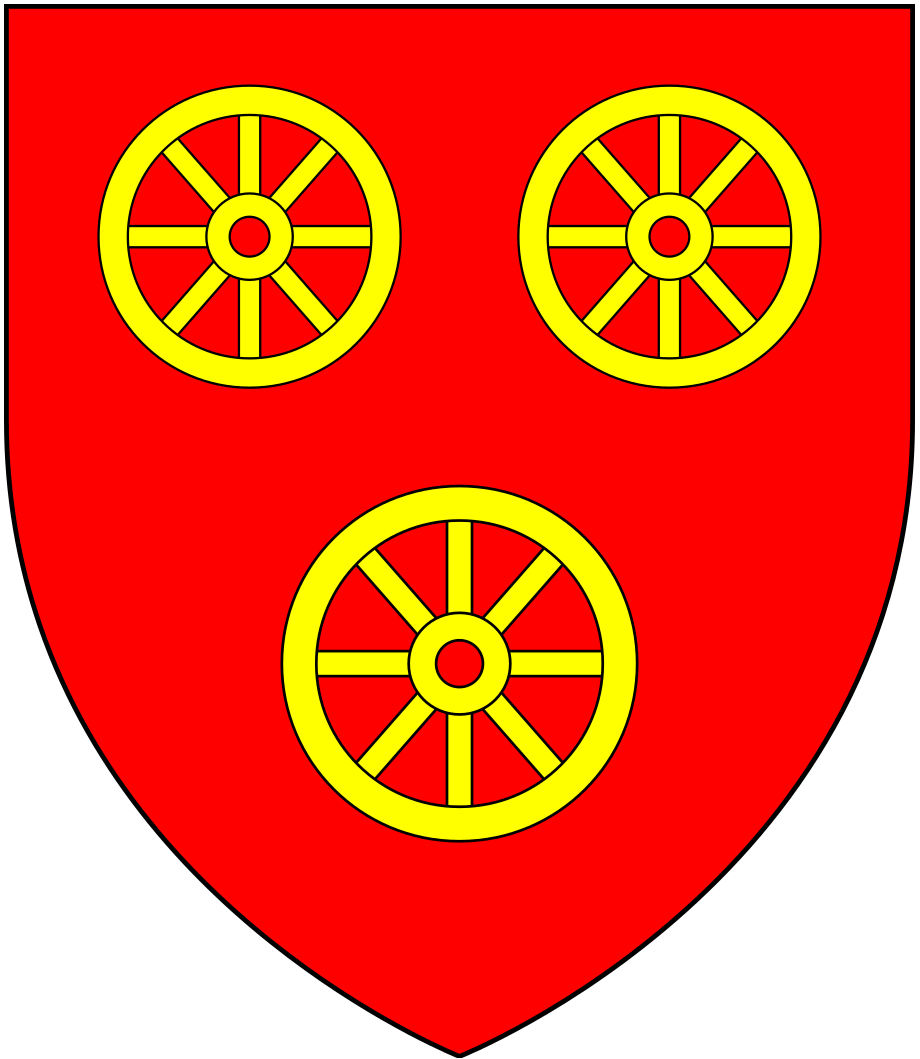
Coat of arms of Paon de Roet and his daughter Katherine Swynford, bef. 1396.

Katherine's father was Paon de Roet, a herald and, later, knight (who was "probably christened as Gilles"), who came to England in the entourage of Philippa of Hainaut, who married King Edward III. His origin is not documented. Payne's family nickname was Roe (French: Roët). On this basis, it has been suggested that he was related to the powerful family of the Lords of Le Roeulx, who owned a lordship in the County of Hainaut, whose name was spelled differently: Rouet, Roëlt, Ruet. The origin of this genus has been traced back to Charlemagne. Their possessions were mainly concentrated around the city of Le Rœulx, located 8 miles northeast of Mons. They also included the towns of Roux (located 40 miles east of Mons) and Faurœulx (20 miles south). However, according to the historian Alison Weir, there is reason to doubt this version of Paon's origin: the chronicler Jean Froissart, who himself was from Hainaut, was most likely well aware of his origin, but does not write anything about his nobility. As Paon's father, he points to a certain Jean de Roët (died 1305), son of Huon de Roët. Froissart gives no titles for any of them. At the same time, Weir notes that this version cannot be completely discarded: Paon de Roet could indeed come from a younger line of the Le Roeulx family, since the spelling of the generic names Roeulx and Roët are quite similar and they could well be interchangeable. In addition, the name Gilles, which Paon received at baptism, was quite common in the family of the Lords of Le Roeulx.

Additional evidence of the possible relationship of Paon de Roet with the Lords of Le Roeulx is the heraldic similarity of the coats of arms of Paon and the Le Roeulx family. The coat of arms of the city of Le Rœulx is a golden lion on a green field with a wheel in its paw, which is a play on words: in French, roue means wheel. The same theme was adopted by Paon's family: the coat of arms of his daughter, Katherine Swynford, was three gold wheels on a red field, however, judging by the heraldic emblems on the vestments given to her by Lincoln Cathedral, on her coat of arms until 1396, when she married John of Gaunt, there were three simple silver wheels; she probably inherited this coat of arms from her father.

Based on the description of his epitaph, Paon was King of Arms of Aquitaine for a time. In England, he was in the service of Queen Philippa. After the outbreak of the Hundred Years' War in 1340, he took part in the early stages of the English army, including fighting at the Battle of Crécy and the siege of Calais. Not later than 1349, Paon returned to Hainaut, where he served Countess Margaret II of Hainaut, sister of Queen Philippa.

There is no reliable information regarding Katherine's mother. According to some reports, Paon de Roet was married twice. It has been suggested that one of his wives was a relative of Queen Philippa, but there is no documentary evidence for this version. (Note: On some sites, Catherine of Avesnes, sister of Count William I of Hainaut, Queen Philippa's father, is listed as the mother of Katherine Swynford. However, this version has two problems. The first is due to the fact that the name Catherine is not found among the names of the known sisters of Count William I. The second problem is chronological: William I's father, John II, Count of Hainaut and Holland, died in 1304, so Catherine of Avesnes, born before 1304, could not be the mother of Katherine Swynford, who was born around 1350. There is another version, according to which Katherine Swynford's mother was not a sister, but the daughter of Count William I and, thus, the sister of Queen Philippa. However, in such a case, Katherine Swynford would have been John of Gaunt's first cousin, so chroniclers would have to note this fact when describing their love affair. In addition, their marriage would require special papal permission, but John of Gaunt does not mention such an obstacle. In addition, among the daughters of Count William I, a daughter named Catherine is also not mentioned.) Alison Weir believes that two children were born from Paon's first wife: the eldest daughter, Isabel (also called Elizabeth) —who later became in the Noble canoness of the very influential Saint Waltrude Collegiate Church in Mons (which, according to Weir, is evidence of Paon's close connection with the ruling family of Hainaut)—, and a son, Walter. The mother of Katherine and another daughter, Philippa (who married the famous English poet Geoffrey Chaucer), was, according to Weir, Paon's second wife.

== Life ==
=== Birth and early years ===
Katherine's year of birth is not documented. In 1631, John Weever claimed that she was the eldest of Paon de Roet's daughters, but that would make her at least 28 years old at the time of her first marriage, which is much older than the typical age girls married. Alison Weir believes that Weever did not know about the existence of Elizabeth de Roet and the other two daughters. The author of the article of Katherine Swynford in the Oxford Dictionary of National Biography believes that she was born around 1350, with which Weir agrees. They calculate the possible year of her birth based on the fact that Katherine married for the first time around 1362/1363 and gave birth to her first child around 1363/1364, and the canonical age at which a girl could marry and have marital relations with her husband, in that time was 12 years old. Weir further clarifies that Katherine was most likely born in 1349. She was probably named after St. Catherine of Alexandria whose cult at that time was gaining strength.

Katherine's birthplace is sometimes called Picardy, with which Alison Weir does not agree. This error, in her opinion, arises from the fact that some historians confuse Philippa de Roet, Katherine's sister, who was in the service of Queen Philippa, with certain Philippa Picard, but these are completely different personalities. (Note: Philippa Picard also served Queen Philippa. Her father may have been Henry Picard, Lord Mayor of London in 1356. Alison Weir points out that both Philippa Chaucer and Philippa Picard are mentioned in the Queen's last surviving royal document of 10 March 1369.) Katherine was probably born in the County of Hainaut, as indicated by the account of the chronicler Jean Froissart, who calls her a "resident" from there, and the chronicler Henry Knighton, who calls her "a certain foreigner". It is possible that Katherine's birthplace was her father's possessions, located near Mons.

In 1351, her father was in the service of Margaret II, Countess of Hainaut, whose position was rather precarious. In 1350 she renounced her claims to the Counties of Holland and Zeeland in favor of her second son, William, hoping to keep Hainaut under her rule. However, in the spring of 1351, William also captured Hainaut, Margaret II's supporters were expelled, their castles were destroyed, and their positions were transferred to others. In December, Margaret II, hoping to enlist the support of her brother-in-law King Edward III, fled to England, among others Paon de Roet accompanied her. Given the uncertainty in Hainaut, he probably took his entire family with him —his wife (if she was still alive) and children, except for Elizabeth, who remained in her abbey.

Soon Margaret II agreed with her son. Under the terms of the agreement, Hainaut was returned to her. William himself arrived in England at the beginning of 1352, where he married Maud of Lancaster, a close relative of King Edward III. In March, Margaret II returned to Hainaut, accompanied by Paon de Roet. However, after August 1352, his references completely disappear from contemporary sources. Alison Weir believes that he died in early 1355, since it was then that his son Walter moved from the service of the Countess of Hainaut to the service of Edward the Black Prince, the eldest son and heir of King Edward III and Queen Philippa of Hainaut.

Paon de Roet's daughters probably remained in England in the care of Queen Philippa, a "noble and kind woman", who at that time was over 40 years old. She herself was the mother of 12 children, the youngest of which, Thomas of Woodstock, was born in 1355. In addition, she had several other children from noble families in her upbringing. The Queen was interested in literature and art, was engaged in charity work, "she was a generous, kind, wise and humbly pious lady". Although many young girls were often sent to monasteries for education and training in good behavior and domestic skills, there is no evidence that Katherine was ever in a monastery. Her upbringing at the royal court is confirmed by Jean Froissart's report, which indicates that she was brought up at princely courts from her youth, as well as a reference in John of Gaunt's register to Katherine's nurse named Agnes Bonsergent, who was most likely appointed by the Queen to care for the young girl. At the same time, the Queen knew Dutch and Anglo-Norman language, which was the official language of the English court at this time. It soon began to be supplanted by English, which began to be used at court in 1362, and in the English Parliament in 1363, and literary works began to be created in it. However, the Norman dialect of French continued to be used by the English nobility in everyday life and for letters until the beginning of the 15th century. Apparently, Katherine also learned English, since she was the mistress of the Kettlethorpe estate for a long time, and the husband of her sister Philippa was Geoffrey Chaucer, who wrote his works in English.

The older children of King Edward III and Queen Philippa were much older than Katherine, but she was probably brought up with their younger children, Mary and Margaret. Jean Froissart reports that Katherine's tutor in her youth was Blanche of Lancaster, a close relative of the King and the bride of his third surviving son, John of Gaunt. At the same time, Blanche herself was brought up by Queen Philippa and was about 8 years older than Katherine. There is evidence that Katherine and Blanche of Lancaster were close friends. Apparently, the girl received a very good education, as evidenced by the fact that at the age of about 23 she was entrusted with the care of the daughters of Blanche of Lancaster, who grew up as highly cultured and educated girls. Although Katherine by origin did not belong to the highest nobility, her upbringing at the royal court opened up great prospects for her. In addition, probably through her upbringing, she acquired a certain piety and housekeeping skills, which in the future helped her effectively manage the knightly estates that were transferred to her. Also, she may have learned from the queen to be generous and diplomatic, which would come in handy later. Froissart reports that Katherine from her youth "knew court etiquette perfectly", in addition, she was a fairly skilled rider, as evidenced by the fact that she kept a dozen of her horses in the stables of John of Gaunt, and also once accompanied him during a horse ride on his estates. Since her daughter, Joan Beaufort, and both daughters of Blanche of Lancaster, whom she raised, were literate, it seems that Katherine was literate and could read and possibly write.

=== First marriage ===
In the 1360s, Katherine was in the service of Blanche of Lancaster, who by that time had become the wife of John of Gaunt. Jean Froissart mentions that Katherine was in the service of Blanche's family in her youth, but does not mention how old she was then. Gaunt's wife had her own household, independent of her husband, which had its own staff of officers, servants and ladies. The first record of Katherine in this new capacity dates to 24 January 1365, when she is mentioned as a servant. However, John of Gaunt's journals for an earlier period have not been preserved, and it is possible that her employment began at an earlier date. Blanche gave birth to her first daughter in March 1360, and she lived in the household of her mother-in-law, queen Phillipa, during her pregnancy. It is possible that Queen Philippa transferred Katherine to the service of Blanche at this time, and she probably accompanied Blanche to Leicester Castle for the confinement. Katherine's duties would have been to help care for the newborn, possibly to rock the baby. Such work was often entrusted to young girls of the age of Katherine, who at that time was about 10 years old.

At this time, Katherine herself married. This early marriage was probably arranged by John of Gaunt himself at the behest of his wife. Her first husband, Sir Hugh Swynford, descendant from an ancient English family, was a professional soldier and a tenant of the Duke of Lancaster. At first, he served Edward the Black Prince, who probably knighted him. In 1361, he moved to the service of John of Gaunt, in the same year inheriting his ancestral domains after the death of his father. For a long time, it was believed that the marriage was concluded around 1366–1367; however, Alison Weir does not agree with this. Weir posits that Katherine's eldest daughter in 1368 was old enough to be placed in the chambers of the daughters of the Duke of Lancaster. In addition, there are indications that another daughter was born in this marriage, who became a nun in 1377, and the earliest age at which this is possible was 13–14 years. On this basis, Weir considers that the marriage took place in 1361 or 1362. Katherine was definitely married by 24 January 1365 when, in the register of the Bishop of Lincoln, John Bokyngham, she is referred to as "Katherine Swynford". The marriage may have been celebrated in one of the Duke of Lancaster's residences, possibly the chapel of Savoy Palace.

Although some researchers wrote that Katherine got married in an old aristocratic house, this is not true. Despite the fact that the Swynford family were quite an ancient and branched family, whose representatives had possessions in Lincolnshire, Northamptonshire, Huntingdonshire, Essex and Suffolk, they were not aristocrats, but ordinary landowners, and never rose above the knightly rank. Hugh was not particularly rich, he owned only two estates in Lincolnshire — Coleby and Kettlethorpe, and none of them were profitable enough, and they were acquired by his father relatively recently. His main income came from the salary for his service with the Duke of Lancaster.

Hugh lived mainly on the estate of Kettlethorpe, (Note: According to legend, the estate of Kettlethorpe was founded in the 9th century by a Viking named Ketil, after whom it was named. However, it is not mentioned in the Domesday Book, for the first time this name is only found in 1220. Not later than 1287 it was owned by the Croy family, and in 1357 it was bought by Thomas Swynford, Hugh's father. At the moment, Kettlethorpe Hall has been built in its place, in which some fragments of a medieval house have been preserved.) located 12 miles west of Lincoln, that became the main residence of Katherine for many subsequent years. For 40 years she was called "Lady Kettlethorpe". The size of the estate was about 3,000 acres, most of which fell on the forest. It also included the villages of Lauterton, Newton-on-Trent and Fenton. Another Swynford estate, Colby, (Note: Colby Manor was established during the Danelaw. In the Domesday Book in 1086, it is listed as the property of the crown. In 1345 it was bought by Thomas Swynford, Hugh's father. One part of it was rented from the crown, and the second from the Earl of Richmond. The medieval house has not being preserved.) located seven miles south of Lincoln, was divided into two equal parts, each of which was about 90 acres of land and 15 acres of pasture. In 1367, the southern part of the estate generated an income of 54 shillings and 4d, with the rent paid to John of Gaunt as Earl of Richmond being 2 shillings. The other part of it belonged to the King and made up half of the knight's fief. In 1361, it did not bring much income, since the land was barren, and the dovecote and mill lay in ruins; its cost was 37 shillings and 10 pence —a third of the amount once paid by Hugh's father for its purchase.

Although Hugh Swynford was quite poor, he was able to receive a knighthood and provide his wife with a social position. It is not known how happy the marriage was, although, according to Alison Weir, it is unlikely that Katherine experienced warm or lasting feelings for her husband, due to her later connection with John of Gaunt. Hugh Swynford was often absent, participating in various military campaigns. When she married, Katherine became quite active in managing the estate of Kettlethorpe.

From her marriage, Katherine gave birth to several children. The eldest was probably a daughter, Blanche. In 1368 she was old enough to be placed in the chambers of the daughters of John of Gaunt, probably as a playmate. Alison Weir dates her birth to 1363. The origin of Blanche was recorded in 1396 by John of Gaunt, who, submitting a petition to the Pope for permission to marry Katherine, indicated that he was the godfather of her daughter, “born from another man”, (Note: This was one of the canonical obstacles to marriage, so special papal dispensation must be required.) adding that he did not advertise this fact. Some researchers have suggested that the Duke was the real father of Katherine's daughter, and this was why he kept the fact that he was the godfather a secret. However, Weir pointed out that the real father could not be the godfather for his own daughter. At the same time, John of Gaunt himself directly indicated that he was not her father, and it is unlikely that he would lie to the Pope, putting himself at risk. Considering that he recognized four children born by Katherine from their love affair without any problems, there was no problem for him to recognize another daughter. Therefore, the father of the indicated daughter (by whom, apparently, Blanche was meant) was precisely Hugh Swynford. The girl was probably named after the Duke's wife; she later enjoyed the patronage of Gaunt: in 1375 he granted Katherine custody of the heir Sir Robert Deincourt, who was betrothed to Blanche. Weir also suggested that Duchess Blanche herself could have been the godmother of Katherine's daughter, which is why the girl could have been placed in her daughters' chambers.

The next daughter, Margaret, was born about 1364, and in 1377 she became a nun at Barking Abbey. (Note: There is no documentary evidence that Margaret Swynford was the daughter of Hugh and Katherine, but Alison Weir gives several arguments in favor of this. In addition to the surname, Margaret also became a nun in the very prestigious Barking Abbey, and the King himself took care of this, which indicates her rather high social status; it is possible that this appointment was taken care of by John of Gaunt, who in 1377 was Katherine's lover. At the same time, the King appointed to the Priory of Saint Helena Elizabeth Chaucer, who was probably the daughter of Philippa, Katherine's sister, which, according to Weir, also indicates the relationship of the two girls; later Elizabeth was also transferred to Barking. In addition, there is evidence that Barking Abbey was patronized by Katherine's two sons, born from her connection with John of Gaunt; this could be explained by that their half-sister lived there. In addition, from a chronological point of view, she could well be the daughter of Hugh and Katherine.) Thomas Stapleton in 1846 also hypothesized that another daughter, Dorothy, who married Thomas Thymelby of Pulham near Horncastle (died 1390), Sheriff of Lincolnshire in 1380, could have been born in this marriage. Although a number of researchers reject this statement, indicating that the name Dorothy was not used in England until the 16th century, however, Alison Weir indicates that there are cases of its use in medieval England, and the image of St. Dorothea of Caesarea, known in England since the time of the Anglo-Saxon conquest, is often found on stained-glass windows, especially at the end of the 14th–15th centuries. Weir admits that the unusual choice of name could be associated with her birth on the saint's memorial day – 6 February. In addition, Weir points out that in the church at Irnham on the tombs and stained glass windows there are coats of arms of several prominent Lincolnshire families related by marriage, including Swynford and Thymelby. In her opinion, Dorothy could have been born around 1366. It is possible that other children who died in infancy could have been born in the marriage.

Like many other families in the service of John of Gaunt, Katherine and her husband often lived at the ducal court, and specially appointed officials managed their estates in their absence. At the same time, Hugh Swynford spent a significant part of his married life in various foreign military campaigns of the Duke in France and Spain. In particular, he participated in the military campaigns of 1366 and 1370. Most likely, Katherine continued to serve the Duchess between births, and her growing children could be brought up together with the children of the Ducal couple.

Katherine's main duty at the ducal court was probably the care of the ducal children. Of the seven children born in the marriage of John of Gaunt and Blanche of Lancaster, only three survived to adulthood: two daughters, Philippa (later Queen consort of Portugal) and Elizabeth (by her three marriages Countess of Pembroke, Duchess of Exeter and Lady Cornwall), and one son, Henry Bolingbroke, who later became King of England under the name of Henry IV.

Shortly before 21 January 1365, John Bokyngham, Bishop of Lincoln, conferred on Katherine the privilege of privately church worship whenever she visited Leicester, which, according to Alison Weir, indicates that she was not only devout, but also a quite important and respected parishioner. In addition, to perform worship, she needed a chapel, a prayer house or a separate room, as well as a portable altar. However, Weir believes that it is unlikely that Katherine enjoyed such privilege in 1365.

In November 1366, Hugh Swynford traveled to Aquitaine to join John of Gaunt's military expedition to Castile. Katherine, who was expecting a child, remained to serve Duchess Blanche, who was also pregnant. By Christmas, the Duchess had settled in her husband's Bolingbroke Castle, where she gave birth to a son, Henry, in April. In mid-February 1367, Katherine moved to Lincoln, where on 24 February she gave birth to a son, Thomas. (Note: In Hugh Swynford's inquisition post mortem dated June 1372, is mentioned that Thomas was 4 years old at this time, on the basis of which his date of birth is often attributed to February 1368, but Hugh did not return to England until October 1367. Moreover, there were often errors in these proceedings. So, during the trial to establish the coming of age of Thomas Swynford, which was held between 22 June 1394 and 22 June 1395, 13 witnesses stated that he was born in 1373 –15 months after the death of his father. Alison Weir suggests that in 1373 another son of Katherine, John Beaufort, was baptized, and the witnesses confused them. The researcher points out that none of the relatives of Hugh Swynford after his death made any claims to his inheritance, so there was no doubt about Thomas' legitimacy.) He was baptized at St. Margaret's Church of Lincoln Cathedral and named after his paternal grandfather and one of his godparents, Canon Thomas Sutton.

Blanche of Lancaster, wife of John of Gaunt, died on 12 September 1368 at Tutbury Castle, Staffordshire. It is not known whether Katherine was present, but she, along with other ladies from the household of the late Duchess, accompanied the funeral cortege with her remains, who went south, and may have attended her funeral in London, at St. Paul's Cathedral. The death of the Duchess of Lancaster brought about major changes in Katherine's life. Usually, after the death of a noble lady, her household was dismissed. However, John of Gaunt had three small children to take care of. Katherine, who seemed to be highly regarded in the Duke's household, got along well with the children. Therefore, it has been suggested that she remained in the nursery. Although there are statements that she was their governess at this point, Alison Weir indicates that other noble ladies performed these functions. In 1369, John of Gaunt appointed Alice FitzAlan, Lady Holland (cousin of the late Duchess) as the children's governess, with a salary of £66 13s 4d per year. She performed these duties until November 1371. In addition, in 1370, the Duke granted Eileen, the wife of his squire Edward Herberge, a pension of £100 for "the diligence and good service she has rendered to our dear daughter Philippa". Weir believes that Eileen Gerberge was a trusted lady who was present at the time of the Duchess's death and was then appointed to look after Philippa. She was later assigned to the service of Gaunt's second wife.

From 1368 until at least September 1369, Blanche Swynford, Katherine's eldest daughter, lived in the ducal household as a lady-in-waiting to Philippa and Elizabeth, daughters of John of Gaunt. Since the registers of the Duke's household for the years 1369–1372 have not been preserved, it is not known how long she remained in this capacity after 1369. There is no evidence that her mother lived at this time in the ducal house. Alison Weir suggests that Katherine, who had her own family, lived at that time in her estate of Kettlethorpe.

In August–September 1369, Hugh Swynford, as part of the army of John of Gaunt, participated in a military campaign in France, where the Hundred Years' War resumed; he returned to England probably in November. On 14 August of that year, Queen Philippa died. On 1 September, King Edward III ordered that mourning clothes be provided to his family and the servants of the late Queen. This included clothing for Blanche Swynford, "damuselle of the daughters of the Duke of Lancaster", which, according to Weir, indicates that the Queen showed concern for Katherine and her family until the end of her life. It is likely that she, being a pupil of the Queen, was present on 29 January 1370 at the Queen's solemn funeral in Westminster Abbey, after which she returned to Kettlethorpe.

In 1370 Hugh Swynford again went on a military expedition with the Duke of Lancaster, this time to Aquitaine. When John of Gaunt, who had married Constance of Castile in the autumn of 1371, returned to England, Hugh no longer accompanied him. Probably due to illness, Katherine's husband died in Aquitaine on 13 November 1371.

=== Mistress of the Duke of Lancaster ===
Katherine's position after the death of her husband was not the best, since his financial condition was poor, and she had several small children to care for. But the Duke of Lancaster came to her aid. Although no documentary evidence of Katherine's presence in the household of the new Duchess before March 1373 has survived, there are facts that, according to Alison Weir, indicate that John of Gaunt accepted Katherine into the service of his new wife, possibly in the same quality, as with the late Duchess Blanche. In the spring of 1372 John of Gaunt and the King helped her financially; and in the summer of the same year, Katherine was present at the birth of the first child by Duchess Constance, a daughter called Catherine. There is also documentary evidence that in the same year, Philippa Chaucer, Katherine's sister, was in the service of the Duchess. In addition, the fact that it was Katherine who was chosen to inform the King about the birth of his new granddaughter speaks of the position she occupied.

The Duke's new wife settled into Hertford Castle in early 1372, and Gaunt's three children from his first marriage were also sent there. Katherine and her sister also resided there, becoming members of the Duchess Constance's household. It can be assumed that Katherine's duties included looking after the Duke's children, who she knew well.

It is not established when exactly Katherine became John of Gaunt's mistress. Jean Froissart wrote that the love affair began during the lifetime of Blanche of Lancaster and Hugh Swynford, but he sometimes made mistakes in his chronicle (in particular, he pointed out that Katherine gave birth to three children from John of Gaunt, although there were four of them). Therefore, according to Alison Weir, his testimony cannot be considered reliable, because the people who provided him with information could be wrong. Also, some later studies indicate that the love affair between Katherine and John of Gaunt began during the life of her first husband, and her eldest son Thomas Swynford was "a child from two fathers", but this seems unlikely to modern researchers. In the document of the grant of an annuity to Katherine Swynford by King Richard II dated 7 June 1392, it is indicated that her first-born son with the Duke of Lancaster, John Beaufort, was 21 years old. Based on this, he must have been born between June 1371 and June 1372. However, Alison Weir doubts that he could have been born at this time, as from June 1370 to November 1371 the Duke was in Aquitaine, where in September 1371 he married Constance of Castile. Although it is possible that Katherine could have joined her husband in Aquitaine, Weir considers this unlikely as wives rarely accompanied their husbands to war. In addition, someone had to manage the estates in England and take care of small children during Gaunt's absence. In a petition to the Pope dated 1 September 1396, John of Gaunt indicates that the affair began when he was married to Constance of Castile, and Katherine was free from marriage. Therefore the affair, according to him, began after the death of Katherine's husband. Based on this, Weir concludes that most likely the love affair began in the late autumn of 1372, when there was a significant increase in Katherine's social status in the Lancastrian household.

Due to Hugh Swynford's heir, Thomas, being a minor at the time of his father's death, the family estates usually passed into the custody of the overlord, in this case the King and Duke of Lancaster. However, they quickly took measures to improve the financial situation of Hugh's widow, which was unusual for that time, and was explained, apparently, because the affair between Katherine and John of Gaunt had already begun. The first documentary evidence is a gift of £10 made by the Duke at the Savoy Palace on 1 May 1372 "to our very dear damoiselle Katherine de Swynford". On 15 May, he generously increased her annuity from the Duchy of Lancaster from 20 to 50 marks "for the good and pleasant services she rendered to our dear companion [Blanche] ... and for the very great love which our companion rendered to Katherine." On 8 June King Edward III, probably at the suggestion of his son, ordered his escheator (Note: Escheator — an official in medieval England, who was involved in the control of escheated property after the death of the landowner.) to transfer her widow's share to Katherine, provided that she would give her word not to remarry without the consent of the King; she entered into her possession on 26 June, when she took the oath, and on 20 June, the Duke gave her custody of all the possessions that her son was supposed to inherit. As a result, Katherine, until her son attained his legal majority of age, received the management of the estate of Kettlethorpe, as well as a third of the estate of Colby.

The inquisition post mortem for the succession of Hugh Swynford took place on 24 June in Lincolnshire and 25 July 1372 at Navenby. As a result, Thomas Swynford was recognized as his father's heir, but it was noted that the estates of Kettlethorpe and Colby were in poor condition and were worth almost nothing. The King and the Duke of Lancaster again came to the aid of Katherine. As a result, on 12 September, in exchange for £20, which she had to pay to the treasury, Katherine was given the remaining 2/3 of the Colby estate, as well as the right to arrange the marriage of her son Thomas.

Katherine most probably attended Duchess Constance at the birth of her daughter on 31 March 1373, as she conveyed the news of this birth to King Edward III, for which he awarded her 20 marks. This happened, according to Alison Weir, in the summer of 1372. However, after her own pregnancy became apparent, Katherine most likely returned to Kettlethorpe.

Between 1373 and 1381, Katherine bore at least four children to the Duke of Lancaster: three sons and a daughter. The dates of their births are not mentioned in the documents, however, the researchers calculated the possible years of birth based on indirect data. The eldest of these was John, who was probably born in the winter of 1372–1373. Alison Weir believes that Katherine's eldest son from her affair may have been the child for whose baptism rich cloths were sent to Lincoln in February 1373. He received his name in honor of his father, and also received the surname Beaufort (which was worn by the rest of the children of Katherine and John of Gaunt). It is associated with the Beaufort Castle in Champagne, which went to the duke as part of the Lancastrian inheritance. However, it is possible that this could have been a compliment to Roger de Beaufort, brother of Pope Gregory XI, who was a prisoner of Gaunt in the 1370s and with whom he later maintained close diplomatic contacts. Old studies claimed that all of Katherine's children were born in Beaufort Castle, but this information is false: John of Gaunt never visited it, and in 1369 he sold the domain. According to Weir, John was most likely born in Lincoln, and his childhood years were spent in Kettlethorpe, since John of Gaunt tried not to advertise the affair with Katherine.

By 31 March 1373, Katherine returned to Savoy Palace, where John of Gaunt lived at that time. Henry Knighton, writing his chronicle after 1378, indicates that Katherine served in the household of Duchess Constance, but none of the Duke's grants made to his mistress during this period state that they were given for service to his wife. Although Katherine appears to have occasionally visited the Duchess, she was not her lady-in-waiting. John of Gaunt found another post for her, appointing her mistress as the governess to Philippa and Elizabeth, his daughters from his first marriage. It is possible that Katherine also took care of his son Henry for some time, until another tutor was appointed to him in 1374. The exact date of Katherine's appointment to this position is unknown. In 1368–1372, the daughters of John of Gaunt, judging by the surviving news, had other governesses. Alison Weir believes that the appointment took place in the spring of 1373 —after the birth of Katherine's son John Beaufort. She had enough skills to care for children. In addition to her own, Katherine apparently helped in the care of the ducal children during the life of Duchess Blanche. Although the position itself was essentially a ploy so that the Duke could see his mistress, there is evidence that Katherine spent quite a lot of time with the Duke's daughters. Having received official status, she received a legitimate reason for living in the ducal household.

It is likely that by 1373, the Castilian ladies of his wife knew that the Duke had a mistress, as a result of which, angry because of their gossip, John of Gaunt sent them to Nuneaton Priory. By the end of 1374 the ladies, weary of the monastic regime, begged to be allowed to leave Nuneaton, but their request was only granted in 1375, when the Duke allowed them to settle in Leicester with some of his trusted vassals. He later arranged marriages for some of the ladies. Apparently, Duchess Constance also knew about her husband's affair, but for her the return of the Castilian throne was much more important. (Note: Constance of Castile, the second wife of John of Gaunt, was the daughter of King Peter of Castile, who was deposed and killed by his half-brother Henry of Trastamara in 1369. As the eldest surviving (and formally legitimized) child of King Peter, she had rights to the Castilian throne.)

In the summer of 1373, John of Gaunt was preparing for a new military expedition to France. There is evidence that Katherine at that time visited the Duke at the Northbourn estate, where she was from 27 June to 16 July. Most likely, there she complained to John of Gaunt that her allowance was not paid on time; as a result, on 27 June he wrote an angry letter to John de Stafford ordering that the annuity promised to her be paid without delay to "the dear and beloved Madame Katherine de Swynford". It is probable that after this she returned to Kettlethorpe, since the Duke promised to send her venison and firewood there. She later moved to Tutbury Castle, where John's wife and four legitimate children were to live during his absence from England.

On 12 September 1374, Katherine may have been present, along with John of Gaunt, who had returned from France, at a memorial ceremony in honor of the late Duchess Blanche, held at St. Paul's Cathedral, although there is no documentary evidence of this. On 26 September, the duke, while at Savenby, ordered John de Stafford to pay Katherine a gift of £25. By 1376, she was in charge of the household of Gaunt's daughters, who were also given their own rooms and wardrobes.

Katherine probably celebrated Christmas of 1375 with John of Gaunt at Eltham Palace, and on 1 January 1376 the Duke granted his mistress the lucrative wardship of the heir Sir Robert Deincourt, and the right to marry him with Blanche Swynford, Katherine's eldest daughter from her first marriage, who was approaching the marriageable age of 12 years. It is likely that John of Gaunt planned the marriage of Blanche with the young heir, but there was no evidence of her future fate, from which Alison Weir concluded that Blanche Swynford died young, before the wedding took place. Robert himself, having become an adult, in the years 1387–1392 requested his inheritance. On 2 January the Duke, who went to Hertford Castle, instructed to pay Katherine 1 mark, and also appointed her an annual annuity of 50 marks, possibly due to the fact that she was again pregnant. On 14 January John of Gaunt ordered that a barrel of the best Gascon wine be sent to Katherine, who had returned to Kettlethorpe.

Katherine spent the summer of 1375 in Kenilworth and at that time, according to Alison Weir, she gave birth to her second son from John of Gaunt. She probably went to Lincoln to give birth, since in August the Duke ordered that the local midwife be rewarded. Also on 24 July, John of Gaunt ordered that 60 oak trees be sent to Kettlethorpe to renovate Katherine's estate. In the same year, she was paid 100 marks. Also, according to the order of the Duke, which may date back to 1375 or 1377, Katherine was presented with tenement houses on the east bank of the River Witham in the Lincolnshire port of Boston, formerly owned by Geoffrey de Sutton. These included the estate of Gisors Hall, which included a house with two hectares of land, a garden and outbuildings, which was allocated by John of Gaunt from the County of Richmond until 1372. Later Gisors Hall was bequeathed by Katherine to her son Thomas Beaufort.

The second son of Katherine and John of Gaunt seems to have been Henry Beaufort, who was named probably after Henry of Grosmont, 1st Duke of Lancaster. Although it has been hypothesized that the future Cardinal was the youngest of Katherine's sons, since in 1398 he was called a "boy" when he was appointed Bishop of Lincoln, but, according to Alison Weir, this epithet was simply a derisive comment on Henry's elevation to the bishopric at the age of 23. The 17th-century genealogist Francis Sanford lists the Cardinal as the second son, and he is also listed second in the Beaufort list of the Papal bull for their legitimization of 1397.

In August 1375, Katherine accompanied John of Gaunt on his trip to Leicester. It is possible that it was then that the mayor of Leicester, William Ferrour, spent 16 shillings to present wine as a gift to "Lady Katherine Swynford, mistress of the Duke of Lancaster". The record of this payment is dated 1375–1376 and is the first documentary evidence that John of Gaunt's love affair became public. Anthony Goodman suggests that this news indicates that Katherine usurped the rightful place of the Duchess of Lancaster, but Alison Weir does not agree with this; according to her, Katherine avoided involvement in politics and tried to keep a low profile, since very few cases are known when she used her position. In addition, she apparently maintained her status as a widow. In September, Katherine returned to Kettlethorpe.

On 25 July 1376, John of Gaunt granted Katherine Swynford, who was probably again pregnant, custody and right of marriage over Bertram de Soneby's heiress. By 1376–1377 is the first recorded payment for the cost of the wardrobe and chambers of Philippa of Lancaster in the amount of £50, paid to Katherine. Also by order of the Duke, she was to be paid £100 in equal installments at Easter and St. Michael's to cover expenses for which she was to account. It is probable that during the meeting of the Good Parliament and the turbulent events that followed, Katherine took care of John of Gaunt's daughters, possibly living in the Savoy Palace.

It is likely that John of Gaunt's legitimate children perceived his illegitimate children as brothers and sisters, possibly including Katherine's children from her first marriage in the family circle. According to the surviving information, Katherine and John were good and caring parents. So the "Anonymous Chronicle" reports that Katherine "loved the Duke of Lancaster and the children born from him".

In 1376, at the request of Gaunt, the Pope granted Katherine permission to have a portable altar in her residence in the Diocese of Lincoln.

At the end of 1376, Katherine disappears from the sources; it is likely that this is due to the birth of her third child by John of Gaunt, which occurred in early 1377. Perhaps that is why on 25 February 1377, the King allowed his son to give his mistress the estates of Gringley and Whitley (Nottinghamshire), which brought an annual income of £150. Also, the Duke at the same time sent Katherine a barrel of wine as a gift. Sydney Armitage-Smith, author of a study on John of Gaunt, suggested that Thomas Beaufort, the youngest of the sons of John of Gaunt and Katherine, was born in early 1377, but Alison Weir believes that, most likely, their only daughter Joan Beaufort was born then. (Note: It is traditionally believed that Joan Beaufort was born in 1379, however, Alison Weir points out that at the time of the birth of her first child, she would be barely 14 years old, as a result of which the 1377 year of birth looks more realistic for her.) She was probably named in honor of the Dowager Princess of Wales, Joan of Kent. The child's birthplace may have been Kettlethorpe, but it is possible that both Joan and Thomas were born at Pleshey Castle in Essex. Anthony Goodman, who adhered to the traditional date of Joan's birth (1379), believed that since John of Gaunt was hated in England, and anyone who was dear to him was at risk, Katherine was taken to Pleshey Castle, which at that time belonged to Joan Fitzalan, Dowager Countess of Hereford. She was a close relative of the Duke's first wife through her mother. In addition, in 1376 her daughter Eleanor de Bohun married Thomas of Woodstock, John of Gaunt's younger brother. In favor of this birthplace of Katherine's younger children, the fact that Joan Fitzalan was the godmother of Thomas Beaufort, and later he was taken into the house of the Countess's youngest daughter, Mary de Bohun (later wife of Henry Bolingbroke, John of Gaunt's only surviving legitimate son), testifies in favor of this place of birth. Alison Weir also adheres to the same version of Joan's birthplace. Historians suggest that Katherine and John of Gaunt may have had other children who did not survive infancy.

After receiving Gringley (located 12 miles northwest of Kettlethorpe) and Wheatley (3 miles south of Greenley and 9 miles northwest of Kettlethorpe), which the King confirmed on 4 March 1377, Katherine became a reasonably wealthy woman. In addition, in the same year, John of Gaunt granted her two more estates in Lincolnshire – Waddington (5 miles south of Lincoln) and Wellingore (12 miles south of Lincoln).

=== Formal break with John of Gaunt ===
In June 1377, King Edward III died. It is possible that Katherine, who was the governess of the late monarch's granddaughters, was in London during this period, but it is unlikely that she often saw the Duke busy preparing for the coronation of his infant nephew and new King Richard II. Although John of Gaunt was not officially a member of the regency council, but among his 12 lords there were 5 of his supporters, so he could influence decisions. Already on 20 July, the young King confirmed the grant to Katherine Swynford of the Gringley and Wheatley estates, and on 24 July the Duke again presented her with oaks for the repair of Kettlethorpe.

The first public appearance of John of Gaunt with Katherine Swynford, which made their affair explicit, is in March 1378. Thomas Walsingham wrote in his "Chronicle" that the Duke, "casting aside every shame of man and the fear of God, allowed himself to be seen riding through the Duchy with his concubine, a certain Katherine Swynford". Further, the chronicler reports that the people were indignant and despaired because of such scandalous behavior. In his opinion, it was because of Katherine, whom he called "a witch and a whore", that "the most terrible curses and vile insults began to circulate against the Duke". Walsingham's account is the first mention of the name of the Duke's mistress in chronicles. In the future, a negative attitude towards Katherine is also found in the messages of some other chroniclers. Even Henry Knighton, pro-Lancastrian, did not approve of Gaunt's mistress: "a certain foreigner Katherine Swynford lived in his wife's house, whose relationship with him was very suspicious". In addition, the chronicler points out that the love affair disturbed members of the Duke's family, who feared its consequences. John of Gaunt himself in 1381 said that clerics and servants repeatedly warned him about the detrimental effect of his connection with Katherine on his reputation, but he ignored them.

In April 1378, Katherine probably returned to Kettlethorpe, where she received occasional visits from the Duke. In addition, during this period, her sister, Philippa Chaucer, settled on the estate. In later years, Katherine seems to have used some of her income to buy small plots of land in nearby villages, expanding her holdings in Kettlethorpe and Colby.

On 20 January 1381, the Duke gave Katherine the custody of the lands and wardship of the heiress of the late Alice de Thorsby, a member of his household. These properties were located about twelve miles west of Kettlethorpe. In return, she was to provide all the services "due and customary". However, the next day this condition about services was removed. According to Alison Weir, this award is connected with the birth this month of their last known child, Thomas Beaufort.

John of Gaunt's love affair with Katherine Swynford caused public condemnation. Modern chroniclers, who called him a bigamist, condemned the fact that the income of the Duke's mistress was greater than that of his wife. Walsingham relates that after the Peasants' Revolt of 1381, the Duke "blamed himself for the death of [those] who had been overthrown by unholy violence" and "reproached himself for his connection with Katherine Swynford, or rather forswearing her". (Note: During the uprising, ordinary people mainly blamed John of Gaunt for their troubles, military failures and government machinations. The leaders of the rebels published a list of "traitors to the King", at the head of which was the name of the Duke. Hostility towards him also manifested itself in the fact that widespread attacks were made on his estates in East Anglia, and his main London residence, the Savoy Palace, was burned to the ground. The Duke himself, however, was in Scotland at that time. Where Katherine was at that time has not been established, but certainly she was not in London.) As a result, in July, John of Gaunt was forced to officially announce his intention to part with his mistress and reconcile with his wife. Katherine resigned her position as governess and left the Lancaster household in September, receiving an annuity of £200. She settled in Lincoln, renting for 50 shillings per year a house in Minster Yard formerly occupied by the Chancellors of Lincoln Cathedral. She remained in this residence until at least 1393.

=== Lady Kettlethorpe ===
However, the break was only formal. Katherine's relationship with John of Gaunt and the rest of his family continued to be quite cordial. In 1382 she and her daughter Joan Beaufort visited Mary de Bohun, the wife of Henry Bolingbroke, who was expecting a child. The Duke continued to provide for her and their children, and when John of Gaunt himself needed money, Katherine lent him money, for example in 1386, when she helped the Duke to finance his Castilian expedition. In 1387 she received a New Year's gift from Mary de Bohun. In the early 1390s, she often visited the court of John of Gaunt, where a stable and a dozen horses were allocated for her convenience. In addition, in 1382, the Duke placed Thomas Swynford, Katherine's son from her first marriage, in the retinue of Henry Bolingbroke. At the same time, apparently, until at least 1389, John of Gaunt kept his promise and did not enter into a love relationship with his former mistress, especially since during this period he was mostly outside of England.

On 20 October 1383 King Richard II, who apparently sympathized with Katherine, granted her the right to fence 300 acres of land and forest on the estate of Kettlethorpe, and in April 1387, he made her a Lady of the Order of the Garter, which during this period was considered the highest honor an Englishwoman could receive. According to Alison Weir, this was a tacit recognition of Katherine's special relationship with John of Gaunt. In addition, it is possible that in this way the King tried to enlist the support of his uncle against the opposition that existed at court, dissatisfied with the sovereign's dependence on favorites. In August 1388 a new set of clothing made of scarlet wool was paid for by the King for Katherine, and in the same year she arrived at Windsor Castle to participate, along with 10 other ladies of the Order, in a large feast hosted by King Richard II on St. George's Day.

On Christmas Day of 1387, Katherine agreed, along with her daughter Joan Beaufort, to become part of the household of Mary de Bohun. As a result, she took a place of honor in the royal court. It is likely that her duties included looking after their rapidly growing family, starting with the infant Henry of Monmouth (future King Henry V).

In November 1389, John of Gaunt returned to England after a three-year absence. Although there are no records of Katherine during this period, and she herself seems to have spent most of her time in Lincolnshire, there is much evidence that the Duke at this time began to plan for the future of his illegitimate children. The second son, Henry Beaufort, destined for the service of the church, began to receive church benefices from January 1390. The eldest son, John Beaufort, who "was a great favorite of his father", in the spring of 1390 took part in a large jousting tournament at Saint-Inglevert near Calais, after which he began to participate in military campaigns. Also in December 1390, the King authorized the Duke to grant a number of estates in Northamptonshire to John Beaufort. Around 1392, John of Gaunt arranged the marriage of his daughter Joan Beaufort to Robert Ferrers of Wem, and before 28 September 1397 the Duke also orchestrated the wedding of John Beaufort with Margaret Holland, uterine niece of King Richard II.

Apparently, in 1391, relations between Katherine and John of Gaunt resumed, after which she again began to occupy an important place in his life. It is possible that they received this opportunity due to the fact that at that time the Duke's wife began to live separately from her husband. However, during this period, Katherine did not live permanently with Gaunt, continuing at least until 1393 to rent a house in Lincoln. It is possible that they again became lovers, but at the same time they tried to behave cautiously.

=== Duchess of Lancaster ===
On 24 March 1394, Constance of Castile, 2nd wife of John of Gaunt, died. Apparently, after that, the Duke decided to marry Katherine. In addition to the feelings that he had for his long-term mistress, most likely, in this way he also wanted to legitimize his children.

Although Thomas Walsingham argued that the planned marriage came as a surprise to the King, Alison Weir notes that this is unlikely. The marriage itself took place at Lincoln Cathedral on 13 January 1396. (Note: Some sources indicate 14 January or the end of February 1396 as the date of marriage.) After that, Katherine became the Duchess of Lancaster and for some time the first lady of the Kingdom, since the first wife of King Richard II had died by that time, and he entered into a second marriage in November. To emphasize her status and smooth out memories of the past, she made her coat of arms instead of the silver rings depicted on the coat of arms of de Roet family, the three wheels of St. Catherine –her patroness, who was associated with royalty and virtue. After the wedding, the ducal couple made a short trip to the north, after which, by 23 January, they settled for some time in Pontefract Castle.

This marriage caused alarm at the royal court and general disapproval, for it was considered a mésalliance. For the first time in her new status, Katherine apparently appeared at court in April 1396 at the celebration of St. George's Day. John of Gaunt's brother, Thomas of Woodstock, Duke of Gloucester, and his wife, Eleanor de Bohun, were most outraged. At the same time, the ducal couple did not have any document allowing the marriage –only the oral permission of the Pope, so there were fears that the marriage could be challenged and annulled. (Note: John of Gaunt was the godfather of Katherine's eldest daughter from her first marriage, which at that time was considered an obstacle to marriage.) Therefore, the Duke wrote to the Pope, asking for apostolic permission. In anticipation, the couple settled in Ely Place in London. On 16 May John of Gaunt appointed £600 per year for the maintenance of his wife. In addition, the new Duchess had her own wardrobe and household.

On 1 September 1396 Pope Boniface IX declared the marriage of John of Gaunt and Katherine Swynford as valid by a bull. In addition, he legitimized their children born before marriage –the Beauforts. This news seems to have reached England before 7 October, when the ducal couple sailed from England to Calais, where a lavish ceremony took place on 4 November, as a result of which King Richard II married Princess Isabella of France, daughter of King Charles VI. According to Jean Froissart, it was Katherine who until the end of the summer "was the companion of the young Queen of England", probably becoming her companion immediately after the marriage. (Note: Isabella was about 7 years old at the time of the marriage, and Katherine had extensive experience in raising children.) The King, Queen and their retinue returned to England on 12 November and the next day they solemnly entered London.

The legitimization of the Beauforts had a beneficial effect on their later careers. In addition, shortly after the return of John of Gaunt and Katherine to England, their widowed daughter, Joan Beaufort, was married to Ralph Neville, 4th Baron Neville de Raby, a powerful northern noblemen. In February 1397, King Richard II confirmed the Beauforts' legitimation by a decree during a meeting of the English Parliament. In addition, on 10 February John Beaufort received the title of Earl of Somerset, and the next day, the King approved joint ownership of John of Gaunt and his wife for estates in Yorkshire, Norfolk and Sussex, which the Duke received in 1372 in exchange for the Earldom of Richmond. Katherine retained control over them even after the death of her husband. Also, a number of awards were made to the youngest son, Thomas Beaufort, and Henry Beaufort became a Deacon and Chancellor of Oxford University.

During the first 18 months of their marriage, Katherine was often at court, where she held a prominent position. However, little is known about how she lived in the subsequent period until the death of her husband.

John of Gaunt's health declined in the last years of his life. In addition, his heir, Henry Bolingbroke, was on bad terms with King Richard II, and in September 1398 he was expelled from England by royal order, which, by all accounts, aggravated the Duke's illness. Its nature is unknown, but it has been suggested that the John of Gaunt had some kind of venereal disease. If this suspicion is correct, then, as Alison Weir points out, it is possible that Katherine could also have been infected with it.

On 3 February 1399, John of Gaunt, who lived at Leicester Castle, made a detailed will: according to him, furniture, jewelry and rich clothes were left to his wife. He died on the same day.

=== Last years ===
Immediately after the death of the Duke, the royal escheators unlawfully took into custody all the possessions belonging to Katherine, as well as the Lancaster estates. As a result, she had to make a request to King Richard II, who on 9 March 1399 ordered the estates to be returned. Also, the sovereign confirmed to the Dowager Duchess the annual annuity of £1,000, levied on the lands of the Duchy of Lancaster, which her husband assigned to her. At the same time, on 18 March, without any legal pretext, the King announced that he was replacing the 10-year exile of Henry Bolingbroke with a life sentence, and would confiscate those possessions that he was supposed to inherit. Although King Richard II did not grieve very much about the death of his uncle, he allowed Katherine to keep the lands she received as a dowry, and in May, when his royal escheators seized the lands that belonged to her before her marriage, he ordered them to be returned. After that, the Dowager Duchess tried to keep aloof and did not protest against the confiscation of the Lancastrian inheritance. Not wanting to live on one of her estates, Katherine left for Lincoln. She passed custody of Kettlethorpe and Colby to her son, Thomas Swynford, and for housing she rented a house in Minster Yard, which she rented until her death.

There are few references to Katherine in the last years of her life. In the autumn of 1399, Henry Bolingbroke invaded England and deposed King Richard II, crowned himself as Henry IV. Katherine's children, the Beauforts and Thomas Swynford, and her son-in-law Ralph Neville supported the usurpation of the throne. The new king officially began to call his stepmother "the Mother of the King." However, apparently, Katherine led a quiet life in Lincoln, not taking any part in the political life of the Kingdom.

On 12 February 1400, King Henry IV granted Katherine the estate of Laughton en le Morthen near Tickhill in Yorkshire. Around this time he also gave her £200 per year from the lands of Huntingdonshire and an annual income of 700 marks from the estate of Lincolnshire, and confirmed the annuity of £1,000 assigned to her by his father. As a result, she became quite a rich woman. It is also known that Katherine owned houses in Lincoln, Boston, Grantham and King's Lynn and had business dealings with merchants from some of these cities. It is possible that the Dowager Duchess had long-standing commercial interests in the wool trade, as it is known that she had property inherited from her father in Hainaut, a major center for the wool trade. Alison Weir believes that, perhaps, by investing money in such enterprises, Katherine tried to expand the Swynford inheritance.

=== Death and burial ===
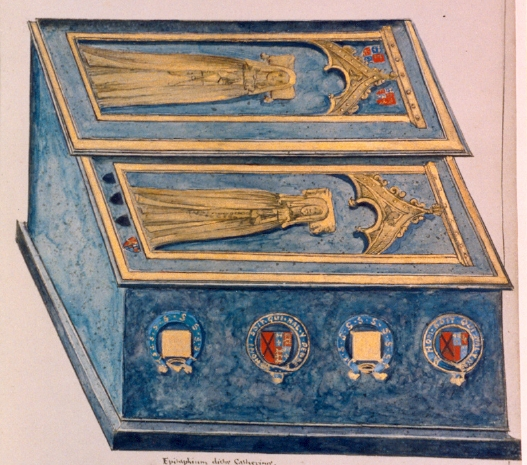
Katherine's tomb, the larger tomb, next to the tomb of her daughter, Joan Beaufort. Drawing by William Dugdale.

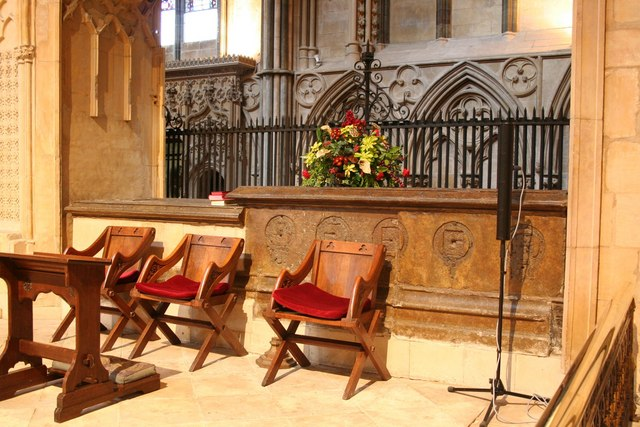
Restored in the 17th century, the tomb of Katherine Swynford and her daughter Joan Beaufort in one of the choirs of Lincoln Cathedral.

Katherine Swynford died on 10 May 1403 at Lincoln. She was buried at Lincoln Cathedral in the choir of angels. The chest of her tombstone was made of Purbeck marble, had a stucco plinth and a lid. Heraldic shields surrounded by garters were depicted on it. The tombstone was crowned with a brass canopy, on which Katherine herself was depicted in a widow's wimple, and above it rose a vaulted canopy with trefoil arches. Francis Thynne, a Lancastrian antiquary and officer of arms at the College of Arms, about 1600 copied an epitaph which said: “Here lies Lady Katherine, Duchess of Lancaster, wife of the very noble and very gracious Prince John, Duke of Lancaster, son of the very noble King Edward III, who died 10 May in the year of grace 1403, whose soul God will have mercy and pity. Amen".

Her daughter, Joan Beaufort, was buried next to her mother. In her will, she requested that her mother's burial site be expanded and enclosed, if the Dean and Chapter would not object. Three years before her death (28 November 1437) Joan received permission from King Henry VI to establish a chapel with two chaplains to serve daily at the altar in front of her mother's grave. She was also allowed to use the advowson (patronage) of Welton Church in Howdenshire, formerly owned by Durham Priory, but transferred to the Neville family in the 1380s. It is likely that the new chapel was to replace the one founded at Lincoln Cathedral by John of Gaunt in 1398, however it is unknown if this was done. It has not been determined whether the surviving tomb was built after the death in 1403 of Katherine Swynford or after Joan Beaufort's death in 1440; given that Joan's will expressed a desire to enclose her mother's grave, it is most likely that the wrought iron screen was created around 1440. Originally, Joan's remains were located side by side with her mother.

The chapel existed until the middle of the 16th century, services in it were abolished during the reign of King Edward VI. Her possessions, valued at £13.6 and 6 pence, included two bowls, two silver vessels (for holding Holy water and Eucharist wine), a silver Pax and a silver bell. The burials of Joan Beaufort and Katherine Swynford, standing side by side, were described at the beginning of the 16th century by the royal antiquarian John Leland. Around 1640, William Dugdale carefully sketched the graves.

In 1644, during the English Civil War, both burials were partially destroyed by the Roundheads during the sacking of Lincoln Cathedral. As a result, copper images and tablets were torn off, and the masonry of the chapel was badly damaged. By 1672, the tomb boxes were in their present position, and the canopy was clumsily restored. In the 19th century, a "Gothic" restoration of monuments was planned, but it was eventually abandoned. Although there are claims that the tombs are now empty and that the remains of Katherine and Joan were pulled out by the Roundheads, they are most likely unsubstantiated, as there is no evidence that the bodies were disturbed. They are probably still under the floor of the tomb.

Currently, both burials stand close to each other with a short side. Katherine's tomb has indentations showing where armorial shields were previously located. From the chapel, which once housed the tombs, only a carefully restored canopy, east and west pilasters and a wrought iron grating on a pedestal have survived.

== Aftermath ==
After the ascension to the English throne of John of Gaunt's heir Henry IV, Katherine Swynford's children from John of Gaunt played a prominent role in English politics. On 9 February 1407, the King confirmed the legitimation of his half-sibilings the Beauforts, but specifically stipulated by a clause ('excepta dignitate regali') that they did not have any rights to the English throne, although modern scholarship disputes the authority of a monarch to alter an existing parliamentary statute on his own authority, without the further approval of Parliament.

Katherine's granddaughter, Cecily Neville (daughter of Joan Beaufort and her second husband Ralph Neville, 1st Earl of Westmorland), became the wife of Richard of York, 3rd Duke of York; from this marriage were born, among others, Kings Edward IV and Richard III. Another granddaughter, Joan Beaufort (daughter of John Beaufort, 1st Earl of Somerset) married King James I of Scotland and became the ancestor of the succeeding Scottish monarchs from the House of Stuart. Another descendant of Katherine, Margaret Beaufort (granddaughter of John Beaufort, 1st Earl of Somerset), became the mother of King Henry VII, the progenitor of the House of Tudor. He justified his right to the throne precisely by his descent from the House of Beaufort. In consequence, Katherine Swynford became in the direct ancestor of all subsequent Kings and Queens of England (and then Great Britain).

The Beauforts themselves played a prominent role during the Wars of the Roses. Although after the death in 1471 of Edmund Beaufort, styled 4th Duke of Somerset, the family died out in the male line, but a side branch remained, the ancestor of which was Charles Somerset, 1st Earl of Worcester, the illegitimate son of Henry Beaufort, 3rd Duke of Somerset. It still exists today, with the head being the Duke of Beaufort, created in 1682 by King Charles II in recognition of his "most conspicuous descent from King Edward III by John Beaufort, eldest son of John of Gaunt and Katherine Swynford".

Thomas [II] Swynford, Katherine's son from her first marriage, made a career at the court of King Henry IV, who made him a number of awards. In late 1399 – early 1400, he was one of the jailers of the deposed King Richard II at Pontefract Castle and, according to the chronicler Adam of Usk, was the main culprit in his death, starving him to death. In 1406, Thomas [II] entered the service of his half-brother Thomas Beaufort. In 1411 he tried to obtain his maternal grandfather's estate in Hainaut, but it is not known whether his efforts were successful. Towards the end of his life, Thomas [II] was forced to hand over his estates to trustees and died virtually landless on 2 April 1432. His heir, Thomas [III] Swynford, survived his father for a few years and died in 1440, leaving an underage son, Thomas [IV] (1435 – 3 May 1498). In 1468, he gave Kettlethorpe and Colby to his uncle William Swynford, who died no later than 1483, after which the estates returned to Thomas [IV]. He died without heirs in 1498, and with him the male line of descendants of Hugh Swynford and Katherine died out. The Swynford ancestral domains of Kettlethorpe and Colby were eventually inherited by the descendants of Margaret Swynford, sister of Thomas [IV], by her marriage to Thomas Pouncefot.

Katherine's older brother, Walter de Roet (born no later than 1338–1340), since May 1355 was in the service of Edward the Black Prince, King Edward III's heir. It is possible that in 1356 he participated in the Battle of Poitiers, but after this mention of him disappears. Alison Weir suggests that he could have died in battle. In any case, Walter predeceased Katherine, leaving no heirs; that is why his nephew Thomas [II] Swynford claimed his possessions in Hainaut in 1411.

== Appearance ==
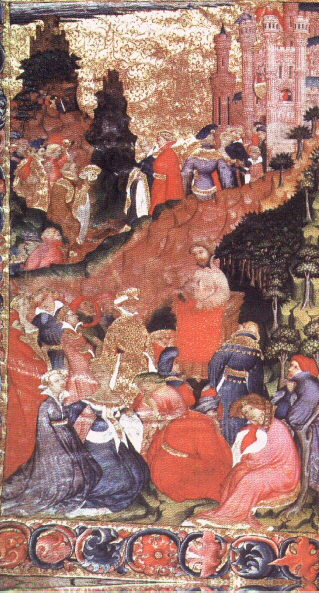
Geoffrey Chaucer reciting Troylus and Criseyde: early 15th-century manuscript of the work. Currently at Corpus Christi College, Cambridge.

An epitaph on John of Gaunt's tomb, destroyed in the Great Fire of London in 1666, described Katherine as "extraordinarily beautiful and feminine". At the same time, the epitaph itself was created during the restoration of the tomb by King Henry VII, a descendant of Katherine and John of Gaunt, who sought to restore the good reputation of his ancestor. It is possible that he emphasized beauty because Katherine was mostly remembered for it; it is possible that such a record was in Katherine's original tomb.

There are no lifetime portraits of Katherine. The only image close to her lifetime was a rough sketch made by William Dugdale in the 17th century from a now lost copper image from her tomb in Lincoln Cathedral. However, it is not a portrait, it is a formalized drawing of a woman wearing the wimple of a widow. Also in Canterbury Cathedral are two tiny carved heads no larger than a walnut, made around 1400. They are sometimes considered to be images of John of Gaunt and Katherine Swynford, but this identification, according to Alison Weir, is rather doubtful. Although two of the sons of John of Gaunt were buried in the cathedral, this happened after the creation of the carvings.

While John of Gaunt's face was long and lean, with an aquiline nose (a distinctive feature inherited by some of his descendants), Katherine's children had round or oval faces, a trait which Alison Weir believes they may have inherited from their mother.

The frontispiece to an early 15th-century manuscript of the epic poem Troilus and Criseyde by Geoffrey Chaucer depicts the poet reading it to the royal court of King Richard II. The identities of the courtiers depicted in the illustration are the subject of controversy among researchers. One of the courtiers depicted is probably John of Gaunt. It has been suggested that one of the seated women, dressed in a flowing blue dress with dangling sleeves (known as houppelande), with a wide collar trimmed with white cloth, and a golden belt, is Katherine Swynford. She has a round face with a high forehead and blond hair braided high above each temple, wrapped in a ribbon around the crown of her head. However, this hypothesis has problems. The poem was probably written between 1385 and 1388. However, the manuscript itself was created only at the beginning of the 15th century, so it must depict the ladies of the court, who played an important role at the end of the reign of King Richard II. According to Alison Weir, a woman in a blue dress is too young to be Katherine. The researcher suggested that it could be her daughter Joan Beaufort, since she looks like her image in her tomb. Next to this figure is a lady wearing a tight blue dress trimmed with gold trimmed ermine, who is traditionally identified with Joan of Kent, mother of King Richard II, but she died in 1385. Weir thinks that lady might be Katherine Swynford. In the 15th century this manuscript belonged to Anne Neville, Countess of Stafford, daughter of Joan Beaufort; it is possible that it was made specifically for her, who later bequeathed it to her own daughter.

If Alison Weir's identification is correct, Katherine was a fair-haired and buxom woman with a narrow waist and wide hips. She had a long neck, a round face with a high forehead. Her hair is elegantly combed up and pinned up under a golden crown, hinting at her high position.

== Personality ==
The monastic chroniclers, who were shocked by John of Gaunt's association with Katherine Swynford, mostly criticised her harshly. That being said, neither Thomas Walsingham nor the author of the Anonymous Chronicle likely encountered her personally. At the same time, the chronicler Henry of Knighton was a monk at Leicester Abbey who was patronized by John of Gaunt and who may have met Katherine, does not report anything wrong about her. Based on fragmentary sources, Alison Weir concludes that Katherine was "an attractive, charming and sympathetic woman, quite pious". Her long affair with John of Gaunt likely suggests that she remained faithful to him, but she may also have been assertive and ambitious while enjoying material possessions. However, according to Weir, most likely Katherine was not guided by selfish considerations: despite long separations, social ostracism and denigration by society, her love for the Duke has stood the test of time. In addition, she obviously had a strong character, prudence, tact and was quite wise. Katherine valued family ties and she was not indifferent to the opinions of others.

The respect that Katherine enjoyed in the royal family probably indicates that she was quite skilled in court duties, had exquisite taste, was sociable, polite, literate, intelligent and, most likely, was a good conversationalist.

== Coat of arms ==
The coat of arms of Katherine Swynford was three gold wheels on a red field, however, judging by the heraldic emblems on the vestments given to her by Lincoln Cathedral, her coat of arms until 1396, when she married John of Gaunt, had three simple silver wheels; she probably inherited this coat of arms from her father.

Coat of arms of Katherine Swynford as Duchess of Lancaster, after her marriage to John of Gaunt in 1396.

After her marriage with the Duke of Lancaster in 1396, Katherine change her coat of arms, adding three gold Catherine wheels ("roet" means "little wheel" in Old French) on a red field. The wheel emblem shows Katherine's devotion to her patron saint, Catherine of Alexandria, also known as Saint Catherine of the Wheel, who was also associated with royalty and virtue. In addition, judging by the seal of Katherine, created around 1397 after her marriage, her coat of arms not only depicted three silver wheels on a red background but combined with the coat of arms of her husband, representing the heads of three golden boars on a black chevron on a silver field. This coat of arms is not found anywhere else.

== In history and art ==
Anil de Silva, author of a study on John of Gaunt, believes that Katherine could be the prototype for the beautiful Virginia, the heroine of "The Physician's Tale", which is part of Geoffrey Chaucer's The Canterbury Tales.

During the Wars of the Roses in the 1470s, the exiled Henry, Earl of Richmond, whose mother belonged to the House of Beaufort, became the Lancastrian pretender to the throne. Although Henry IV deprived the Beauforts of the right to the throne, their rights at that time began to be taken quite seriously. After Richard III became king in 1483, he publicly declared that Henry had no right to the throne, since the Beauforts were descended from "double adultery" (from the connection of John of Gaunt and Katherine Swynford), which was accepted by many as a fact. But after the Earl of Richmond became King of England under the name of Henry VII, the notoriety of Katherine Swynford faded. At the same time, she is practically not mentioned in the chronicles of the Tudor era and did not appear in the royal family tree. When in 1520 a theatrical performance was given in Leadenhall in honor of Charles V, Holy Roman Emperor, an actor portraying John of Gaunt (of whom the Emperor himself was a descendant), sat near a tree from which many branches grew, representing the many Kings and Queens who were his descendants. However, Katherine, who was the ancestor of some of them, was not mentioned.

For centuries, Katherine Swynford was treated with disdain, considered immoral, and seldom mentioned as the progenitor of the House of Tudor. Interest in her arose in 1954, when the biographical novel of the American writer Anya Seton, Katherine was published. As noted by the British writer Philippa Gregory, it is considered Seton's most famous work. The novel tells in sufficient detail the biography of Katherine, and Seton collected materials for the novel for four years, traveling all over England. However, as Alison Weir (on which the novel had a huge impact) notes, this work is primarily a novel about the ideal romantic heroine – beautiful, sensual and loving, and Seton gave Katherine many moral, emotional, and psychological qualities and cultural aspects from her own life. The release of Seton's novel made the public empathize with this heroine and treat her more sympathetically. Later, the novel was repeatedly reprinted. (Note: There are English-language editions of 1981, 1991, 2000, 2004, 2006 and 2013. In 1994, the book was also published in Russian language.) In 2003 it was ranked 95th in the BBC's The Big Read survey.

Jeannette Lucraft's biographical novel Katherine Swynford: The History of a Medieval Mistress was published in 2006. The biography of Katherine was studied in detail by the historian Alison Weir, who published the work Katherine Swynford: The story of John of Gaunt and his Scandalous Duchess in 2007.

== Issue ==
Katherine's children by Sir Hugh Swynford were:

- Blanche Swynford (ca. 1363 – ca. 1375).
- (?) Margaret Swynford (ca. 1364 – ?), a nun at Barking Abbey in 1377.
- (?) Dorothy Swynford (ca. 1366 – ?), married Thomas Thymelby of Pulham near Horncastle (died 1390), Sheriff of Lincolnshire in 1380.
- Sir Thomas [II] Swynford (4 February 1367 – 2 April 1432), owner of Colby and Kettlethorpe from 1371, Sheriff of Lincolnshire from 1401 to 1402.

Katherine's children by John of Gaunt were:

- John Beaufort (ca. 1372/1373 – 16 March 1410), 1st Earl of Somerset from 1397, 1st Marquess of Somerset and 1st Marquess of Dorset from 1397 to 1399, Constable of England from 1404; legitimized in February 1397.
- Henry Beaufort (ca. 1375–1447), Bishop of Lincoln from 1398 to 1404, Bishop of Winchester from 1404, Cardinal Protopriest from 1426; legitimized in February 1397.
- Joan Beaufort (ca. 1377 – 13 November 1440), married firstly Robert Ferrers of Wem and secondly Ralph Neville, 4th Baron Neville of Raby from 1388 and 1st Earl of Westmorland from 1397; legitimized in February 1397.
- Thomas Beaufort (ca. January 1381 – 27 December 1426), 1st Earl of Dorset from 1411, 1st Duke of Exeter from 1416, 1st Baron Lillebon and Comte d'Harcourt from 1418; legitimized in February 1397.

== Bibliography ==
- Armitage-Smith, Sydney (1905). John of Gaunt: King of Castile and Leon, Duke of Aquitaine and Lancaster, Earl of Derby, Lincoln, and Leicester, Seneschal of England. New York: Charles Scribner's Sons.
- Kelley, David H; Stone; Don C; & Dearborn, David C, "Among the Royal Servants: Welby, Browne, Quarles and Related Families", Foundations (Foundation for Medieval Genealogy), Vol. 3, No. 4
- Lucraft, Jeannette (2006). Katherine Swynford: The History of a Medieval Mistress. Sutton Publishing Ltd. ISBN 978-0-750-93261-5.
- Norwich, John (2012). History of England and Shakespeare's kings. Translated by I. V. Lobanova (to Russian). Moscow: AST. ISBN 978-5-271-43630-7.
- Perry, Judy, "Katherine Roet's Swynfords: a re-examination of interfamily relationships and descent", Foundations (Foundation for Medieval Genealogy), Vol. 1, No. 1 & 2 2003–2004.
- Sargeant, Carol (2009). Love, Honour and Royal Blood Book One: Katharine Swynford. Dog Ear Publishing. ISBN 978-1-60844-162-4.
- Walker, Simon (2004a). "Katherine [née Katherine Roelt; married name Katherine Swynford], duchess of Lancaster". Oxford Dictionary of National Biography (online) (online ed.). Oxford University Press. doi:10.1093/ref:odnb/26858. (Subscription, Wikipedia Library access or UK public library membership required.)
- Walker, Simon (2004b). "John [John of Gaunt], duke of Aquitaine and duke of Lancaster, styled king of Castile and León". Oxford Dictionary of National Biography (online) (online ed.). Oxford University Press. doi:10.1093/ref:odnb/14843. (Subscription, Wikipedia Library access or UK public library membership required.)
- Weir, Alison (2007). Katherine Swynford: The story of John of Gaunt and his Scandalous Duchess. London: Vintage Books. ISBN 978-0-7126-4197-5.
- Weir, Alison (2010). Mistress of the Monarchy: The Life of Katherine Swynford, Duchess of Lancaster. New York: Ballantine Books. ISBN 978-0-3454-5324-2.
