= John of Gaunt =

English prince and regent (1340–1399)

- Duke of Lancaster
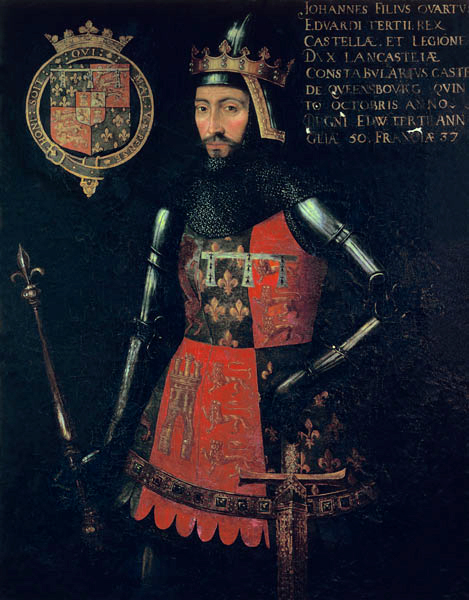
- A portrait commissioned c. 1593 by Sir Edward Hoby for Queenborough Castle, Kent, probably modelled on Gaunt's tomb effigy in Old St Paul's Cathedral.

Duke of Aquitaine
- Reign: 2 March 1390 – 3 February 1399
- Predecessor: Richard II

King of Castile
- Claimed: 29 January 1372 – 8 July 1388
- Predecessor: Henry II
- Successor: John I
- Born: 6 March 1340; Saint Bavo's Abbey, Ghent, Flanders
- Died: 3 February 1399 (aged 58); Leicester Castle, Leicestershire, England
- Burial: 15 March 1399; St Paul's Cathedral, London
- Spouses: Blanche of Lancaster (m. 1359; died 1368) Constance of Castile (m. 1371; died 1394) Katherine Swynford (m. 1396)
- Issue more...: Philippa, Queen of Portugal; Elizabeth, Duchess of Exeter; Henry IV, King of England; John, Earl of Somerset; Catherine, Queen of Castile; Henry, Bishop of Winchester; Thomas, Duke of Exeter; Joan, Countess of Westmorland
- House: Plantagenet (by birth); Lancaster (founder)
- Father: Edward III of England
- Mother: Philippa of Hainault
- Military career
- Allegiance: Kingdom of England
- Service: 1367–1388
- Conflicts: Hundred Years' War: Siege of Limoges (1370); John of Gaunt's chevauchée of 1373; Siege of Saint-Malo (1378); Castilian Civil War: Battle of Nájera (1367)

John of Gaunt, Duke of Lancaster (6 March 1340 – 3 February 1399), was an English prince, military leader and statesman. He was the fourth son (third surviving) of King Edward III, and the father of King Henry IV. Because of Gaunt's royal origin, advantageous marriages and some generous land grants, he was one of the richest men of his era and an influential figure during the reigns of both his father and his nephew, Richard II. As Duke of Lancaster, he was the founder of the royal House of Lancaster, whose members ascended the throne after his death. His birthplace, Ghent in Flanders, then known in English as Gaunt, was the origin of his name.

John's early career was spent in France and Spain fighting in the Hundred Years' War. He made an abortive attempt to enforce a claim to the Crown of Castile that came through his second wife, Constance of Castile, and for a time styled himself as King of Castile. When Edward the Black Prince, Gaunt's elder brother and heir apparent to the ageing Edward III, became incapacitated by poor health, Gaunt assumed control of many government functions and rose to become one of the most powerful political figures in England. He was faced with military difficulties abroad and political divisions at home, and disagreements as to how to deal with these crises led to tensions between Gaunt, the English Parliament and the ruling class, making him an unpopular figure for a time. He helped forge the 1386 Anglo-Portuguese alliance, secured through the marriage of his daughter Philippa to John I of Portugal, which is still in force today.

John exercised great influence over the English throne during the minority of King Richard II (Edward the Black Prince's son) and the ensuing periods of political strife. He mediated between the king and a group of rebellious nobles, which included Gaunt's own son and heir-apparent, Henry Bolingbroke. Following Gaunt's death in 1399, the Lancastrian estates and titles were declared forfeit to the Crown, and the now disinherited son, Bolingbroke, was branded a traitor and ordered into exile. Henry did not stay in exile; he raised an army to reclaim his inheritance and depose Richard. He reigned as King Henry IV (1399–1413), the first of the descendants of John of Gaunt to hold the English throne.

John cultivated an extensive network of retainers, known as the "Lancastrian affinity", which became the cornerstone of his political power and was later inherited by his eldest surviving son, Henry, the future King Henry IV. All English monarchs from Henry IV onwards are descended from John of Gaunt. His direct male line, the House of Lancaster, ruled England from 1399 until the Wars of the Roses. Gaunt fathered additional children surnamed Beaufort (from the name of one of Lancaster's fiefs in France), by Katherine Swynford, his long-term mistress. After he married Swynford (his third marriage), his Beaufort children were later legitimised by royal and papal decrees. Through his daughter Joan Beaufort, Countess of Westmorland, he was an ancestor of the Yorkist kings Edward IV, Edward V and Richard III. Through his great-granddaughter Lady Margaret Beaufort he was also an ancestor of Henry VII, who married Edward IV's daughter Elizabeth of York, and all subsequent monarchs are descendants of their marriage. Two of John's daughters married into continental royal houses (those of Portugal and Castile). Through them, many royal families of Europe can trace lineage to him.

== Early life ==
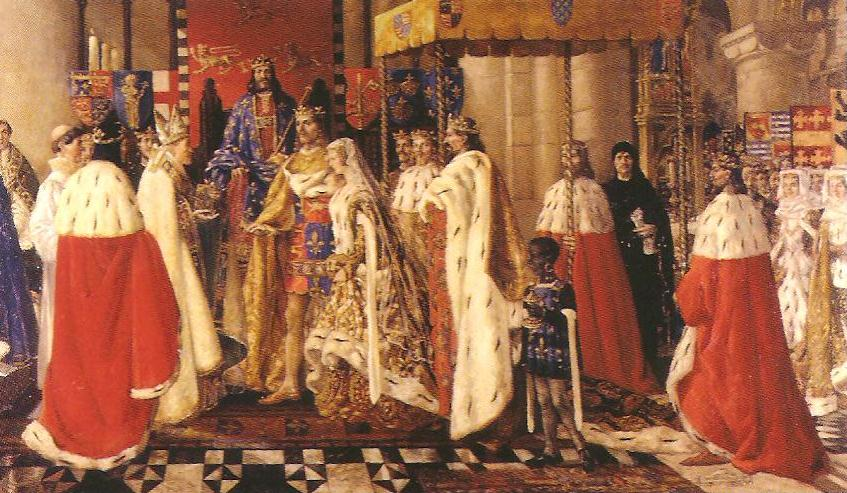
Marriage of John of Gaunt to Blanche of Lancaster at Reading Abbey in 1359: painting by Horace Wright (1914)

John was the son of Edward III of England and Philippa of Hainault, and was born in Ghent in Flanders, most likely at Saint Bavo's Abbey, in March 1340. The name by which he has become best known, of Gaunt, was derived from an anglicised form of his birthplace, Ghent. Its use was popularised by Shakespeare in his play Richard II, but during John's lifetime, he was not referred to as this after the age of three. When he became unpopular later in life, a scurrilous rumour circulated, along with lampoons, claiming that he was actually the son of a Ghent butcher.

John married his first wife, Blanche of Lancaster, in 1359 at Reading Abbey as a part of the efforts of Edward III to arrange matches for his sons with wealthy heiresses. Upon the death of his father-in-law, the Duke of Lancaster, in 1361, John received half his lands, the title "Earl of Lancaster", and thus became the greatest landowner in Northern England as heir to the Palatinate of Lancaster. He also became the 14th Baron of Halton and 11th Lord of Bowland. John inherited the rest of the Lancaster property when Blanche's sister Maud, Countess of Leicester (married to William V, Count of Hainaut), died without issue on 10 April 1362.

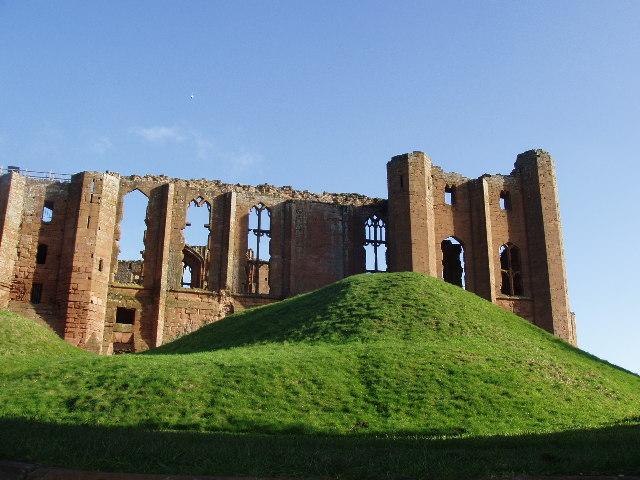
Kenilworth Castle, a massive fortress which John acquired through his marriage to Blanche of Lancaster

John received the title "Duke of Lancaster" from his father on 13 November 1362. By then well established, he owned at least thirty castles and estates across England and France and maintained a household comparable in scale and organisation to that of a monarch. He owned land in almost every county in England, a patrimony that produced a net income of between £8,000 and £10,000 a year, equivalent in 2023 to c.£170 – 213 million in income value, or £3.5 – 4.4 billion in relation to GDP.

== English magnate ==
=== First campaign in France ===
Because of his rank, John of Gaunt was one of England's principal military commanders in the 1370s and 1380s, though he did not have the kind of success that had made his elder brother Edward the Black Prince such a charismatic war leader.

On the resumption of war with France in 1369, John was sent to Calais with Humphrey de Bohun, Earl of Hereford, and a small English army with which he raided into northern France. On 23 August, he was confronted by a much larger French army under Philip the Bold, Duke of Burgundy. Exercising his first command, John dared not attack such a superior force and the two armies faced each other across a marsh for several weeks until the English were reinforced by the Thomas de Beauchamp, Earl of Warwick, at which the French withdrew without offering battle. John and Warwick then decided to strike Harfleur, the base of the French fleet on the Seine. Further reinforced by German mercenaries, they marched on Harfleur, but were delayed by French guerilla operations while the town prepared for a siege. John invested the town for four days in October, but he was losing so many men to dysentery and bubonic plague that he decided to abandon the siege and return to Calais. During this retreat, the army had to fight its way across the Somme at the ford of Blanchetaque against a French army led by Hugh de Châtillon, who was captured and sold to Edward III. By the middle of November, the survivors of the sickly army returned to Calais, where the Earl of Warwick died of the plague. Though it seemed an inglorious conclusion to the campaign, John had forced the French king, Charles V, to abandon his plans to invade England that autumn.

In the summer of 1370, John was sent with a small army to Aquitaine to reinforce his ailing elder brother, the Black Prince, and his younger brother Edmund of Langley, Earl of Cambridge. With them, he participated in the Siege of Limoges (September 1370). He took charge of the siege operations and engaged in hand-to-hand fighting in the undermining tunnels. After this event, the Black Prince gave John the lieutenancy of Aquitaine and sailed for England, leaving John in charge. Though he attempted to defend the duchy against French encroachment for nearly a year, lack of resources and money meant he could do little but husband what small territory the English still controlled, and he resigned the command in September 1371 and returned to England. Just before leaving Aquitaine, he married the Infanta Constance of Castile in September 1371 at Roquefort, near Bordeaux. The following year he took part in an abortive attempt with his father, Edward III, to invade France with a large army, which was frustrated by three months of unfavourable winds.

Probably John's most notable feat of arms occurred in August–December 1373, when he attempted to relieve Aquitaine by the landward route, leading an army of some 9,000 mounted men from Calais on a great chevauchée from northeastern to southwestern France on a 900-kilometre raid. This four-month ride through enemy territory, evading French armies on the way, was a bold stroke that impressed contemporaries but achieved virtually nothing. Beset on all sides by French ambushes and plagued by disease and starvation, John of Gaunt and his raiders battled their way through Champagne, east of Paris, into Burgundy, across the Massif Central, and finally down into Dordogne. Unable to attack any strongly fortified forts and cities, the raiders plundered the countryside, which weakened the French infrastructure, but the military value of the damage was only temporary. Marching in winter across the Limousin plateau, with stragglers being picked off by the French, huge numbers of the army, and even larger numbers of horses, died of cold, disease or starvation. The army reached English-occupied Bordeaux on 24 December 1373, severely weakened in numbers with the loss of at least one-third of their force in action and another third to disease. Upon arrival in Bordeaux, many more succumbed to the bubonic plague that was raging in the city. Sick, demoralised and mutinous, the army was in no shape to defend Aquitaine, and soldiers began to desert. John had no funds with which to pay them, and despite his entreaties, none were sent from England, so in April 1374, he abandoned the enterprise and sailed for home.

=== Head of government ===
On his return from France in 1374, John took a more decisive and persistent role in the direction of English foreign policy. From then until 1377, he was effectively the head of the English government owing to the illness of his father and elder brother, who were unable to exercise authority. His vast estates made him the richest man in England, and his great wealth, ostentatious display of it, autocratic manner and attitudes, enormous London mansion (the Savoy Palace on the Strand) and association with the failed peace process at Bruges combined to make him the most visible target of social resentments.

However, John's ascendancy to political power coincided with widespread resentment of his influence. At a time when English forces encountered setbacks in the Hundred Years' War against France, with John's efforts not viewed as being as successful as his father and brother, and when Edward III's rule was becoming unpopular owing to high taxation and his affair with his mistress Alice Perrers, political opinion closely associated the Duke of Lancaster with the failing government of the 1370s.

The Good Parliament was called in 1376 due to shortages of government funds. It turned into a parliamentary revolution, expressing grievances at high taxation, misgovernment and corruption at court. With the Black Prince supporting reform, John was isolated; the Commons managed to get the great officers of state dismissed, and Alice Perrers was barred from the court. This situation changed with the Black Prince's death on 8 June 1376; and the onset of Edward III's last illness at the closing of the Good Parliament on 10 July left John with all the reins of power.

John immediately had the ailing king grant royal pardons to all the officials impeached by the Parliament; Alice Perrers too was reinstated at the heart of the king's household. John impeached William of Wykeham and other leaders of the reform movement, and secured their conviction on old or trumped-up charges.

The Bad Parliament of 1377 was John's counter-coup: crucially, the Lords no longer supported the Commons and John was able to have most of the acts of 1376 annulled. He also succeeded in forcing the Commons to agree to the imposition of the first poll tax in English history—a viciously regressive measure that bore hardest on the poorest members of society.

Gaunt protected the religious dissenter John Wycliffe, so staking out a more anti-clerical position than his contemporaries at least partly in order to threaten the clergy into paying higher taxes. Wycliffe believed that church wealth was damaging to the church, which coincided with Gaunt's views that church wealth could fund the government's military needs.

=== Richard II's early reign ===
John's influence strengthened with Edward III's death in 1377 and the accession of Edward the Black Prince's ten-year-old son Richard II.

Organised opposition rose up against his measures, and there was rioting in London in 1377; John of Gaunt's arms were reversed or defaced wherever they were displayed, and protestors pasted up lampoons on his supposedly dubious birth. At one point he was forced to take refuge across the Thames, while his Savoy Palace only just escaped looting. It was rumoured (and believed by many people in England and France) that he intended to seize the throne for himself and supplant the rightful heir, his nephew Richard, the son of the Black Prince, but there seems to have been no truth in this; and on the death of Edward III and the accession of the child Richard II, John sought no position of regency for himself and withdrew to his estates.

John's personal unpopularity persisted, however, and the failure of his expedition to Saint-Malo in 1378 did nothing for his reputation. Ultimately, some of his possessions were taken from him by the Crown. In 1380, his ship, the Dieulagarde, was seized and bundled with other royal ships to be sold to pay off the debts of Sir Robert de Crull, who during the latter part of Edward III's reign had been the Clerk of the King's Ships, and had advanced monies to pay for the king's ships. During the Peasants' Revolt of 1381, John was on the March of Scotland, and thus far from the centre of events, but he was among those named by the rebels as a traitor to be beheaded as soon as he could be found. The Savoy Palace was systematically destroyed by the mob and burned to the ground. Nominally friendly lords and even his own fortresses closed their gates to him, and John was forced to flee into Scotland with a handful of retainers and throw himself on the charity of King Robert II of Scotland until the crisis was over.

=== Second campaign in France ===
John's final campaign in France took place in 1378. He planned a 'great expedition' of mounted men in a large armada of ships to land at Brest and take control of Brittany. Not enough ships could be found to transport the horses, and the expedition was tasked with the more limited objective of capturing St. Malo. The English destroyed the shipping in St. Malo harbour and began to assault the town by land on 14 August, but John was soon hampered by the size of his army, which was unable to forage because French armies under Olivier de Clisson and Bertrand du Guesclin occupied the surrounding countryside, harrying the edges of his force. In September, the siege was simply abandoned and the army returned ingloriously to England. John received most of the blame for the debâcle.

Partly as a result of these failures, and those of other English commanders at this period, John was one of the first important figures in England to conclude that the war with France was unwinnable because of France's greater resources of wealth and manpower. He began to advocate peace negotiations; indeed, as early as 1373, during his great raid through France, he made contact with Guillaume Roger, brother and political adviser of Pope Gregory XI, to let the pope know he would be interested in a diplomatic conference under papal auspices. This approach led indirectly to the Anglo-French Congress of Bruges in 1374–77, which resulted in the short-lived Truce of Bruges between the two sides. John was himself a delegate to the various conferences that eventually resulted in the Truce of Leulinghem in 1389. The fact that he became identified with the attempts to make peace added to his unpopularity at a period when the majority of Englishmen believed victory would be in their grasp if only the French could be defeated decisively as they had been in the 1350s. Another motive was John's conviction that it was only by making peace with France would it be possible to release sufficient manpower to enforce his claim to the throne of Castile.

=== Peasants' Revolt ===
As de facto ruler during Richard's minority, he made unwise decisions on taxation that led to the Peasants' Revolt in 1381, when the rebels destroyed his home in London, the Savoy Palace. Some of the rebels suspected John of wanting to seize the throne himself, with rebels swearing "that they would accept no king called John", although he took pains to ensure that he never became associated with the opposition to Richard's kingship. Unlike some of Richard's unpopular advisors, John was away from London at the time of the uprising and thus avoided the direct wrath of the rebels.

=== Rehabilitation ===
In 1386 John left England to seek the throne of Castile, claimed in jure uxoris by right of his second wife, Constance of Castile, whom he had married in 1371. However, crisis ensued almost immediately in his absence, and in 1387 King Richard's misrule brought England to the brink of civil war. John had to give up on his ambitions in Spain and hurry back to England in 1389. Only John's intervention in the political crisis succeeded in persuading the Lords Appellant and King Richard to compromise to usher in a period of relative stability. During the 1390s, John's reputation of devotion to the well-being of the kingdom was largely restored.

== King of Castile ==
Upon his marriage to Constance of Castile in 1371, John assumed (officially from 29 January 1372) the title of King of Castile and León in right of his wife, and insisted his fellow English nobles henceforth address him as "my lord of Spain". John gathered around himself a small court of refugee Castilian knights and set up a Castilian chancery that prepared documents in his name. His claim to the Castilan throne strongly influenced Gaunt's views on foreign policy. He hatched several schemes to make good his claim, but for many years these were still-born owing to lack of finance or the conflicting claims of war in France or with Scotland.

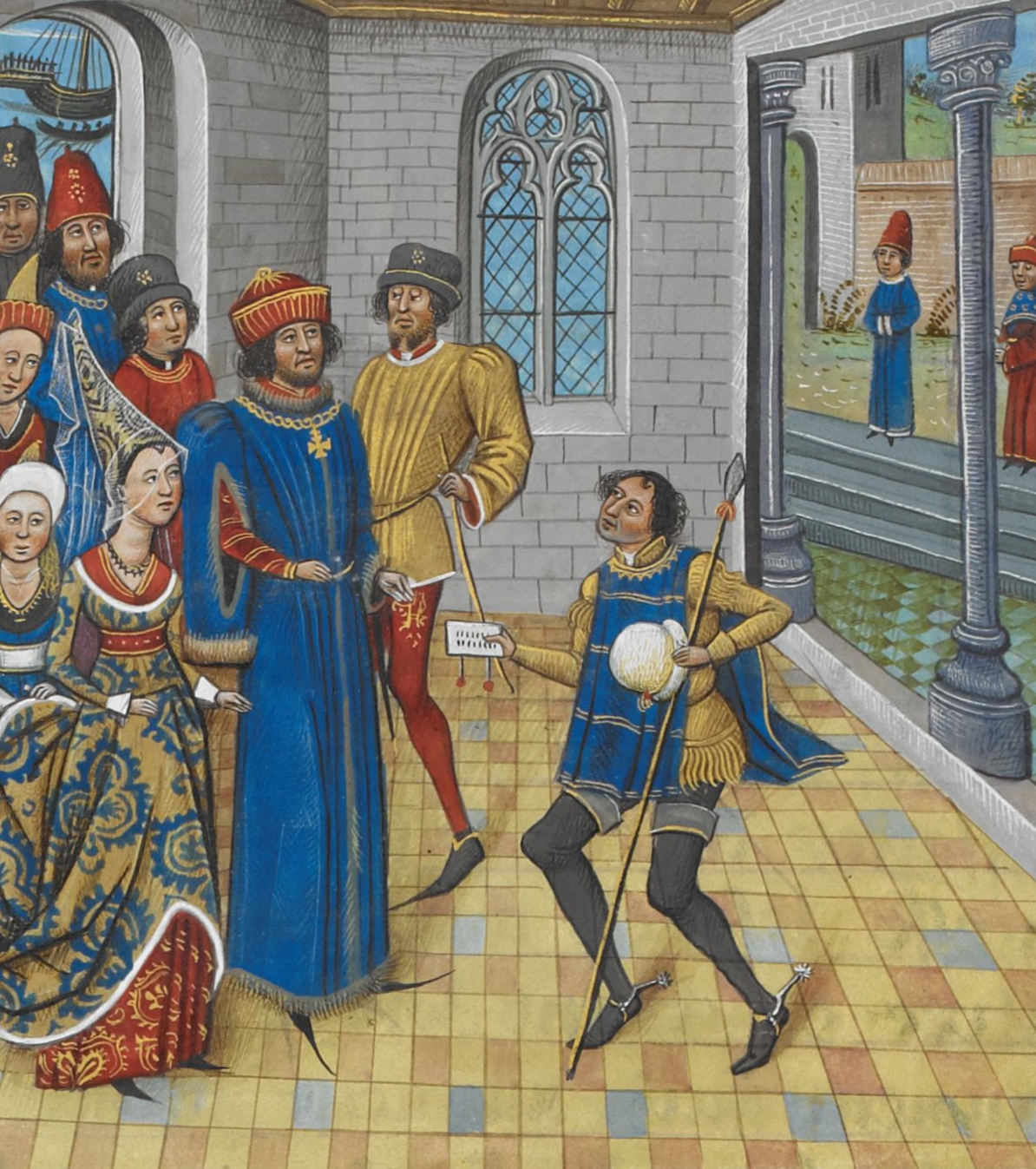
John of Gaunt, Duke of Lancaster, arrives at Galicia, and receives a letter from the King of Portugal, John I

It was not until 1386, after Portugal's new King John I had entered into an alliance with England, that he was actually able to land with an army in Spain. John's Anglo-Portuguese fleet sailed from England in 1386, pausing to drive off the French forces who were then besieging Brest, he landed at Corunna in northern Spain on 29 July.

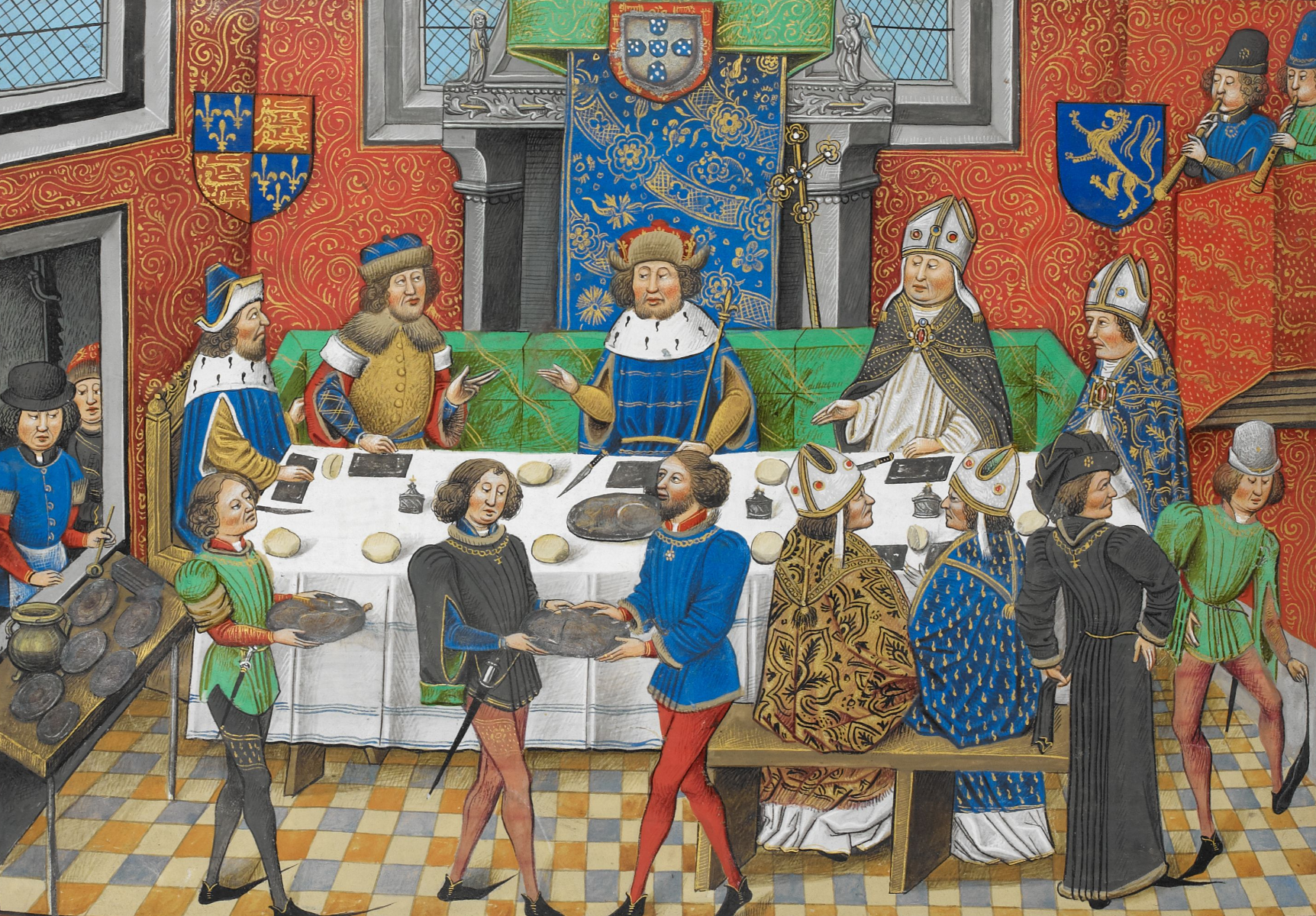
John of Gaunt dines with John I of Portugal, to discuss a joint Anglo-Portuguese invasion of Castile (from Jean de Wavrin's Chronique d'Angleterre)

The Castilian king, John of Trastámara, had concentrated his forces on the Portuguese border but was wrong-footed by John's decision to invade Galicia setting up a rudimentary court and chancery at Ourense and receiving the submission of the Galician nobility and most of the towns. The Castilians were in no hurry to fight and Gaunt began had difficulties paying his army.

In November, Gaunt and John of Portugal concluded an agreement for a joint Anglo-Portuguese invasion of central Castile early in 1387 sealed by the marriage of John's eldest daughter Philippa to the Portuguese king. As much of John's army fell sick they were far outnumbered by their Portuguese allies by the time of the invasion in April–June 1387 which failed as the Castilians avoided battle and the invaders were reduced to foraging for food in the arid Spanish landscape while being harried by French mercenaries. Gaunt lost a number of retainers and close friends to disease or exhaustion, while many of his troops abandoned the army to ride north under French safe conducts. Shortly after the army returned to Portugal, John of Gaunt concluded a secret treaty with John of Trastámara under which he renounced all claims to the throne in return for a large annual payment and the marriage of his daughter Catherine to John of Trastámara's son, Henry.

== Duke of Aquitaine ==
John left Portugal for Aquitaine, and he remained in that province until he returned to England in November 1389. This effectively kept him off the scene while England endured the major political crisis of the conflict between Richard II and the Lords Appellant, who were led by John of Gaunt's younger brother Thomas of Woodstock, Duke of Gloucester. Only four months after his return to England, in March 1390, Richard II formally invested Gaunt with the Duchy of Aquitaine, thus providing him with the overseas territory he had long desired. However, he did not immediately return to the province, but remained in England and mainly ruled through seneschals as an absentee duke. His administration of the province was a disappointment, and his appointment as duke was much resented by the Gascons, since Aquitaine had previously always been held directly by the king of England or his heir; it was not felt to be a fief that a king could bestow on a subordinate.

From 1394 through 1395, he was forced to spend nearly a year in Gascony to shore up his position in the face of threats of secession by the Gascon nobles. He was one of England's principal negotiators in the diplomatic exchanges with France in 1396, and he initially agreed to join the French-led Crusade that ended in the disastrous Battle of Nicopolis, but withdrew because of ill-health and the political problems in Gascony and England.

For the remainder of his life, John of Gaunt occupied the role of valued counsellor of the king and loyal supporter of the Crown. He did not even protest, it seems, when his younger brother Thomas was murdered at Richard's behest. It may be that he felt he had to maintain this posture of loyalty to protect his son Henry Bolingbroke (the future Henry IV), who had also been one of the Lords Appellant, from Richard's wrath; but, in 1398, Richard had Bolingbroke exiled, and on John of Gaunt's death the next year he disinherited Bolingbroke completely, seizing John's vast estates for the Crown.

== Relationship with Geoffrey Chaucer ==
John of Gaunt was a patron and close friend of the poet Geoffrey Chaucer, best known for his work The Canterbury Tales. Near the end of their lives, Lancaster and Chaucer became brothers-in-law. Chaucer married Philippa (Pan) de Roet in 1366, and Lancaster took his mistress of nearly 30 years, Katherine Swynford (de Roet), who was Philippa Chaucer's sister, as his third wife in 1396. Although Philippa died c. 1387, the men were bound as brothers and Lancaster's children by Katherine—John, Henry, Thomas and Joan Beaufort—were Chaucer's nephews and niece.

Chaucer's The Book of the Duchess, also known as the Deeth of Blaunche the Duchesse, was written in commemoration of Blanche of Lancaster, John of Gaunt's first wife. The poem refers to John and Blanche in allegory as the narrator relates the tale of "A long castel with walles white/Be Seynt Johan, on a ryche hil" (1318–1319) who is mourning grievously after the death of his love, "And goode faire White she het/That was my lady name ryght" (948–949). The phrase "long castel" is a reference to Lancaster (also called "Loncastel" and "Longcastell"), "walles white" is thought to likely be an oblique reference to Blanche, "Seynt Johan" was John of Gaunt's name-saint, and "ryche hil" is a reference to Richmond; these thinly veiled references reveal the identity of the grieving black knight of the poem as John of Gaunt, Duke of Lancaster and Earl of Richmond. "White" is the English translation of the French word "blanche", implying that the white lady was Blanche of Lancaster.

Believed to have been written in the 1390s, Chaucer's short poem Fortune, is also inferred to directly reference Lancaster. "Chaucer as narrator" openly defies Fortune, proclaiming he has learned who his enemies are through her tyranny and deceit, and declares "my suffisaunce" (15) and that "over himself hath the maystrye" (14). Fortune, in turn, does not understand Chaucer's harsh words to her for she believes she has been kind to him, claims that he does not know what she has in store for him in the future, but most importantly, "And eek thou hast thy beste frend alyve" (32, 40, 48). Chaucer retorts that "My frend maystow nat reven, blind goddesse" (50) and orders her to take away those who merely pretend to be his friends. Fortune turns her attention to three princes whom she implores to relieve Chaucer of his pain and "Preyeth his beste frend of his noblesse/That to som beter estat he may atteyne" (78–79). The three princes are believed to represent the dukes of Lancaster, York, and Gloucester, and a portion of line 76, "as three of you or tweyne," to refer to the ordinance of 1390 which specified that no royal gift could be authorised without the consent of at least two of the three dukes. Most conspicuous in this short poem is the number of references to Chaucer's "beste frend". Fortune states three times in her response to the plaintiff, "And also, you still have your best friend alive" (32, 40, 48); she also references his "beste frend" in the envoy when appealing to his "noblesse" to help Chaucer to a higher estate. A fifth reference is made by "Chaucer as narrator" who rails at Fortune that she shall not take his friend from him. While the envoy playfully hints to Lancaster that Chaucer would certainly appreciate a boost to his status or income, the poem Fortune distinctively shows his deep appreciation and affection for John of Gaunt.

== Death ==
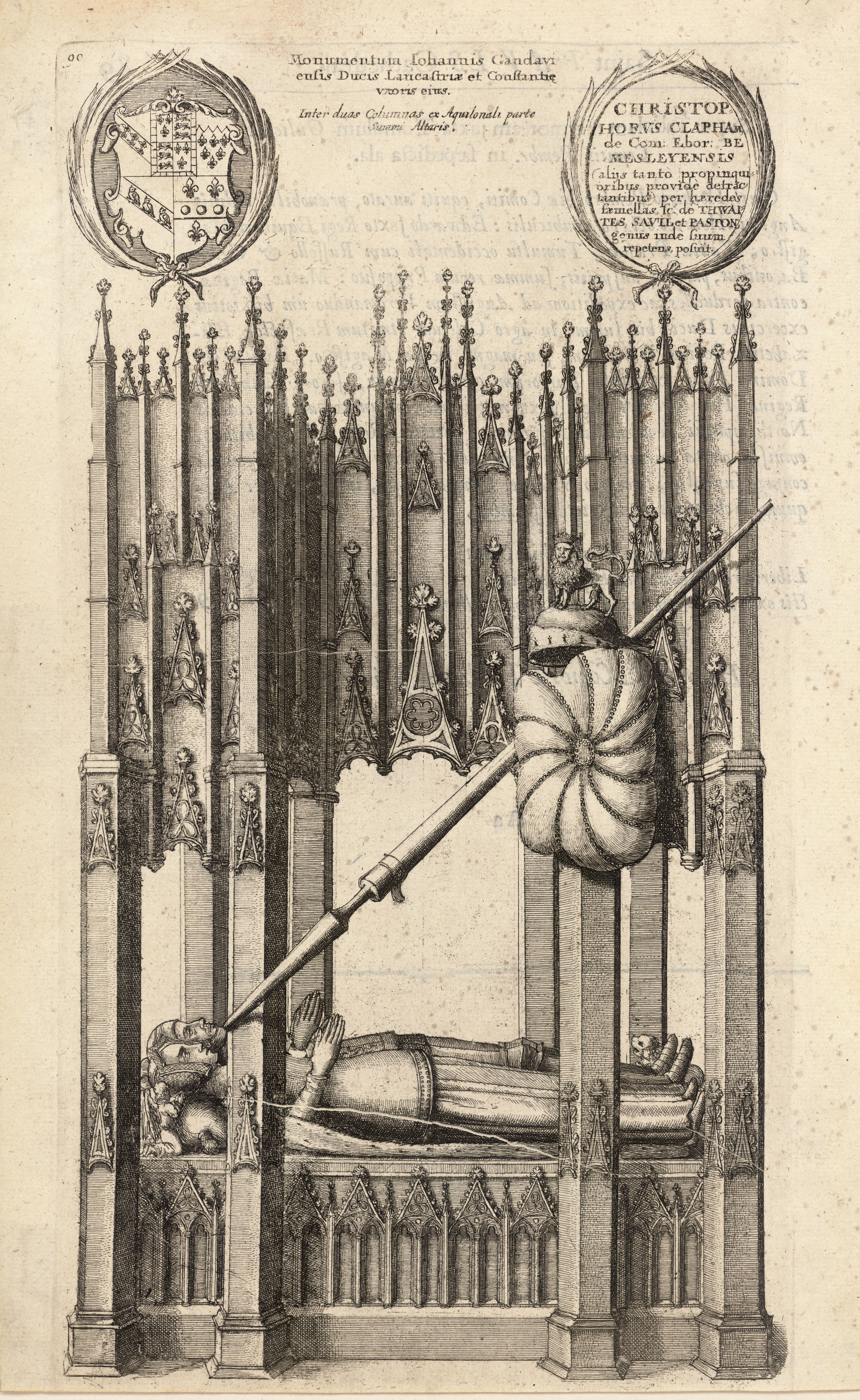
The tomb of Gaunt and Blanche of Lancaster in St. Paul's Cathedral, as represented in an etching of 1658 by Wenceslaus Hollar. The etching includes a number of inaccuracies, for example in not showing the couple with joined hands.

John of Gaunt died of natural causes on 3 February 1399 at Leicester Castle, with his third wife Katherine by his side.

He was buried beside his first wife, Blanche of Lancaster, in the choir of St Paul's Cathedral, adjacent to the high altar. Their magnificent tomb had been designed and executed between 1374 and 1380 by Henry Yevele with the assistance of Thomas Wrek, at a total cost of £592. The two alabaster effigies were notable for having their right hands joined. An adjacent chantry chapel was added between 1399 and 1403. During the reformation when other stonework in the cathedral was taken down in 1552, the tomb was spared by a command of the Privy Council, but was stripped plain. (Note: "The xxv. day of October was the pluckynge downe of alle the alteres and chappelles in alle Powlles churche, with alle the toumes, at the commandment of the byshoppe then beynge Nicolas Rydley, and alle the goodly stoneworke that stode behynde the hye alter, and the place for the prest, dekyne, and subdekyne; and wolde a pullyd downe John a Gauntes tome but there was a commandment [to] the contrary from the counsell, and soo yt was made alle playne as it aperes." The Chronicle of the Grey Friars of London) During the period of the Interregnum (1649–1660) it was severely damaged, and perhaps destroyed; anything that survived was lost (with the rest of the cathedral) in the Great Fire of London of 1666. A wall memorial in the crypt of the present cathedral lists Gaunt's as among the important lost monuments.

== Family ==
=== Marriages ===
Blanche of Lancaster

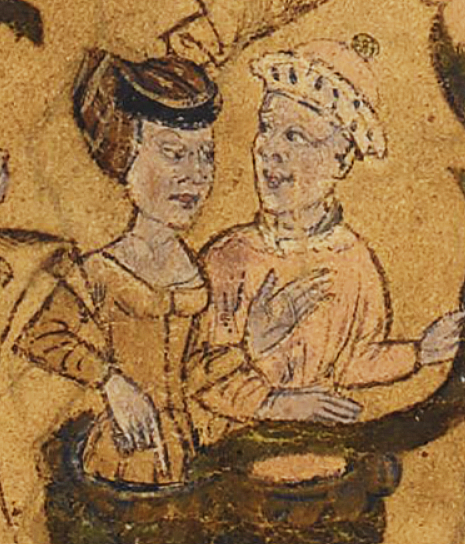
John with his first wife, Blanche of Lancaster, in a 15th-century family tree of his great-grandson, Henry VI

On 19 May 1359 at Reading Abbey, John married his third cousin, Blanche of Lancaster, younger of the two daughters of Henry of Grosmont, Duke of Lancaster. Both were great-great-grandchildren of King Henry III. The wealth she brought to the marriage was the foundation of John's fortune. Blanche died on 12 September 1368 at Tutbury Castle, shortly after the birth of her last child while her husband was overseas. Of their seven children only three survived to adulthood.

Their son Henry Bolingbroke became Henry IV of England, having deposed King Richard II, who had seized the duchy of Lancaster upon John's death while Henry was in exile. Their daughter Philippa of Lancaster became Queen of Portugal by marrying King John I of Portugal in 1387. All subsequent kings of Portugal beginning from the House of Aviz were thus descended from John of Gaunt. Philippa's daughter Isabella married Philip the Good, Duke of Burgundy. Their lone heiress, Mary, the only child of Philip's only legitimate son Charles the Bold, married her second cousin, Holy Roman Emperor Maximilian I, whose mother Eleanor, was the daughter of Philippa's son Edward. Their grandson Charles married Isabella, daughter of Manuel I of Portugal, a male-line grandson of Edward.

Constance of Castile

In 1371, John married Infanta Constance of Castile, daughter of King Peter of Castile, thus giving him a claim to the Crown of Castile, which he went on to pursue. Constance died in 1394. Though John was never able to make good his claim, his daughter by Constance, Catherine of Lancaster, became Queen of Castile by marrying Henry III of Castile. Catherine of Aragon and Joanna of Castile were descended from Catherine through their mother Isabella I, daughter of Catherine's son John II. Isabella I was also a descendant of Catherine's half-sister Philippa, through her mother Isabella, who was the daughter of Philippa's other son John. Hence, the House of Hapsburg is also related to John of Gaunt.

Katherine Swynford

During his second marriage, some time around 1373 (the approximate birth year of their eldest son, John Beaufort) John of Gaunt entered into an extra-marital love affair with Katherine Swynford (born de Roet), the daughter of an ordinary knight (Sir Paon de Roet), which would produce four children for the couple. All of them were born out of wedlock, but were legitimised upon their parents' eventual marriage. The adulterous relationship endured until 1381, when it was ended out of political necessity. Prior to her widowhood, Katherine had had at least two children with her husband, Sir Hugh Swynford from Kettlethorpe in Lincolnshire. These were Blanche, for whom John of Gaunt stood as godfather, and Thomas, later Sir Thomas.

On 13 January 1396, two years after the death of Constance of Castile, Katherine and John of Gaunt married in Lincoln Cathedral. Their children were given the surname "Beaufort" after a former French possession of the duke. The Beaufort children, three sons and a daughter, were legitimised by royal and papal decrees after John and Katherine married. From the eldest son, John, descended a granddaughter, Lady Margaret Beaufort, whose son, later King Henry VII of England, would nevertheless claim the throne.

A later proviso to the legitimation of the Beaufort children—the phrase excepta regali dignitate ("except royal status"), specifically barring them from inheriting the throne—was inserted with dubious authority by their half-brother Henry IV. However, as historian and author Nathen Amin points out, there was no parliamentary ratification of this scribbled-in amendment. Further testing and analysis on these three words is required to determine when exactly they were added. There is every possibility they were added as a later proviso during the height of the Wars of the Roses as a means to discredit any heirs of Margaret Beaufort.

=== Children ===
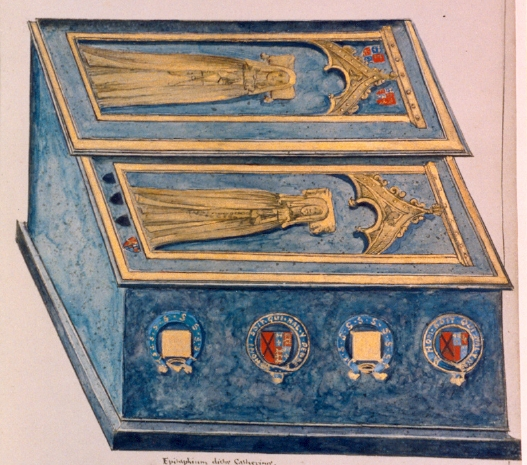
1640 drawing of tombs of Katherine Swynford and daughter Joan Beaufort, Countess of Westmorland, in Lincoln Cathedral

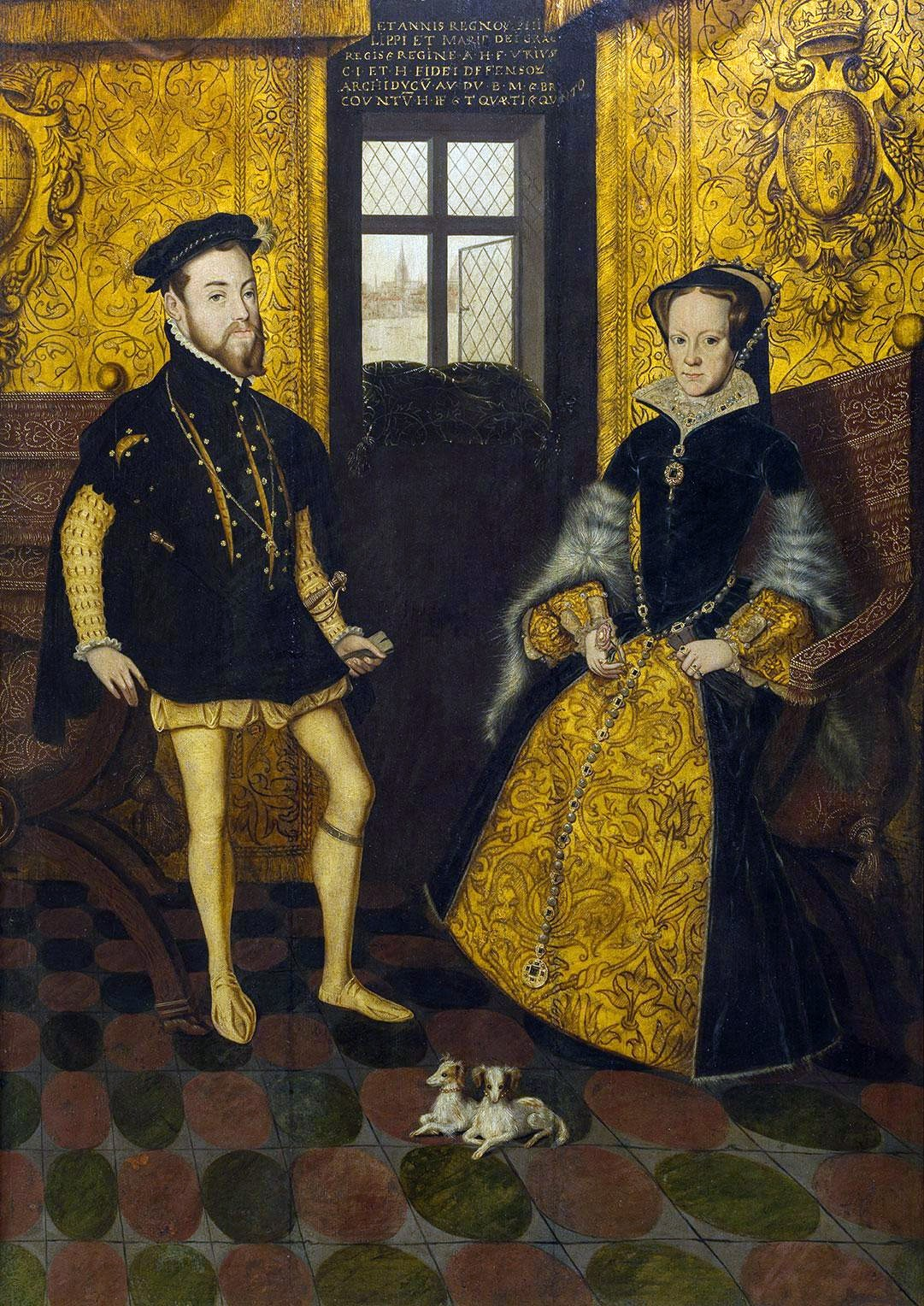
Philip II of Spain and Mary I of England (1558): both were descended from John of Gaunt—Philip through his daughter Catherine of Lancaster, and Mary through his legitimized daughter Joan Beaufort.

- By Blanche of Lancaster:
  - Philippa (1360–1415) married King John I of Portugal (1357–1433).
  - John (1362–1365) was the first-born son of John and Blanche of Lancaster and lived possibly at least until after the birth of his brother Edward of Lancaster in 1365 and died before his second brother, another short-lived boy, called John in 1366. He was buried in the Collegiate Church of the Annunciation of Our Lady of The Newarke, Leicester (the church founded by his grandfather Henry, Duke of Lancaster).
  - Elizabeth (1364–1426), married (1) in 1380 John Hastings, 3rd Earl of Pembroke (1372–1389), annulled 1383; married (2) in 1386 John Holland, 1st Duke of Exeter (1350–1400); (3) Sir John Cornwall, 1st Baron Fanhope and Milbroke (died 1443)
  - Edward (1365) died within a year of his birth and was buried in the Collegiate Church of the Annunciation of Our Lady of The Newarke, Leicester.
  - John (1366–1367) most likely died after the birth of his younger brother Henry, the future Henry IV of England; he was buried in the Collegiate Church of the Annunciation of Our Lady of The Newarke, Leicester.
  - Henry IV of England (1367–1413) married (1) Mary de Bohun (1369–1394); (2) Joanna of Navarre (1368–1437)
  - Isabel (1368–1368).
- By Constance of Castile:
  - Catherine (1373–1418), married King Henry III of Castile (1379–1406)
  - John (1374–1375)
- By Katherine Swynford (née de Roet/Roelt), mistress and later wife (children legitimised 1397):
  - John Beaufort, 1st Earl of Somerset (1373–1410), married Margaret Holland. His great-grandson was Henry VII of England.
  - Cardinal Henry Beaufort, Bishop of Winchester (1375–1447)
  - Thomas Beaufort, Duke of Exeter (1377–1427), married Margaret Neville, daughter of Sir Thomas de Neville of Hornby by an unknown wife
  - Joan Beaufort (1379–1440); married first Robert Ferrers, 5th Baron Boteler of Wem, and second Ralph Neville, 1st Earl of Westmorland
- By mistress Marie de St. Hilaire of Hainaut, a lady-in-waiting to John's mother, Queen Philippa:
  - Blanche (1359–1388/1389), who married Sir Thomas Morieux (1355–1387) in 1381 and had no children. Morieux held several important posts, including Constable of the Tower the year he was married, and Master of Horse to King Richard II two years later.

English royal families in the Wars of the Roses

Dukes (except Aquitaine) and Princes of Wales are noted, as are the monarchs' reigns.
†=Killed in action; =Executed
See also Family tree of English monarchs

Henry of Grosmont; Duke of Lancaster | Edward III; King of England r. 1327–1377
Edward of Woodstock "The Black Prince"; Prince of Wales | Thomas of Woodstock; Duke of Gloucester | Blanche of Lancaster | John of Gaunt; Duke of Lancaster | Katherine Swynford | Edmund of Langley; Duke of York | Lionel of Antwerp; Duke of Clarence
Edward of Angoulême | Richard II; Prince of Wales, King of England r. 1377–1399 | Henry IV; Duke of Lancaster, King of England r. 1399–1413 | John Beaufort | Thomas Beaufort; Duke of Exeter | Joan Beaufort | Ralph Neville | Philippa of Clarence
Owen Tudor; Lancastrian | Catherine of Valois | Henry V Duke of Lancaster, Prince of Wales, King of England r. 1413–1422 | Humphrey; Duke of Gloucester | Henry Percy "Hotspur" | Elizabeth Mortimer | Roger Mortimer
Edward of Norwich; Duke of York | Richard of Conisburgh | Anne de Mortimer
John Beaufort; Duke of Somerset; Lancastrian | Margaret of Anjou; Lancastrian | Henry VI; King of England r. 1422–1461, r. 1470–1471; Lancastrian | Edmund Beaufort; Duke of Somerset; Lancastrian †1st St Albans | William Neville; Yorkist | Anne Neville | Henry Percy; Lancastrian †1st St Albans | Eleanor Neville | Richard Neville; Yorkist; (executed) Wakefield | Cecily Neville | Richard of York; Duke of York, Prince of Wales; Yorkist †Wakefield
Henry Beaufort; Duke of Somerset; Lancastrian; (executed) Hexham | Richard Woodville; (executed) Edgecote | Edmund Beaufort; Duke of Somerset; Lancastrian; (executed) Tewkesbury | Margaret Beaufort | Humphrey Stafford | Henry Percy; Lancastrian †Towton | John Neville; Yorkist, then Lancastrian †Barnet | Richard Neville "Kingmaker"; Yorkist, then Lancastrian †Barnet
Margaret Beaufort; Lancastrian | Edmund Tudor; Lancastrian | Jasper Tudor; Duke of Bedford; Lancastrian | Catherine Woodville | Henry Stafford; Duke of Buckingham; Yorkist, then Lancastrian (executed) | Elizabeth Woodville | Edward IV; Duke of York, King of England r. 1461–1470, r. 1471–1483; Yorkist | George Plantagenet; Duke of Clarence; Yorkist, then Lancastrian; (executed) Tower | Edward of Westminster; Prince of Wales; Lancastrian †Tewkesbury | Anne Neville | Richard III; Duke of Gloucester, King of England r. 1483–1485; Yorkist †Bosworth Field
Henry VII; King of England; Lancastrian r. 1485–1509 | Elizabeth of York | Edward V Prince of Wales, King of England r. 1483; Yorkist; (executed) Tower | Richard of Shrewsbury; Duke of York; (executed) Tower

== Titles and arms ==
=== Titles and styles ===
- Earl of Richmond: granted as an infant in September 1342; surrendered to the crown in June 1372
- Earl of Leicester, Earl of Lancaster, Earl of Derby: inherited jure uxoris in November 1362, following the death of his wife's father Henry of Grosmont
- Duke of Lancaster: granted as a new creation on 13 November 1362, following the death of Henry of Grosmont, who had been the prior Duke
- King of Galicia, King of Castile, King of León: claimed in January 1372 by his second marriage to the heiress to these thrones; unrecognised except for a brief period when he was able to capture Galicia from 1386 to 1387; claim surrendered in 1388
- Duke of Aquitaine (2 March 1390 – 3 February 1399): granted for life in March 1390 by his nephew, King Richard II of England

=== Arms ===
Coat of arms of John of Gaunt asserting his kingship over Castile and León, showing the royal arms of Castile and León impaling his paternal arms (the royal arms of England), with his heraldic difference. Later in his life the two sides were reversed.

As a son of the sovereign, John bore the royal arms of the kingdom (Quarterly, France Ancient and England), differenced by a label of three points ermine.

As claimant to the throne of Castile and León from 1372, he impaled the arms of that kingdom (Gules, a castle or, quartering Argent, a lion rampant purpure) with his own. The arms of Castile and León appeared on the dexter side of the shield (the left-hand side as viewed), and the differenced English royal arms on the sinister; but in 1388, when he surrendered his claim, he reversed this marshalling, placing his own arms on the dexter, and those of Castile and León on the sinister. He thus continued to signal his alliance with the Castilian royal house, while abandoning any claim to the throne. There is, however, evidence that he may occasionally have used this second marshalling at earlier dates.

In addition to his royal arms, Gaunt bore an alternative coat of Sable, three ostrich feathers ermine. This was the counterpart to his brother, the Black Prince's, "shield for peace" (on which the ostrich feathers were white), and may have been used in jousting. The ostrich feather arms appeared in stained glass above Gaunt's chantry chapel in St Paul's Cathedral.

== Legacy ==
John of Gaunt is a character in William Shakespeare's play Richard II. Shortly before he dies, he makes a speech that includes the lines (in Act 2, scene i, around line 40) "This royal throne of kings, this scepter'd isle, This earth of majesty, this seat of Mars ... This blessed plot, this earth, this realm, this England". He is also referred to by Falstaff in Henry IV Part I (in Act 2, scene ii).

Hungerford in Berkshire has ancient links to the Duchy, the manor becoming part of John of Gaunt's estate in 1362 before James I passed ownership to two local men in 1612 (which subsequently became Town & Manor of Hungerford Charity). The links are visible today in the Town & Manor-owned John O'Gaunt Inn on Bridge Street, and John O'Gaunt School on Priory Road.

== Sources ==
- Castor, Helen (2024). The Eagle and the Hart.
- Cohn, Samuel K. (2013). Popular Protest in Late Medieval English Towns. Cambridge: Cambridge University Press. ISBN 978-1-107-02780-0.

John of Gaunt House of Plantagenet Born: 6 March 1340 Died: 3 February 1399
Peerage of England
| New creation | Duke of Lancaster; 2nd creation 1362–1399 | Succeeded by Henry Bolingbroke |
| Preceded by Henry of Grosmont | Earl of Leicester; Earl of Lancaster; Earl of Derby; 1361–1399 | Succeeded by Henry Bolingbroke |
| Preceded by Robert III of Artois | Earl of Richmond; 29 September 1342 – 25 June 1372 | Succeeded by John IV of Brittany |
French nobility
| Preceded by Richard II | Duke of Aquitaine; 1390–1399 | Succeeded by Richard II |
Political offices
| Preceded by Henry of Grosmont | Lord High Steward; 1362–1399 | Succeeded by Henry Bolingbroke |
Titles in pretence
| Preceded by Henry II as unopposed king | — DISPUTED — King of Castile; 1372–1388 | Succeeded by John I as unopposed king |
