= Siege of the Tower of London (1460) =

1460 battle in the English Wars of the Roses

- Part of the Wars of the Roses
Date	2–19 July 1460
Location	London, England 51°30′29″N 0°04′34″W
Result	Yorkist victory

Belligerents
House of York	House of Lancaster

Commanders and leaders
Earl of Salisbury; Sir John Wenlock	Lord Scales (executed); Lord Hungerford

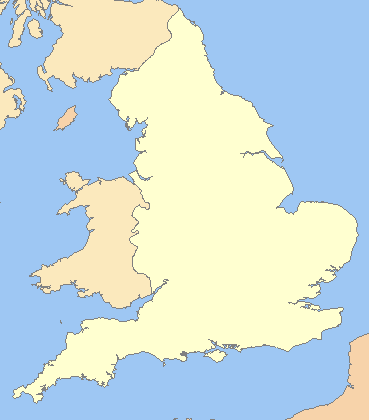
Locations:

– Siege of the Tower of London; – other battles; – other places

The siege of the Tower of London was an episode of the Wars of the Roses, in which adherents of the rival Plantagenet houses of Lancaster and York were pitted against each other. In June 1460, several Yorkist nobles, who had unsuccessfully rebelled against King Henry VI the year before and had fled to Calais, invaded the south east of England at Sandwich. They enjoyed widespread support through popular discontent with the ruling court among the populace of Kent and the merchants of London, and were greeted by enthusiastic crowds when they entered London on 2 July.

The Lancastrian garrison of the Tower of London, commanded by Lord Scales, opened fire indiscriminately into the surrounding streets with cannon and wildfire, causing many deaths and injuries. While most of the Yorkist army marched north into the Midlands to engage the King's Lancastrian army, 2000 men were left under the Earl of Salisbury to besiege the Tower. They were aided by many of the city's aldermen and armed militia, who used bombards secured from a royal depot to demolish part of the Tower's curtain wall, and blockaded the Tower to prevent supplies reaching the garrison.

On 10 July, the Yorkists won the Battle of Northampton and captured King Henry, who they treated respectfully for the time being. On 19 July, the garrison of the Tower were starved into surrender. Scales attempted to escape in disguise by boat, but was recognised and butchered by a mob.

== Background ==
King Henry VI of England, of the House of Lancaster, was a weak monarch, unable to control the squabbling nobles who made up his Council, and also prone to periods of insanity. In the late 1440s, there was a quarrel between two of the most powerful and influential nobles, Richard, Duke of York and Edmund Beaufort, Duke of Somerset. Both had claims to the throne should Henry die without a direct heir. York maintained that Somerset had mismanaged the Hundred Years War against France through treachery or self-interest, and that he himself was unfairly excluded from the King's council. He also supported those who complained against the lawlessness resulting from weak royal control and abuse of authority by the King's closest advisors. The King lapsed into madness in 1453 with the final loss of the English lands in France. York governed the country as Protector for about a year, but relinquished the office when Henry recovered and restored Somerset to royal favour.

In 1455 York and his chief supporters, the Nevilles (York's brother in law, the Earl of Salisbury and Salisbury's son, the Earl of Warwick, later known as the "Kingmaker"), rebelled. Somerset and several other supporters of the King were killed at the First Battle of St Albans. After the battle, York reaffirmed his loyalty to the King and was reappointed Protector. However, he had earned the implacable hostility of Henry's Queen, Margaret of Anjou, who suspected York of wishing to supplant Henry's new born son, Edward of Westminster, as heir to the throne. The successors of the nobles killed at Saint Albans remained at deadly feud with York and the Nevilles, who also provoked resistance from many who resented their wealth and presumption to offices of state.

In 1459, open warfare broke out again. York and the Nevilles concentrated their armies at Ludlow in the Welsh Marches, but were heavily outnumbered by a Lancastrian army nominally commanded by King Henry himself. At the Battle of Ludford Bridge, some of the demoralised Yorkist army defected. York, his two eldest sons and the Nevilles immediately deserted their forces and fled. The next day, the leaderless Yorkist army surrendered to the King. The Lancastrian army proceeded to plunder Ludlow, which was "robbed to the bare walls". Drunken Lancastrian troops also committed outrages against women and other citizens.

In November, a "Parliament of Devils" was summoned at Coventry in the Midlands. All those who attended (including about half the peerage) were required to take a special oath to the King, Queen and Edward of Westminster. The Parliament proceeded to enact severe penalties against York and his supporters, all of whom were attainted. The savage propaganda which accompanied these Acts caused widespread alarm among some of the nobles, and cities and towns which had previously been uncommitted and now feared Lancastrian retribution.

York and his second son Edmund of Rutland had meanwhile sailed to Ireland. The Nevilles and York's eldest son Edward of March originally intended to make their way there separately, but were forced by a contrary winds to Devonshire. A supporter, Sir John Dynham, informed them that the 2nd Duke of Somerset, who the King had appointed to take over the Pale of Calais from Warwick, had not yet set sail. He procured a ship which allowed the Nevilles and March to forestall Somerset by only a few hours. Somerset later landed near Calais and captured a castle at Guisnes nearby but was unable to capture Calais itself. Lancastrian efforts to reimpose their authority over Ireland were ineffectual.

== Warwick's moves ==
With difficulty, the Lancastrians were assembling an army and a fleet at Sandwich, under Earl Rivers, to reinforce Somerset. On 15 January 1460, Dynham and Sir John Wenlock surprised them and captured Rivers, his wife and son, 300 of his soldiers and several ships. The captives and prizes were carried back to Calais.

In March, Warwick sailed to Ireland to concert plans with the Duke of York. The Lancastrians had raised another fleet at Sandwich, this time under the Duke of Exeter, initially to reinforce Somerset or to rescue him from Calais. Exeter tried to intercept Warwick off Cornwall on his return voyage, but his crews were badly paid and victualled, and refused to engage Warwick's ships.

The Yorkists prepared to invade Kent. They preceded their invasion with a propaganda offensive, protesting against lawlessness, misuse of authority by some of the Lancastrian officers, and the injustice of the attainders of the previous year. As they had done for years, the Yorkists maintained that they were loyal to the King and were seeking to free him from his "evil counsellors". However, they also alleged that Edward of Westminster was a changeling or bastard. They inspired widespread support in Kent, where there had been previous popular uprisings (Jack Cade's Rebellion), and London, where the merchants were angry over the loss of trade. Exports of wool and broadcloth and imports of wine were a third of their value before 1459, partly as a result of royal attempts to prevent the Yorkists in Calais receiving support and revenue.

Early in June 1460, Yorkists from Calais led by Lord Fauconberg, Salisbury's younger brother, seized Sandwich again. This time they established a permanent foothold. On 26 June, Warwick, Salisbury and March landed at Sandwich and marched into Canterbury. There was no opposition. The Lancastrian fleet had mutinied again and, faced with the possibility of invasion from both Calais and Ireland, the King and his army remained in the Midlands, in a central position around Coventry. Even the Duke of Buckingham, who held the posts of Warden of the Cinque Ports (which included Sandwich), and Constable of Dover Castle, was absent from the area. (As the King's chief military advisor, he too was with the royal army near Coventry.)

== Yorkists occupy London ==
The Yorkists advanced via Dartford and Rochester towards London, continually gathering fresh recruits. They were accompanied from Canterbury by the Archbishop of Canterbury and by Francesco Coppini, a Papal Legate who took the Yorkist side and gave added weight to their popular appeals. They also gained support from some nobles whose lands were nearby, including Viscount Bourchier (another of the Duke of York's brothers in law) and the Duke of Norfolk. The aldermen and Common Council of the city initially refused them permission to enter the city, but were persuaded to reverse their decision by the merchants, many of whom were firm supporters of Warwick. (As Captain of Calais from 1455 to 1459, Warwick had led his ships in piratical attacks on Spanish and Hanseatic League ships, partly to gain plunder to pay his ill-paid garrison, but delighting the merchants by removing their rivals for trade.)

As the Yorkists approached London, the Lancastrian nobles in the city (who included Lords Hungerford, Lovell and de Vestri and the Earl of Kendal) and their families and the Duke of Exeter's wife all took refuge in the Tower of London. The Duke of Exeter was Constable of the Tower, but he held several other offices and was absent, and the Tower was actually held by Lord Scales. On 2 July, after the Yorkist lords had given assurances of their troops' behaviour, the city gates were thrown open to them. As they proceeded across London Bridge, crowds rushed forward and two men were trampled to death. The Yorkist soldiers were temporarily billeted in Smithfield.

== Siege of the Tower ==
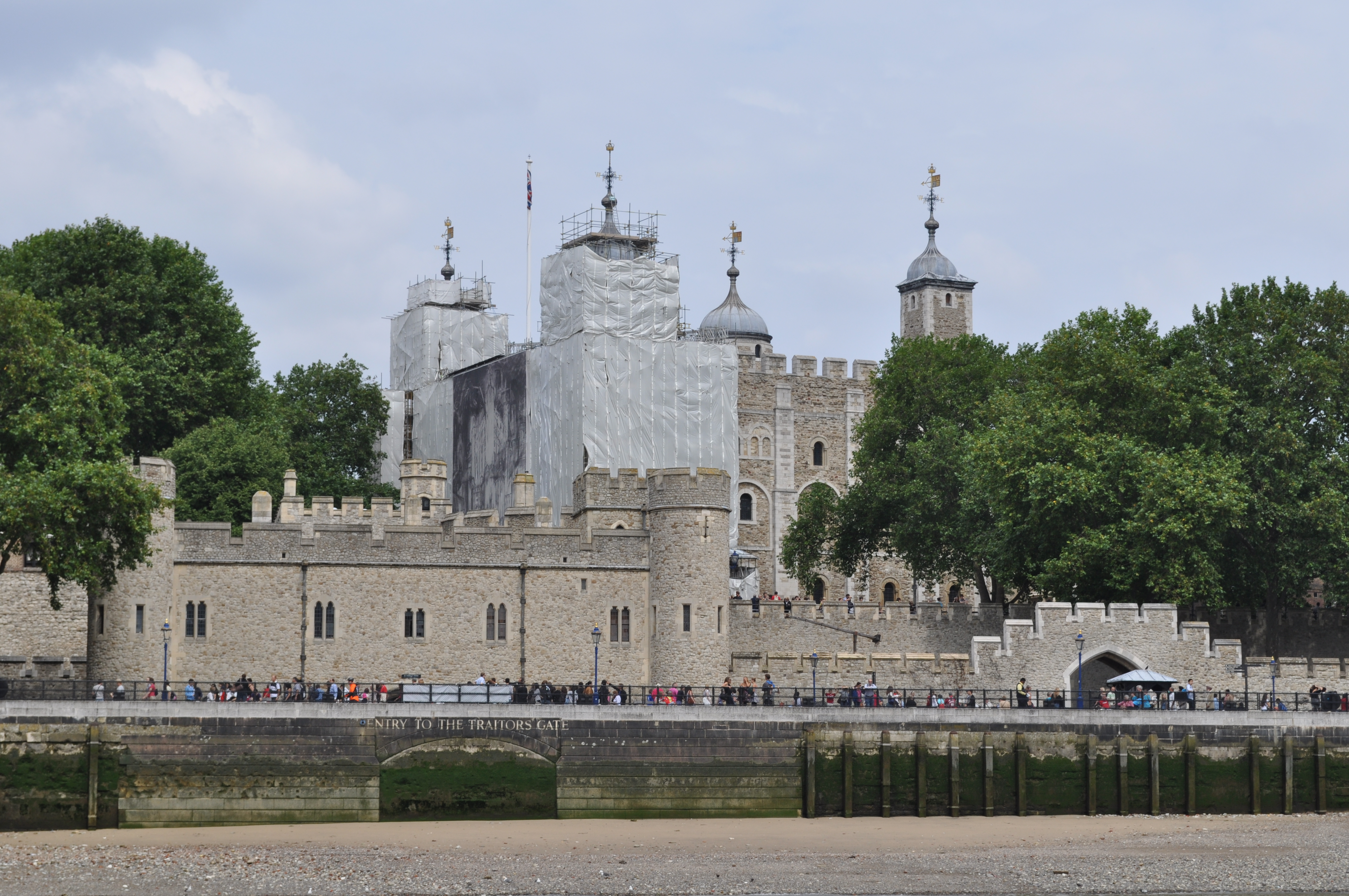
The White Tower and part of the curtain wall, from the south bank of the Thames

Lord Scales was a committed supporter of the House of Lancaster, and also a veteran commander of the Hundred Years' War, used to ruthless methods. As the Yorkists occupied London, Scales opened fire from the Tower indiscriminately into the surrounding streets. A contemporary chronicle related that "they that were within the Tower cast wildfire into the City, and shot in small guns, and burned and hurt men and women and children in the streets". Meanwhile, the day after they entered London, the Yorkist nobles addressed the Convocation of Canterbury at Saint Paul's Cathedral, promising once more to respect the King's person and estate. Two days later, Fauconberg set out for the Midlands with a contingent of 10,000 men of the army, followed soon afterwards by Warwick and Edward of March.

Salisbury, Lord Cobham and Wenlock were left with 2,000 men to besiege the Tower. They also had support from the militia raised from the infuriated citizens. Every reasonably affluent male person within the city owned at least a "jack" (a padded leather jerkin) and a sallet, while many possessed full "harness" (plate armour), and were armed with swords and daggers, and weapons such as bills and longbows. They were led by prominent citizens appointed as Sheriffs. (Two years previously, in 1458, no less than 7,000 militia had patrolled the city to prevent violence between nobles' retinues when they were gathered for a Grand Council.)

The city's Common Council acquired several bombards from a royal depot, and mounted them on the south bank of the River Thames opposite the Tower. Their fire brought down part of the Tower's curtain walls and terrified some of the noble families who had taken refuge inside. Lord Cobham, with some armed citizens blockaded the Tower from the City, while Sir John Wenlock with more militia under prominent mercer John Harowe invested the Tower from St Katherine's to the east. There were continuous clashes between the garrison and the besiegers. At one stage, Scales and the Lancastrian nobles in the Tower sent a letter to the city's council, demanding to know why the council was making war on them. The council replied that Scales had begun making war on the city, killing and maiming men, women and children by gunfire.

News was received that on 10 July, Warwick, March and Fauconberg had defeated the royal army at the Battle of Northampton. Several Lancastrian nobles including Buckingham were dead and King Henry himself was a prisoner in Yorkist hands. On 16 July, the Yorkist earls entered London with much ceremony. King Henry was lodged in the Bishop of London's palace. By this point, the garrison of the Tower was ready to surrender. They were short of food, there was no longer any hope of relief or reinforcement and morale was weakened by the pleas of the noble ladies within the Tower. Lord Hungerford eventually surrendered the Tower on 19 July, after gaining a promise that his own life and that of Scales would be spared. Scales did not believe that the promise of his life would be respected and on the following night he attempted to escape by water to sanctuary at Westminster Abbey. He was recognised by a woman, and his boat was surrounded by London's wherrymen, who dragged him out of his boat and murdered him. His naked body, covered in stab wounds, was thrown onto the steps of the Priory of Saint Mary Overie in Southwark.

== Aftermath ==
Despite his attack on London, Scales had a reputation as a hero in the Hundred Years War, and Warwick condemned his murder as regrettable. He and Edward of March attended Scales's funeral. Scales's daughter (already a widow) later married Anthony Woodville, the son of Earl Rivers. Hungerford was allowed to leave the country, to go on pilgrimage. The former Chancellor of the Exchequer Thomas Browne and his associates, who had attempted to smuggle provisions into the besieged Tower of London, were later executed.

The victorious Yorkists appropriated most of the offices of state, while continuing to rule in Henry's name. The Duke of York did not arrive in England until late September. When he arrived in London on 10 October, he attempted to claim the throne, to the dismay of the assembled nobles. Even the Nevilles were not prepared to support this drastic step. Eventually, York agreed to the Act of Accord, by which he was accepted as Henry's heir and allowed to continue to govern the country as Protector. However, Queen Margaret and her son were at large, and many Lancastrian nobles were gathering armies in the north of England. When the Duke of York marched north in December to deal with them, he fatally engaged them in the open. His army was overwhelmed and destroyed at the Battle of Wakefield, where York himself and Salisbury were killed.

After defeating Warwick at the Second Battle of St Albans and regaining custody of Henry VI, who had been abandoned on the battlefield, Queen Margaret threatened to occupy London with an army which contained many unruly Scots and borderers. She was dissuaded and withdrew to the North, partly because many of her army were deserting with their plunder and partly because London had barred its gates and Edward, Earl of March, was marching to London after his victory at Mortimer's Cross. Warwick and Edward of March reoccupied the city. Edward was proclaimed King on 4 March 1461 and on 29 March 1461 won a decisive victory at the Battle of Towton.

== Sources ==
- Castor, H. (2004). "Scales, Thomas, seventh Baron Scales (1399?–1460)". Oxford Dictionary of National Biography (online) (online ed.). Oxford University Press. doi:10.1093/ref:odnb/24776. (Subscription, Wikipedia Library access or UK public library membership required.)
- Clark, Karen L. (7 September 2016). The Nevills of Middleham: England's Most Powerful Family in the Wars of the Roses. Stroud: The History Press. ISBN 978-0-7509-6365-7.
- Rowse, A.L. (1966). Bosworth Field & the Wars of the Roses. Wordsworth Military Library. ISBN 1-85326-691-4.
- Sadler, John (2011). Towton: The Battle of Palm Sunday Field 1461. Pen & Sword Military. ISBN 978-1-84415-965-9.
- Seward, Desmond (2007). A Brief History of the Wars of the Roses. London: Constable and Robin. ISBN 978-1-84529-006-1.
- Weir, Alison (2015). Lancaster and York: the Wars of the Roses. London: Vintage. ISBN 978-0-099-54017-5.

== Other reading ==
- Churchill, Winston (1956). A History of the English-speaking Peoples. Vol. I. London: Cassell. ISBN 0-304-29500-0.
