= Edmund Beaufort =

Edmund Beaufort may refer to:

- Edmund Beaufort, 2nd Duke of Somerset (c. 1406–1455)
- Edmund Beaufort, 4th Duke of Somerset (c. 1438–1471)
