= John Beaufort, Marquess of Dorset =

English nobleman

John Beaufort, Marquess of Dorset, Earl of Dorset (1441 – 4 May 1471) was a scion of the Beaufort family, who fought for the Lancastrians in the Wars of the Roses.

== Origins ==
He was the third son of Edmund Beaufort, 2nd Duke of Somerset and his wife, Lady Eleanor Beauchamp, daughter of Richard de Beauchamp, Earl of Warwick.

== Wars of the Roses ==
His father was killed in 1455 at the First Battle of St Albans.When his eldest brother, Henry Beaufort, 3rd Duke of Somerset, was killed fighting for Lancaster in 1464 at the Battle of Hexham, the next brother, Edmund, succeeded to the Dukedom, and John became "Marquess of Dorset" and "Earl of Dorset", courtesy titles granted to the Beaufort heir-apparent or heir-presumptive. These titles were not recognized by King Edward IV, of the House of York. John had been in exile since 1461, first in Burgundy and then France. When Henry VI of Lancaster reclaimed the throne in October 1470, John returned with his brother Edmund. But a few months later, Henry was driven from the throne again, and the Lancastrians were on the run.

John was killed in the Battle of Tewkesbury on 4 May 1471, while fighting beside Edmund, who was captured and beheaded two days later. John left behind no issue and was never married. With the death of John and Edmund, the legitimate male line of the Beauforts ended.

== Ancestry ==
Ancestors of John Beaufort, Marquess of Dorset

16. Edward III of England
8. John of Gaunt, 1st Duke of Lancaster
17. Philippa of Hainault
4. John Beaufort, 1st Earl of Somerset
18. Sir Payne de Roet
9. Katherine Swynford
2. Edmund Beaufort, 2nd Duke of Somerset
20. Thomas Holland, 1st Earl of Kent
10. Thomas Holland, 2nd Earl of Kent
21. Joan, 4th Countess of Kent
5. Margaret Holland
22. Richard FitzAlan, 10th Earl of Arundel
11. Alice FitzAlan
23. Eleanor of Lancaster
1. John Beaufort, Marquess of Dorset
24. Thomas de Beauchamp, 11th Earl of Warwick
12. Thomas de Beauchamp, 12th Earl of Warwick
25. Katherine Mortimer
6. Richard Beauchamp, 13th Earl of Warwick
26. William Ferrers, 3rd Baron Ferrers of Groby
13. Margaret Ferrers
27. Margaret de Ufford
3. Eleanor Beauchamp
28. Maurice de Berkeley, 4th Baron Berkeley
14. Thomas de Berkeley, 5th Baron Berkeley
29. Elizabeth le Despenser
7. Elizabeth de Berkeley
30. Warine de Lisle, 2nd Baron Lisle
15. Margaret de Lisle, 3rd Baroness Lisle
31. Margaret Pipard
