= John Wenlock, 1st Baron Wenlock =

English politician (died 1471)

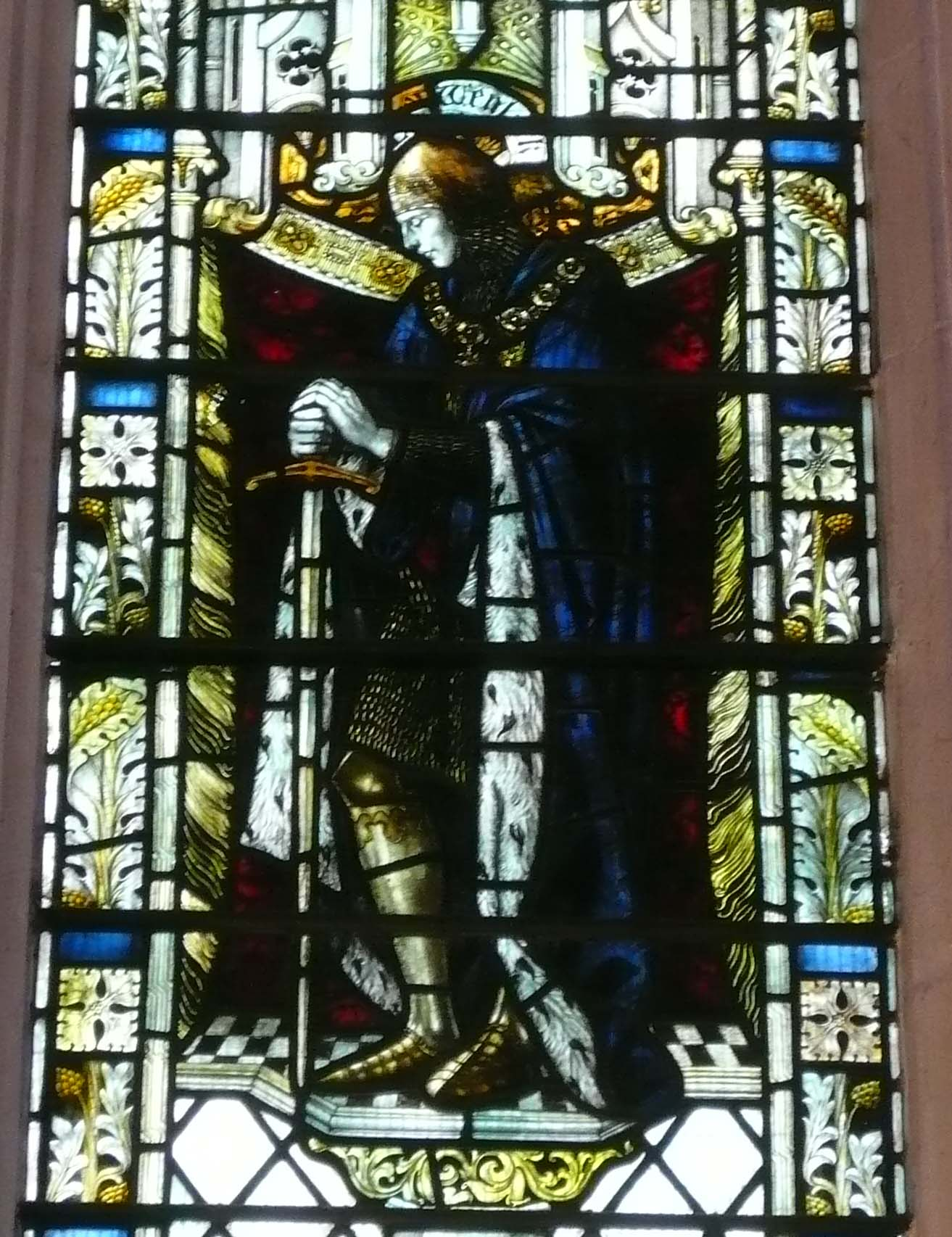
Sir John Wenlock, as portrayed in stained glass window in the Wenlock chapel at St. Mary's Church, Luton.

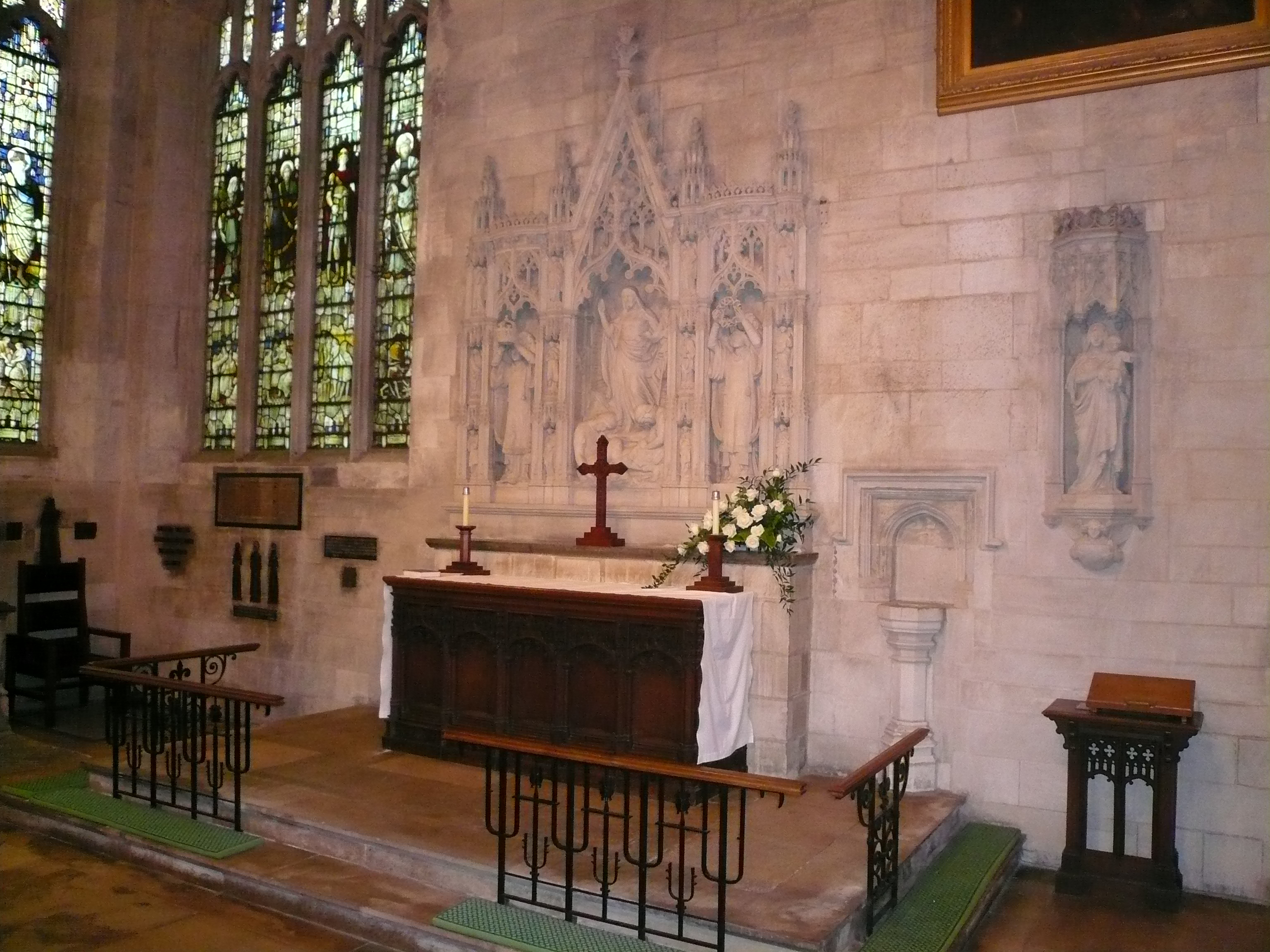
The Wenlock chapel.

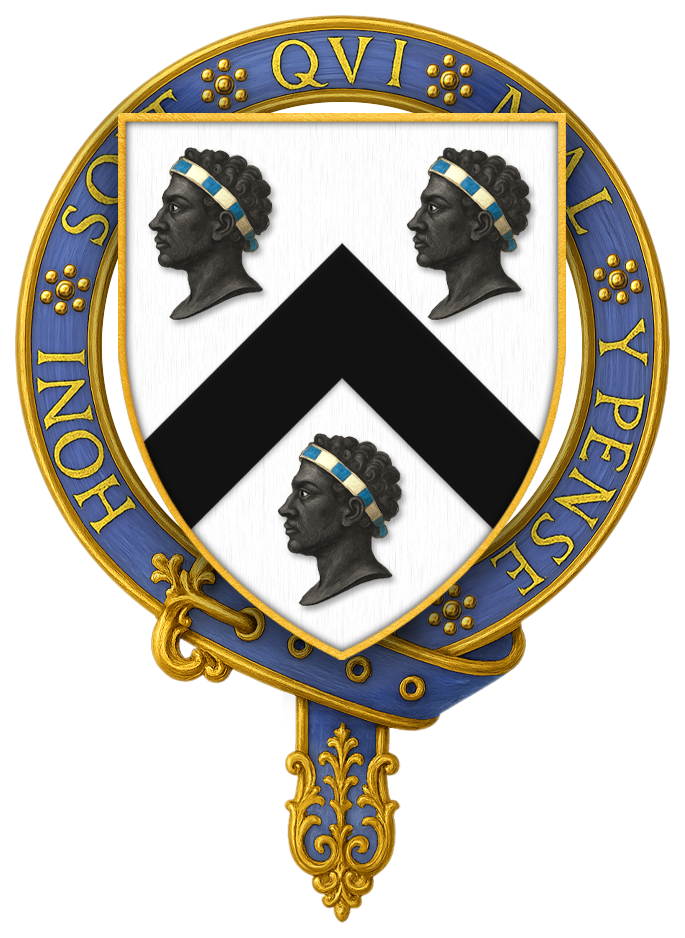
Arms of Sir John Wenlock, 1st Baron Wenlock KG.

John Wenlock, 1st Baron Wenlock KG (c.1400/04 – 4 May 1471) was an English politician, diplomat, soldier and courtier. He fought on the sides of both the Yorkists and the Lancastrians in the Wars of the Roses. He has been called "the prince of turncoats", although some historians suggest the label may not be fair as this behavior was commonplace during the Wars of the Roses. Others contend that even when Wenlock was not actually changing sides, he was engaged in "fence sitting par excellence."

Although Wenlock is often remembered for his military exploits (he fought in six of the major battles of the Wars of the Roses, as well as the sieges of the Tower of London and Dunstanburgh Castle), most of his public service was in the diplomatic field, and contemporary accounts record him as being regarded as "very clever".

== Early life ==
He was the son of William Wynell de Wenlock, commonly called William Wenlock, knight of the shire for Bedfordshire in 1404, by his wife Margaret Breton, an heiress of Houghton Conquest in Bedfordshire.

John Wenlock took part in the invasion of France under Henry V of England, and on 16 August 1421 he received a grant of lands in the bailiwick of Gisors in Normandy, and shortly after, in April 1422, is styled constable of Vernon. In 1433 he was returned to parliament for Bedfordshire, and again in 1437, 1449-40, 1447, February 1449, and 1455-56. He was elected Speaker of the House in the 1455 Parliament. He may also have served in the 1460 Parliament. He was escheator for Buckinghamshire and Bedfordshire in 1438–9, and he early entered the service of Margaret of Anjou, being first usher of the chamber, and about 1450 chamberlain to her. In this capacity he laid the first stone of Queens' College, Cambridge, on 15 April 1448.

He served also in 1444 as High Sheriff of Bedfordshire and Buckinghamshire. Wenlock's seat was at Luton, his property there, Someries Castle, coming through inheritance. In 1462 he acquired Hertfordshire property forfeited by the former Chief Justice, Sir John Fortescue.

His service to the Crown is also reflected in his employment as a member of some 18 embassies in the 1440s and 1450s. He was knighted in 1449. It appears to have been at one such embassy that he came into contact with the Duke of York and the Earl of Warwick (the "Kingmaker"), and he became a supporter of the latter.

== In the Wars of the Roses ==
During the Wars of the Roses, Wenlock initially fought for the House of Lancaster in the First Battle of St Albans on 22 May 1455, but his relationship with Warwick subsequently led him to change sides, and it was as a Yorkist that he served as Speaker of the House of Commons later that year in the parliament of 1455. By the Battle of Blore Heath in 1459 Wenlock fought for the House of York. He also fought under the Yorkist banner in the Battle of Mortimer's Cross, the Second Battle of St Albans and the Battle of Towton, all in what is referred to as the first phase of the Wars of the Roses.

Having successfully besieged the Tower of London for Edward of York, he was part of the latter's triumphal entry into London in 1461 and was elected a Knight of the Garter a few days after. Later in the year he received appointment as Chief Butler of England and was made Baron Wenlock. In 1464 he helped Lord Hastings capture Dunstanburgh Castle.

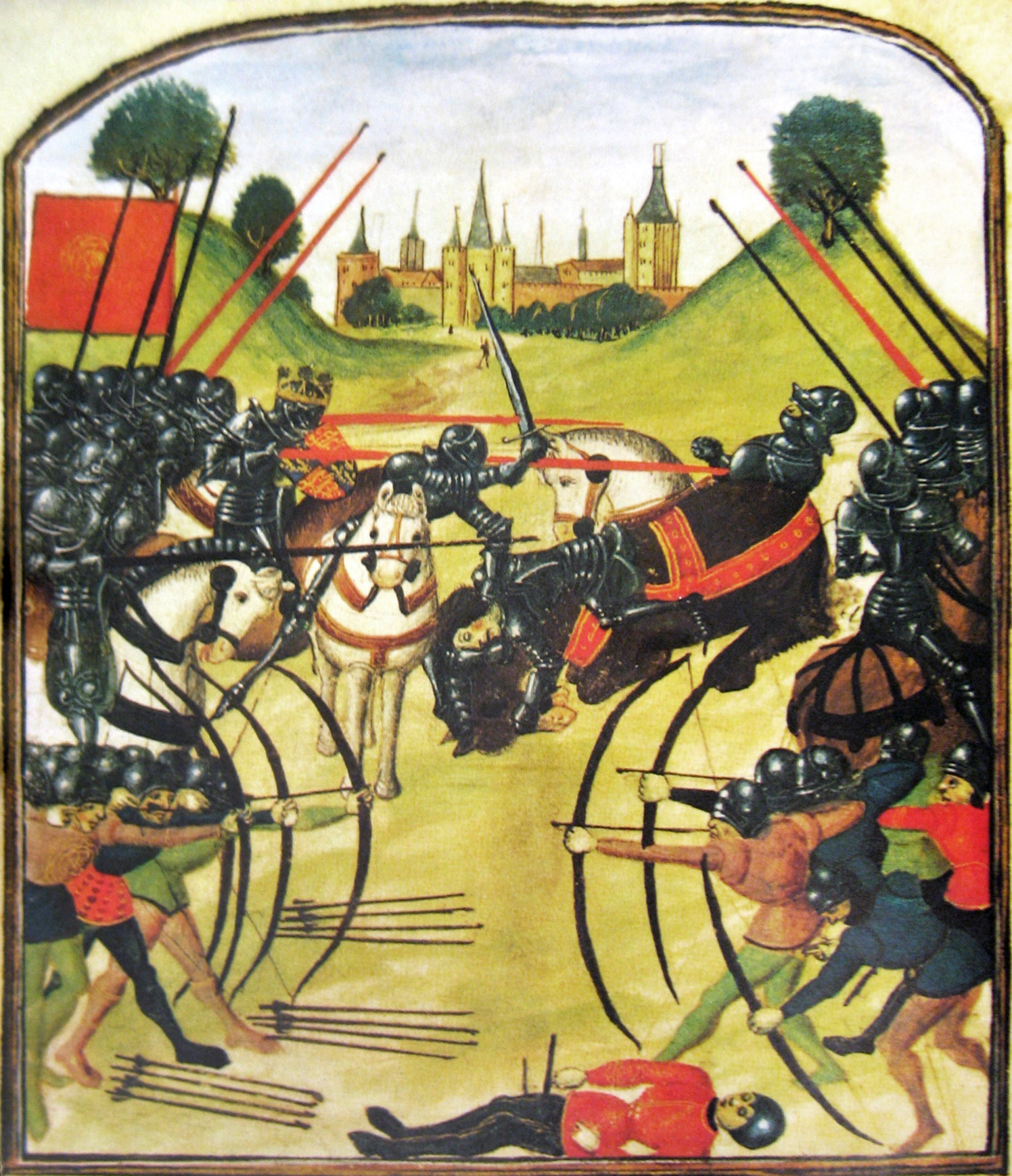
Image of the Battle of Tewkesbury, where Wenlock was killed, in a Ghent manuscript.

He continued to undertake diplomatic missions for Edward IV, and had command of Calais for him (possibly as deputy of Warwick). When Warwick defected to the Lancastrian camp, Wenlock did not immediately follow him back, but his sympathies clearly remained with his friend, and by 1471 he too had switched sides, accompanying Margaret of Anjou back to England.

== Death ==
At the Battle of Tewkesbury on 4 May 1471, he commanded the middle of the Lancastrian line. However, the Lancastrians suffered a crushing defeat, and Wenlock died on the battlefield. He was allegedly killed by his own commander, the Duke of Somerset, who blamed Wenlock's indecisiveness for the defeat. This story is likely a legend as it does not appear in any contemporary source. The Duke of Somerset had led the right flank of the Lancastrian line forward, and expected Wenlock to support him, but Wenlock held back (some suggest deliberately) and the Duke's men were slaughtered. Some sources suggest that Wenlock was committed to the cause, but that Somerset had bungled the planned manoeuvre, coming out of the woods too early, and emerging in front of the enemy instead of behind, thereby preventing Wenlock's men from shooting at them. Another possibility is that the Yorkist archers made Somerset's position untenable and the duke was forced to abandon his defensive position and engage the enemy.

== Family ==
Wenlock married twice in his life. His first wife, Elizabeth Drayton (who was the widow of Christopher Preston) died in the early 1460s after being married to him for over 30 years. In 1467 Wenlock then remarried Agnes Fray (herself a widow; her maiden name was Agnes Danvers and she had previously been married to Thomas Baldington; after Wenlock's death she married a 4th time to Sir John Say). At the time of this second marriage both spouses would have been in their 60s.

Wenlock died without issue, and his title died with him.

== See also ==
- Someries castle
- Wenlock Jug

== Notes ==
Attribution

This article incorporates text from a publication now in the public domain: "Wenlock, John". Dictionary of National Biography. London: Smith, Elder & Co. 1885–1900.

Political offices
Preceded by Thomas Singleton	High Sheriff of Bedfordshire and Buckinghamshire; 1444–1445	Succeeded by Thomas Rokes
Preceded by Sir Thomas Charlton	Speaker of the House of Commons; 1445–1446	Succeeded by Sir Thomas Tresham
Preceded by The Lord Tiptoft	Chief Butler of England; 1461–1471	Succeeded by The Earl of Wiltshire
Peerage of England
New creation	Baron Wenlock; 1461–1471	Extinct
