= Wenlok jug =

English 15th century jug

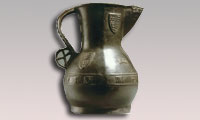

The Wenlok jug or Wenlock jug is a rare surviving example of an English bronze jug from the 15th century, with great significance for the study of bronze working in medieval England. Only two similar jugs are known in the UK. The Wenlok jug is the smallest of the three, but bears the earliest maker's mark for the English founder - possibly a bell founder - who cast it. The other examples are the Asante Ewer, which retains its lid and is held by the British Museum having been found at Kumasi in the Gold Coast in 1896 during the Anglo-Ashanti wars, and the Robinson jug, which was found in a farmhouse in Norfolk in the 1879 and is now in the collection of the Victoria & Albert Museum. All bear inscriptions in English and were made from leaded bronze, an alloy of copper, tin and lead, cast in a two-part mould in a similar manner using bronze spacers to separate the inner and outer moulds, with similar decorative motifs.

The Wenlok jug stands 31.5 centimetres (12.4 in) high and weighs 6.1 kilograms (13 lb). It is decorated with the words "My Lord Wenlok", and several heraldic emblems, including the Royal Arms of England used from 1340 to 1405, and the three crowns of East Anglia associated with St Edmund (who was King of East Anglia) and St Etheldreda. Hinges indicate a lid was once present, but it is now missing. It is thought to have been made for William Wenlock (d. 1391), Canon of St Paul's Cathedral from 1362, Archdeacon of Rochester from 1376, and Canon of the King's Chapel, Westminster in 1381, who is buried at St Mary's Church, Luton, or his great-nephew John Wenlock, 1st Baron Wenlock, whose brick-built manor house Someries Castle is near Luton.

By 1831 it was in the collection of Thomas William Fermor, 4th Earl of Pomfret, possibly acquired by antiquarian Henrietta Louisa Fermor.

The jug was sold by Alexander Fermor-Hesketh, 3rd Baron Hesketh at Sotheby's in 2005 along with other articles from Easton Neston in Northamptonshire. It reached £568,000, six times the top auctioneer's estimate of £60,000 to £80,000. The Metropolitan Museum of Art in New York tried to buy the jug from the buyer, but a temporary export ban in October 2005 allowed Luton Museum to raise £750,000 to match the price and acquire it instead, funded by £137,500 from the National Art Collections Fund, £500,000 from the National Heritage Memorial Fund, and donations from the Headley Trust, the Pilgrim Trust, the Worshipful Company of Founders, the Friends of Luton Museums, and others.

The jug was displayed in Luton at Wardown Park Museum and then at the Stockwood Discovery Centre in Stockwood Park. It was stolen from a high-security cabinet at Stockwood Discovery Centre on 12 May 2012. After appearing on the BBC's Crimewatch programme, the jug was recovered in Tadworth, Surrey in September 2012.

It has also been suggested that all three ewers were made in, or near, Bruges during the first week of July 1468, and given by the Charles the Bold, Count of Burgundy, to the travelling companions of his bride, Margaret of York (King Edward IV's sister). Her companions were Sir Anthony Woodville (Asante Ewer), the Duchess of Norfolk (the Robinson Jug), and Lord John Wenlock (the Wenlock Jug). The English texts were devised by the new countess, and the out-of-date coat of arms were in the household of the count's aunt, who had married the Duke of Bedford in 1423. The three jugs/ewers would therefore be examples of mid-fifteenth century Burgundian workmanship.
