= Asante Ewer =

14th century English artifact

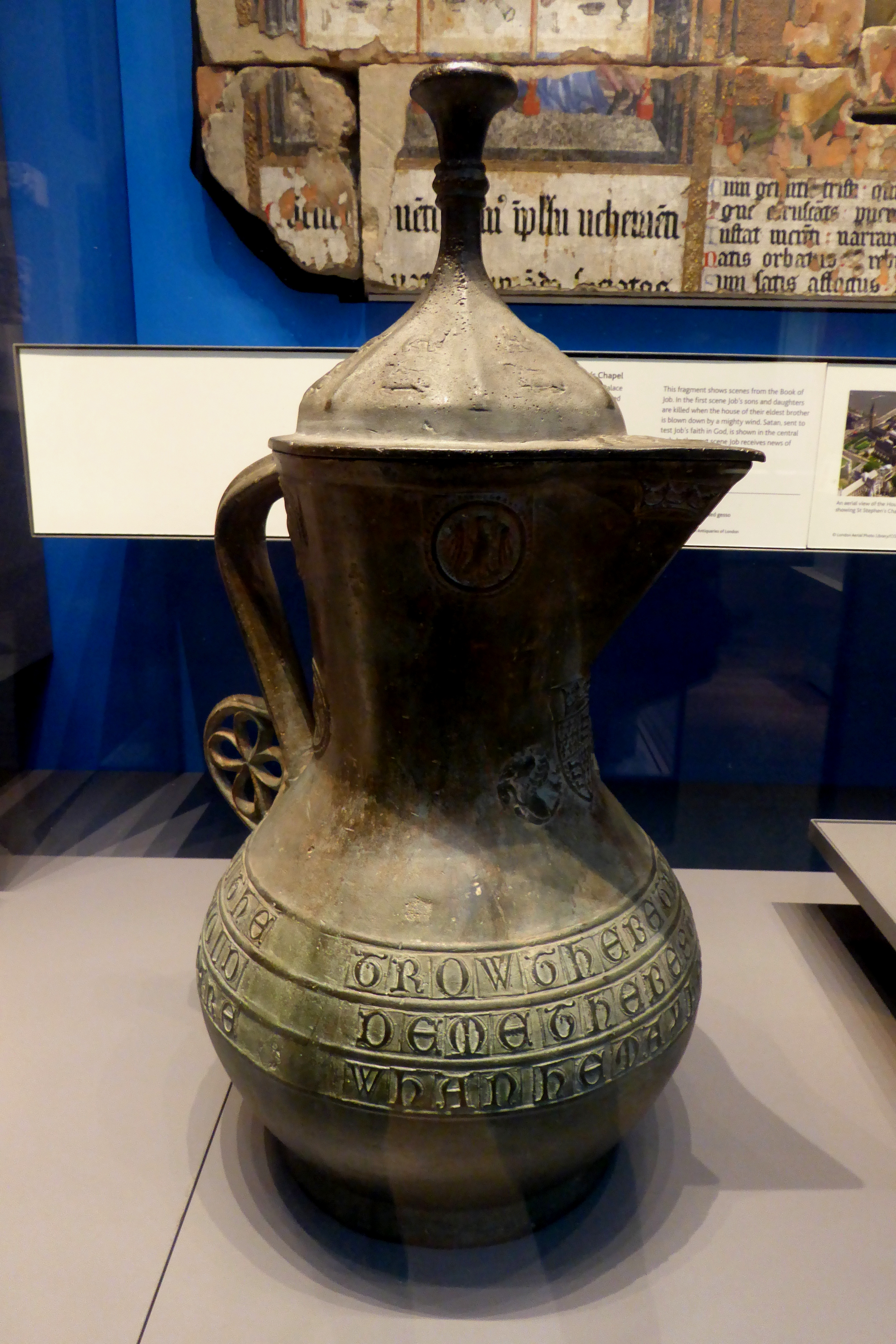
Asante Ewer, British Museum, 62.3 cm high (including lid)

The Asante Ewer or Asante Jug is a leaded bronze lidded jug dated to the 1390s. It is a rare surviving example of an English bronze jug from the 14th century, with great significance for the study of bronze working in medieval England. As one of the few surviving 14th century English jugs and in good condition, it was looted as a spoil of war from Kumasi in Asante (now Ghana) during the Fourth Anglo-Ashanti War in 1895, and since 1896 has been held by the British Museum in London. British forces set fire and blew up the Ashanti king's castle after removing the artifact.

== Description ==
The front of the Asante Jug is decorated with the Royal Arms of England from the late 14th century, surmounted by a crown, with two lion supporters. Above three lines of lettering in a Lombardic script, within a moulded band, read from the bottom:

"+ HE THAT WYL NOT SPARE WHEN HE MAY HE SHALL NOT / SPEND WHEN HE WOULD DEME THE BEST IN EVERY / DOWT TIL THE TROWTHE BE TRYID OWTE"

The inscription appears to be two English sentences, run together:

"He that will not spare when he may he shall not spend when he would" and "Deem the best in every doubt until the truth be tried out".

The neck of the Asante Jug bears six roundels, three on either side, each with a falcon spreading its wings, with one to each side of the spout and two either side of the handle. On the lip are three lions facing left, and a stag in a circle facing right. The seven-sided lid of the jug is original, decorated with a lion above a stag couchant in each segment. The handle ends with a scrolled quatrefoil.

Without the lid, the jug is 43.3 centimetres (17.0 in) high, and the lid (including the overlapping underlip) is 19.6 centimetres (7.7 in). When assembled with its lid, the jug is 62.3 centimetres (24.5 in) high. It weighs 18.6 kilograms (41 lb), and has a capacity of 15.8 litres (3.5 imp gal; 4.2 US gal). When filled, it would be inconveniently heavy to use.

== Similar jugs ==
Only two similar jugs are known in the UK. All have similar shapes, bear inscriptions in English with similar lettering, and were made from leaded bronze, an alloy of copper, tin and lead, cast in a two-part mould in a similar manner using bronze spacers to separate the inner and outer moulds, with similar heraldic decorative motifs. The Asante jug is the largest, and the only one to retain its lid.

Of the other two jugs, the smallest is Wenlok jug in Luton: it was sold by Alexander Fermor-Hesketh, 3rd Baron Hesketh in 2005. The third is the Robinson jug, which was found in a farmhouse in Norfolk in the 1879 and is now in the collection of the Victoria & Albert Museum. The other two have fittings for a hinged lid but the lid has not survived.

All three jugs were made in England. The heraldic emblems on this jug link it to either Edward III or Richard II. The stag badges on the lid suggest Richard II, who used the white stag in the 1390s. The jug was found in Manhyia Palace in Kumasi in 1895, but when and how it arrived in West Africa is not known. It is speculated that it was carried from Europe to Africa in the early modern period as an impressive gift to present to an African ruler, having been bought cheaply there. There is a photograph taken in 1887 which shows the jug under a sacred tree at the royal palace.

Another plainer 14th century English lidded jug is in Leeds City Museum.

== History ==
The jug was bought by the British Museum in 1896 from Major General Charles St Leger Barter, who served in the Fourth Anglo-Ashanti War in December 1895 to February 1896 (also known as the Second Ashanti Expedition) which reached Kumasi and deposed the Asantehene Prempeh I.
