= Eleanor Beauchamp, Duchess of Somerset =

English noblewoman

Lady Eleanor Beauchamp
- Baroness de Ros; Duchess of Somerset
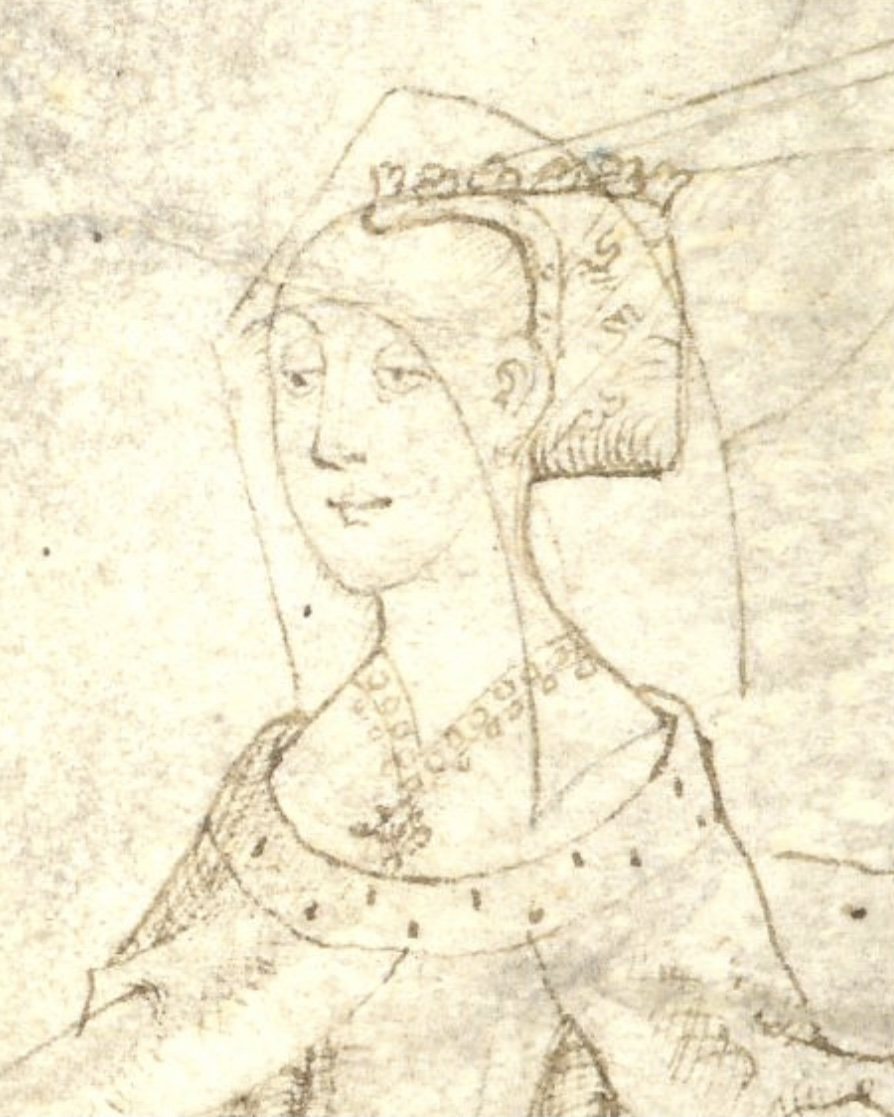
- Drawing of Eleanor from the Rous Roll, c. 1483
- Born: September 1408; Wedgenock, Warwickshire, England
- Died: 6 March 1467 (aged 58–59); Baynard's Castle, London, England
- Spouses: Thomas de Ros, 8th Baron de Ros; Edmund Beaufort, 2nd Duke of Somerset; Walter Rokesley
- Issue: 13, including: Thomas de Ros, 9th Baron de Ros; Richard Ros; Eleanor Beaufort, Countess of Ormonde; Henry Beaufort, 3rd Duke of Somerset; Margaret Beaufort, Countess of Stafford; Edmund Beaufort, 4th Duke of Somerset; John Beaufort, Marquess of Dorset
- Father: Richard de Beauchamp, 13th Earl of Warwick
- Mother: Elizabeth de Berkeley

Lady Eleanor Beauchamp, Baroness de Ros and Duchess of Somerset (September 1408 – 6 March 1467) was the second daughter of Richard de Beauchamp, 13th Earl of Warwick and Elizabeth de Berkeley, daughter of Thomas de Berkeley, 5th Baron Berkeley.

== First marriage ==
On 17 December 1423, Lady Eleanor was married to Thomas de Ros, 8th Baron de Ros. They were parents of the following surviving issue:

- Margaret de Ros (b. 1425 – d. 10 December 1488), married firstly (as his second wife) William de Botreaux, 3rd Baron Botreaux (d. 1462), secondly Thomas Burgh, 1st Baron Burgh of Gainsborough.
- Thomas de Ros, 9th Baron de Ros (b. 9 September 1427 – d. 17 May 1464)
- Richard Ros (b. 8 March 1429 – after 1492)

== Second marriage ==
Eleanor married Edmund Beaufort, 2nd Duke of Somerset sometime between 1431 and 1433. He was the son of John Beaufort, 1st Earl of Somerset and Lady Margaret Holland. They had the following surviving issue:

- Eleanor Beaufort, Countess of Ormonde (b. between 1431 and 1433 - d. August 16, 1501), married firstly James Butler, 5th Earl of Ormonde and secondly Sir Robert Spencer. Her daughter from her second marriage, Margaret, later became the mother-in-law of Anne Boleyn's sister, Mary.
- Joan Beaufort (b. 1433 – d. 11 August 1518), married firstly Robert St Lawrence, 3rd Baron Howth and secondly Sir Richard Fry.
- Anne Beaufort (b. 1435 – d. 17 September 1496), who married, Sir William Paston (b. 1436 – died before 7 September 1496), a younger son of William Paston (1378–1444), Justice of the Common Pleas.
- Henry Beaufort, 3rd Duke of Somerset (b. 26 January 1436 – d. 15 May 1464)
- Margaret Beaufort, Countess of Stafford (b. 1437 – d. 1474), married firstly Humphrey, Earl of Stafford and secondly Sir Richard Darell.
- Edmund Beaufort, 4th Duke of Somerset (b. 1439 – d. 4 May 1471)
- John Beaufort, Earl of Dorset (b. 1441 – 4 May 1471)
- Thomas Beaufort (b. 1442 – d. 1517)
- Elizabeth Beaufort (b. 1443 - died before 1475), married Sir Henry FitzLewis.
- Mary Beaufort (b. between 1431 and 1455)

== Third marriage ==
She married thirdly to Walter Rokesley. There was no known issue from this marriage.

== Death ==
She died on 6 March 1467 at the age of 58 at Baynard's Castle, London, England.

== Ancestry ==
Ancestors of Lady Eleanor Beauchamp

16. Guy de Beauchamp, 10th Earl of Warwick
8. Thomas de Beauchamp, 11th Earl of Warwick
17. Alice de Toeni
4. Thomas de Beauchamp, 12th Earl of Warwick
18. Roger Mortimer, 1st Earl of March
9. Katherine Mortimer
19. Joan de Geneville, 2nd Baroness Geneville
2. Richard de Beauchamp, 13th Earl of Warwick
20. Henry Ferrers, 2nd Baron Ferrers of Groby
10. William Ferrers, 3rd Baron Ferrers of Groby
21. Isabel Verdon
5. Margaret Ferrers
22. Robert d'Ufford, 1st Earl of Suffolk
11. Margaret de Ufford
23. Margaret de Norwich
1. Lady Eleanor Beauchamp
24. Thomas de Berkeley, 3rd Baron Berkeley
12. Maurice de Berkeley, 4th Baron Berkeley
25. Margaret Mortimer
6. Thomas de Berkeley, 5th Baron Berkeley
26. Hugh le Despenser the Younger
13. Elizabeth le Despenser
27. Eleanor de Clare
3. Elizabeth de Berkeley
28. Gerard de Lisle, 1st Baron Lisle
14. Warin de Lisle, 2nd Lord Lisle
29. Eleanor FitzAlan
7. Margaret de Lisle, 3rd Baroness Lisle
30. Sir William Pipard
15. Margaret Pipard
31. Margery
