= Edmund Beaufort, 2nd Duke of Somerset =

English noble (1406–1455)

His Grace The Duke of Somerset KG
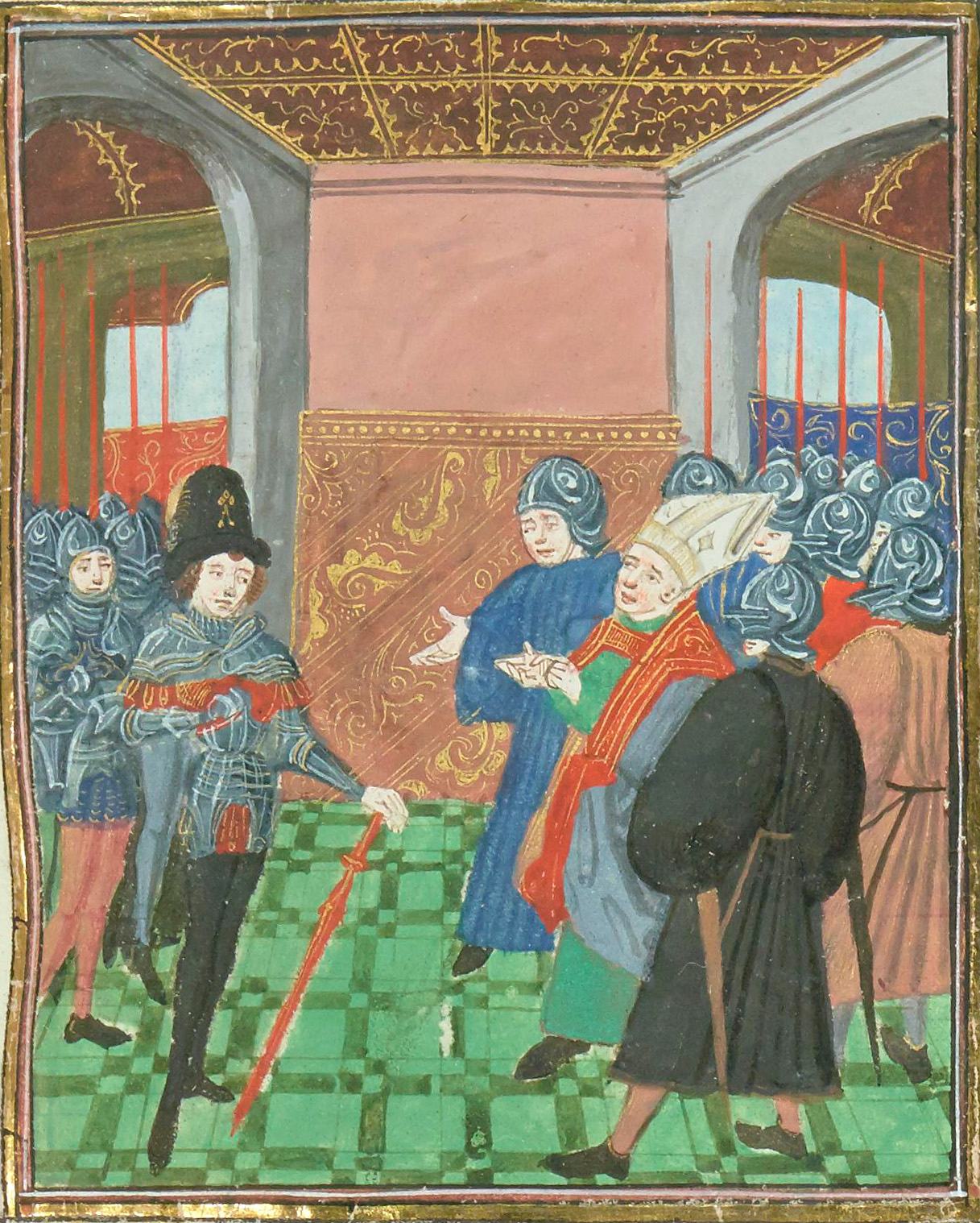
- Edmund Beaufort (left) negotiating with French envoys at Rouen, miniature from Bibliotheque Nationale de France, MS Fr. 2691, a copy of the Chronique of Jean Chartier, c. 1470–80, probably decorated by Philippe de Mazerolles
- Born: 1406
- Died: 22 May 1455 (aged ~49); St Albans, Hertfordshire, England
- Resting place: St Albans Abbey
- Opponent: Richard, Duke of York
- Spouse: Eleanor Beauchamp
- Children: 10, including: Henry Beaufort, 3rd Duke of Somerset; Margaret Beaufort, Countess of Stafford; Edmund Beaufort, 4th Duke of Somerset; John Beaufort, Marquess of Dorset
- Parent(s): John Beaufort, 1st Earl of Somerset; Margaret Holland
- Family: Beaufort
- Military career
- Conflicts: Hundred Years' War; Wars of the Roses
- Awards: Order of the Garter

Arms of Beaufort: Royal arms of King Edward III within a bordure compony argent and azure for difference of Beaufort

Edmund Beaufort, 2nd Duke of Somerset, 4th Earl of Somerset, 1st Earl of Dorset, 1st Marquess of Dorset styled 1st Count of Mortain (Note: He was actually the first Duke of Somerset of the second creation of that title since his elder brother's title was extinct.) (1406 – 22 May 1455), was an English nobleman and an important figure during the Hundred Years' War. His rivalry with Richard, Duke of York, was a leading cause of the Wars of the Roses.

== Origins ==
Edmund Beaufort was the fourth surviving son of John Beaufort, 1st Earl of Somerset, and his wife, Margaret Holland. Edmund's father John Beaufort was the eldest son of John of Gaunt, the third surviving son of King Edward III, and his mistress, later wife, Katherine Swynford. Although John Beaufort had been born out of wedlock, he was legitimised in 1396. Edmund's mother, Margaret Holland, was a daughter of Thomas Holland, 2nd Earl of Kent, and his wife, Alice FitzAlan. Alice was the daughter of Richard FitzAlan, 10th Earl of Arundel, and his wife, Eleanor of Lancaster. Eleanor in turn was the daughter of Henry, 3rd Earl of Lancaster, a grandson of King Henry III. Edmund was thus a cousin of both Richard, Duke of York, and the Lancastrian King Henry VI.

== Early life ==
Around the time of Edmund's birth in 1406, the House of Beaufort was among the most significant noble families in England. The Beauforts were half-brothers of King Henry IV, who was the son of John of Gaunt and his first wife, Blanche of Lancaster, and held significant royal favor. Edmund's father John was considered "one of Henry IV's most trusted councillors." Edmund's uncles Henry and Thomas Beaufort were also significant political figures: Henry was the Bishop of Lincoln and Winchester and would serve on three occasions as Lord Chancellor; Thomas held various military posts and would later become Chancellor.

Edmund's father John died in 1410, soon after his birth. Margaret Holland, Edmund's mother, remarried Thomas of Lancaster, Duke of Clarence, the younger brother of King Henry V, and Edmund may have been raised by the pair. In 1419, Edmund and his surviving brothers John and Thomas Beaufort travelled to Normandy, where the Duke of Clarence had command over the English army. Because of his youth, Edmund likely remained with his mother's household in Rouen instead of joining Clarence's campaign, which culminated with the death of the Duke of Clarence and the capture of both Edmund's brothers in 1421 at the Battle of Baugé.

== Career ==
Although Edmund's older brothers were imprisoned, they had inherited the vast majority of their father's estates. Edmund himself did not hold any land in England until his marriage to Eleanor Beauchamp provided him with an annual income of £205 that was modest by the standards of major nobles. By contrast, Edmund's eventual rival Richard, Duke of York, received annual incomes exceeding £5,000. Edmund's attempts to secure lands and offices with an income that would support his claim to be a leading magnate of the realm would prove a driving force of his career.

=== Affair with Catherine of Valois ===
In 1425, rumors began to circulate of an affair between Edmund Beaufort and Catherine of Valois, King Henry V's widow and the mother of King Henry VI. The liaison may have been the impetus for a parliamentary statute issued in 1427–28 seeking to regulate the remarriage of queens of England. Although Catherine of Valois later remarried Owen Tudor in secret, it is not clear when any relationship between the queen and Edmund ended (if it had existed at all), and Catherine's choice to name her first son through this new marriage Edmund Tudor has led to serious speculation as to whether Edmund Beaufort was the real father.

The historian G. L. Harriss wrote: "By its very nature the evidence for Edmund Tudor's parentage is less than conclusive, but such facts as can be assembled permit the agreeable possibility that Edmund 'Tudor' and Margaret Beaufort were first cousins and that the royal house of 'Tudor' sprang in fact from Beauforts on both sides."

=== Early military career and marriage ===
Edmund returned to Normandy in February 1427 with a significant retinue (likely paid for by his wealthy uncle Henry Beaufort, now a cardinal and one of the leading churchmen in England) to fight in the Hundred Year's War. Soon after reaching Rouen, Edmund was made Count of Mortain on 22 April, 1427 by John of Lancaster, Duke of Bedford, the Regent of England and overall commander of English forces in France. Although Mortain's position on the French border made it the target of frequent raids and made collecting the county's revenues a mostly "theoretical" prospect, it still represented an important title that placed Edmund on a par with England's earls.

Edmund spent much of the next few years campaigning in Normandy, first seeing battle in the unsuccessful Siege of Montargis. By August 1429, the English Crown's dependence on loans from Henry Beaufort to fund the war effort allowed the cardinal to exercise significant patronage on behalf of his nephew, and Edmund was given command of the section of the English army operating in the Norman Vexin. He achieved significant successes over the next years, capturing several border towns and fortresses in the region, most notably the great castle of Château-Gaillard in April 1430 and the fortified town of Louviers in October 1431.

After the fall of Louviers, Beaufort was one of many lords accompanying King Henry VI for his coronation as King of France in Paris on 16 December 1431. Edmund then returned to England with the King in February 1432, ending his first period of military service.

After returning to England, Edmund married Eleanor Beauchamp without obtaining royal license. At least one historian has speculated that Edmund and Eleanor may have forced their marriage's recognition by getting Eleanor pregnant. In addition to the modest lands she held as the widow of Baron Roos, Eleanor was expected to receive a significant inheritance from her wealthy parents Richard de Beauchamp, Earl of Warwick and Elizabeth Berkeley. However, whether out of pique at finding himself with an unwanted son-in-law or for other family reasons, Richard de Beauchamp entailed his entire estate, including the lands of his first wife, to the children of his second marriage with Isabel Despenser. Edmund and Eleanor's disinheritance created an ongoing legal dispute that set Edmund at odds with Richard Neville, the primary beneficiary of Richard de Beauchamp's new inheritance scheme, but also forged a close relationship between Edmund and his new brother-in-law John Talbot, Earl of Shrewsbury, who was married to Margaret Beauchamp, another disinherited daughter of Richard de Beauchamp's first marriage.

=== Calais and Harfleur ===
In March 1436, Cardinal Beaufort lent the Crown the funds to equip a 2,000-man expedition to Normandy led by Edmund. Edmund came under the overall command of the Duke of Gloucester, who was planning a campaign to punish Duke Phillip of Burgundy for his decision to align with France in the Hundred Year's War. Under Gloucester's command, Edmund led a series of chévauchées into Burgundian Picardy.

Edmund's performance sufficiently impressed Gloucester that the Duke left the army in Beaufort's hands while he returned to England to gather reinforcements. During Gloucester's absence, Duke Philip of Burgundy raised a large army and laid siege to Calais. Edmund conducted an aggressive defense of the stronghold, preventing a Burgundian attempt to seal the harbor with blockships and leading sallies while Gloucester assembled a relief army of 8,000 men that finally forced Philip to abandon the siege. For his role in the victory, Edmund was made a Knight of the Garter and constable of several royal castles in 1436, and in 1438, he was appointed governor of the County of Maine.

1438 also saw the final conclusion of the 17-year negotiations for the ransom of Edmund's older brother John Beaufort, and, despite his more extensive military experience, seniority meant that Edmund was placed under his brother's command in 1439 and 1440. In October 1440, Edmund recaptured Harfleur, an important port and stronghold on the mouth of the Seine after defeating a French relief force.

=== Political power and conflict ===
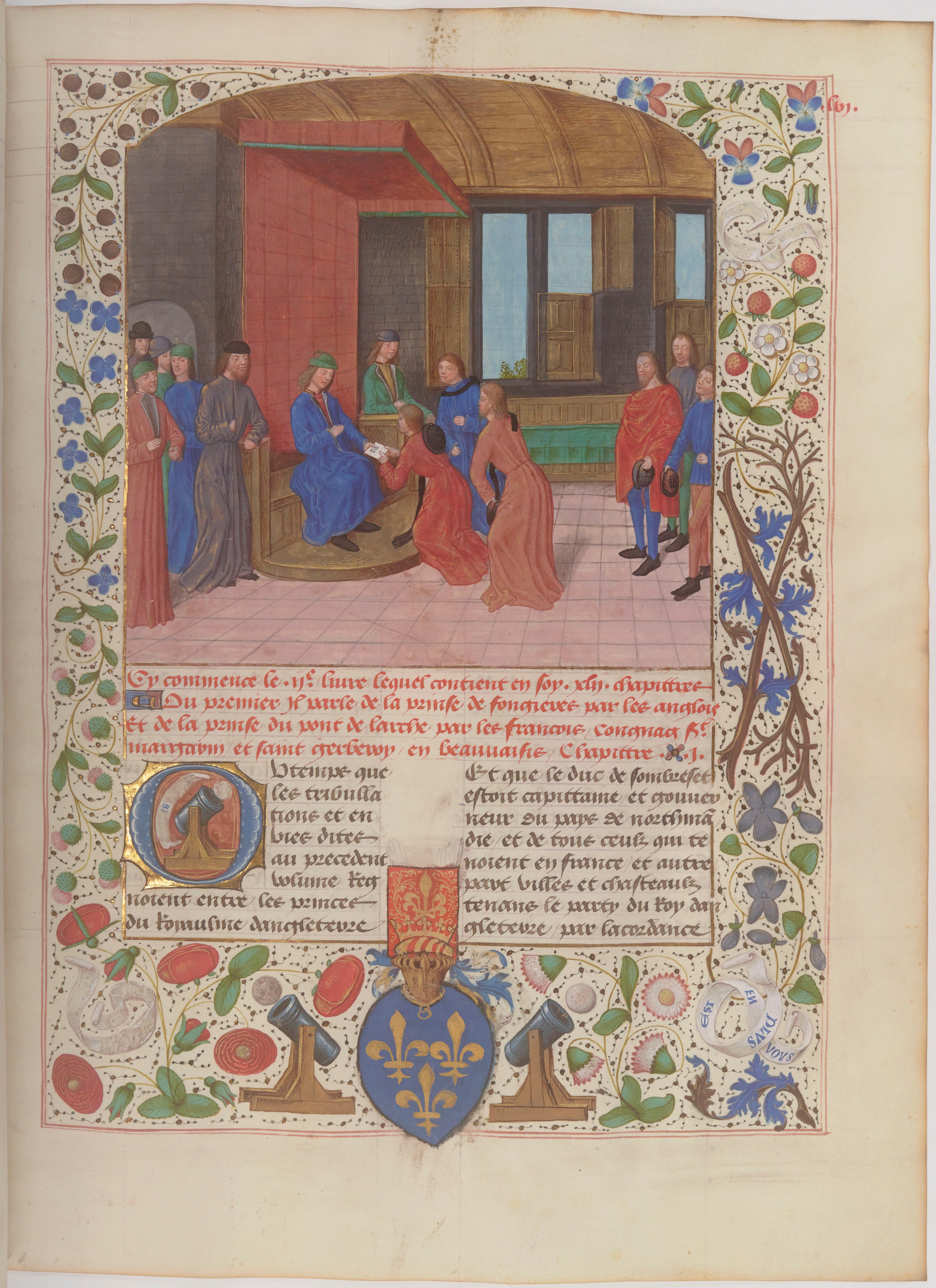
Edmund surrenders to Charles VII at Rouen in 1449. Illuminated page from the Anciennes chroniques d'Angleterre, Jean de Wavrin.

Edmund was created Earl of Dorset on 28 August 1442 (though he seems to have been styled as such since around 1438) and Marquess of Dorset on 24 June 1443. During the five-year truce from 1444 to 1449 he served as Lieutenant of France. On 31 March 1448 he was created Duke of Somerset. As the title had previously been held by his brother, he is sometimes mistakenly called the second duke, but the title was actually created for the second time, and so he was actually the first duke, the numbering starting over again.

Somerset was appointed to replace York as commander in France in 1448. Somerset was supposed to be paid £20,000; but little evidence exists that he was. Fighting began in Normandy in August 1449. Somerset's subsequent military failures left him vulnerable to criticism from York's allies. The most humiliating moment was when Somerset surrendered Rouen, the capital of Normandy, to the French without even a token siege. He failed to repulse French attacks, and by the summer of 1450 nearly all the English possessions in northern France were lost, with Normandy having fallen after the Battle of Formigny and Siege of Caen. By 1453 all the English possessions in the south of France were also lost and the Battle of Castillon ended the Hundred Years War.

The fall of the duke of Suffolk left Somerset the chief among King Henry VI's ministers, and the Commons in vain petitioned for his removal in January 1451. Power rested with Somerset and he virtually monopolised it, with Margaret of Anjou, wife of King Henry, as one of his principal allies. It was also widely suspected that Somerset had an extra-marital affair with Margaret. After giving birth to a son in October 1453, Margaret took great pains to quash rumours that Somerset might be his father. During her pregnancy Henry suffered a mental breakdown, prompted by the English defeat at Castillon, which left him in a withdrawn and unresponsive state that lasted for one-and-a-half years. This medical condition, untreatable either by court physicians or by exorcism, plagued him throughout his life. During Henry's illness, the child was baptised Edward, Prince of Wales, with Somerset as godfather; if the King could be persuaded, he would become legal heir to the throne.

Somerset's fortunes, however, soon changed when his rival York assumed power as Lord Protector in April 1454 and imprisoned him in the Tower of London. Somerset's life was probably saved only by the King's seeming recovery late in 1454, which forced York to surrender his office. Henry agreed to recognise Edward as his heir, putting to rest concerns about a successor prompted by his known aversion to physical contact; subsequently he came to view Edward's birth as a miracle. Somerset was honourably discharged, and restored to his office as Captain of Calais.

By now York was determined to depose Somerset by one means or another, and in May 1455 he raised an army. He confronted Somerset and the King in an engagement known as the First Battle of St Albans, which marked the beginning of the Wars of the Roses. Somerset was killed in a last wild charge from the house where he had been sheltering. His son, Henry, never forgave York and Warwick for his father's death, and spent the next nine years attempting to restore his family's honour.

== Marriage and children ==
At some time between 1431 and 1433, Somerset married Eleanor Beauchamp, daughter of Richard de Beauchamp, 13th Earl of Warwick, by his first wife Elizabeth de Berkeley, daughter and heiress of Thomas de Berkeley, 5th Baron Berkeley. Eleanor was an elder half-sister of Henry de Beauchamp, 1st Duke of Warwick, and Anne de Beauchamp, 16th Countess of Warwick, wife of Richard Neville, 16th Earl of Warwick, known as the "Kingmaker". The marriage was without royal licence, which offence was pardoned on 7 March 1438. By his wife he had issue including:

=== Sons ===
- Henry Beaufort, 3rd Duke of Somerset (26 January 1436 – 15 May 1464), eldest son and heir, who was beheaded after the Battle of Hexham, where he commanded the Lancastrian troops. He died unmarried, but left an illegitimate son by his mistress Joan Hill:
  - Charles Somerset, 1st Earl of Worcester, 1st Baron Herbert (c.1460-1526), KG, who was given the surname "Somerset" and was created Baron Herbert in 1506 and Earl of Worcester in 1513. From him descend the Earls and Marquesses of Worcester and the present Dukes of Beaufort.
- Edmund Beaufort, 4th Duke of Somerset (1439 – 6 May 1471), who succeeded his elder brother. He was executed two days after being defeated in the Battle of Tewkesbury, in which he commanded the van of the Lancastrian army, and was buried in Tewkesbury Abbey. Died unmarried, the last of the male line, when "the house of Beaufort and all the honours to which they were entitled became extinct".
- John Beaufort, Earl of Dorset (1441 – 4 May 1471), killed fighting for the Lancastrians during the Battle of Tewkesbury, two days before his elder brother's execution. Died unmarried.
- Thomas Beaufort (died young before 1463), another son identified by Alison Weir, but not by the traditional sources.

=== Daughters ===
Arms of Cary, Viscount Falkland (extant family and title), quartering Spencer and Beaufort

Following the death of all their brothers without issue, fighting for the Lancastrian cause, they became co-heiresses to their father, and their descendants were thus entitled to quarter the arms of Beaufort.

- Eleanor Beaufort (Countess of Ormond) (between 1431 and 1433 – 16 August 1501), who married firstly James Butler, 5th Earl of Ormond, and secondly Sir Robert Spencer (d. pre-1510), of London and Bridport, Dorset, also of Ashbury in Devon; frequently stated erroneously in credible sources to be of Spencer Combe, Crediton, Devon. One of the two daughters and co-heiresses of Sir Robert Spencer by his wife Eleanor Beaufort was Margaret Spencer (1472–1536) (or Eleanor), who married Thomas Cary of Chilton Foliat in Wiltshire, the younger son of William Cary (1437–1471) of Cockington and Clovelly in Devon, whose descendants included Cary, Viscount Falkland; Cary, Baron Hunsdon; Cary, Baron Cary of Leppington, Earl of Monmouth; and Cary, Viscount Rochfort, Earl of Dover, all of whom quartered the arms of Beaufort.
- Joan Beaufort (1433 – 11 August 1518), married firstly Robert St Lawrence, 3rd Baron Howth, and secondly Sir Richard Fry.
- Anne Beaufort (1435 – 17 September 1496), who married Sir William Paston (1436 – before 7 September 1496), a younger son of William Paston (1378–1444), Justice of the Common Pleas.
- Margaret Beaufort, Countess of Stafford (1437–1474), married firstly Humphrey, Earl of Stafford and secondly Sir Richard Darell, of Littlecote (in Ramsbury), Wiltshire.
- Elizabeth Beaufort (1443 – before 1475), married Sir Henry Fitz Lewis.
- Mary Beaufort (born between 1431 and 1455)

== Notes ==
Legal offices
Preceded by The Duke of York	Justice in eyre south of the Trent; 1453–1455	Possibly vacant
Peerage of England
New creation	Duke of Somerset; 2nd creation (1448); 1448–1455	Succeeded by Henry Beaufort
New creation	Marquess of Dorset; 1443–1455	Succeeded by Henry Beaufort
New creation	Earl of Dorset; 1442–1455	Succeeded by Henry Beaufort
Preceded by John Beaufort	Earl of Somerset; 1444–1455	Succeeded by Henry Beaufort
