= Battle of Tewkesbury =

1471 Yorkist victory in the Wars of the Roses

- Part of the Wars of the Roses
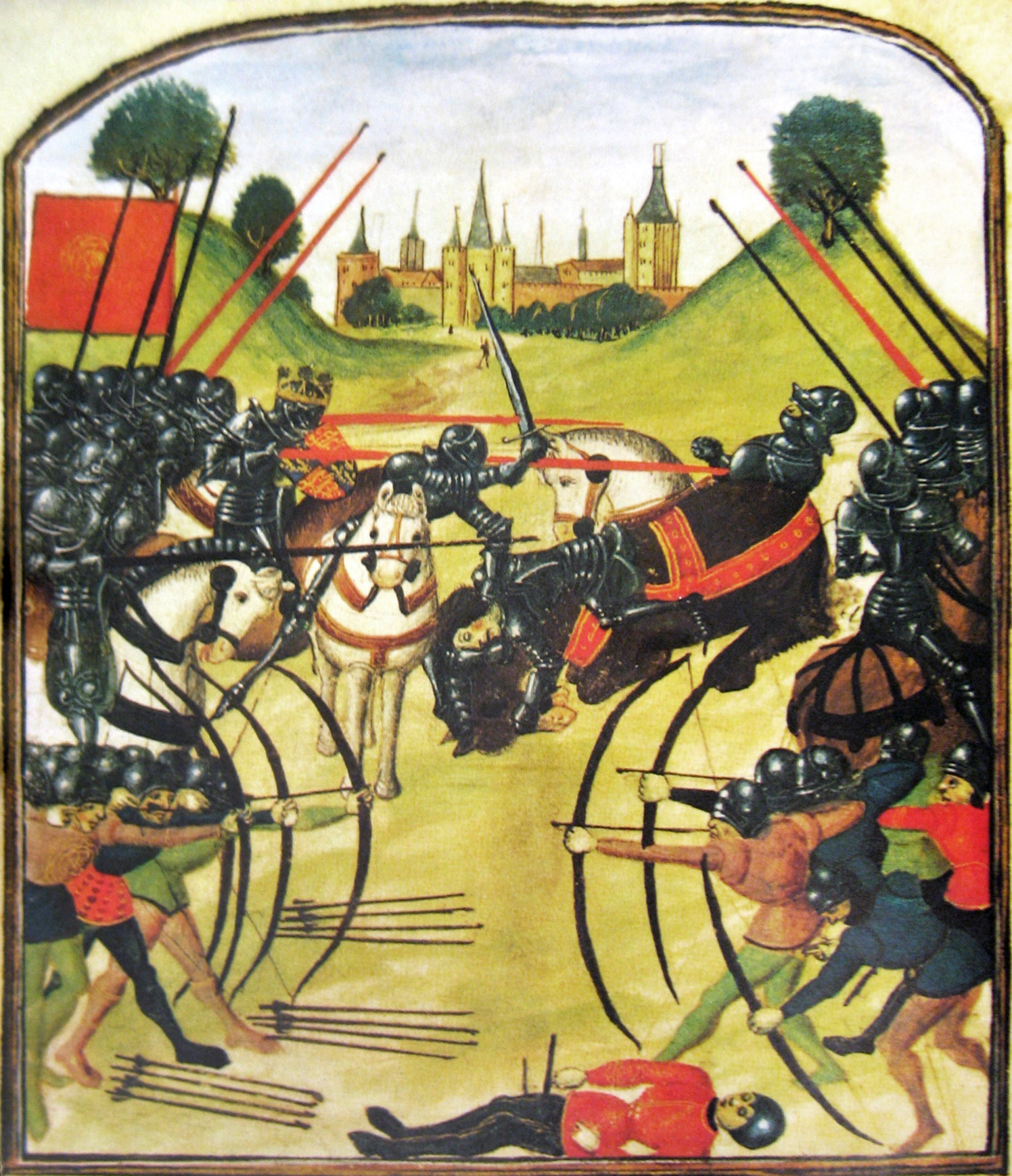
- The battle depicted in a Ghent manuscript
Date	4 May 1471
Location	Tewkesbury, Gloucestershire, England 51°59′11″N 2°9′41″W
Result	Yorkist victory

Belligerents
House of York	House of Lancaster

Commanders and leaders
Edward IV; Duke of Gloucester; Baron Hastings	Prince Edward †; Duke of Somerset (executed); Earl of Devon †; Baron Wenlock †

Strength
5,000–6,000 men	Approx. 6,000 men

Casualties and losses
Unknown	2,000
- Location within England

The Battle of Tewkesbury (4 May 1471) was one of the most decisive battles of the Wars of the Roses in England. King Edward IV and his forces loyal to the House of York completely defeated those of the rival House of Lancaster. The Lancastrian heir to the throne, Edward of Westminster, Prince of Wales, and many prominent Lancastrian nobles were killed during the battle or executed after it. The Lancastrian king, Henry VI, who was a prisoner in the Tower of London, died shortly after the battle, likely murdered, although the official cause was stated as being of 'great melancholy'. Tewkesbury restored political stability to England until the death of Edward IV in 1483.

== Background ==
The term Wars of the Roses refers to the informal heraldic badges of the two rival houses of Lancaster and York, which had been contending for the English throne since the late 1450s. In 1461 the Yorkist claimant, Edward, Earl of March, was proclaimed King Edward IV and defeated the supporters of the weak, intermittently insane Lancastrian King Henry VI at the Battle of Towton. Lancastrian revolts in the far north of England were defeated in 1464, and the fugitive King Henry was captured and imprisoned the next year. His wife, Margaret of Anjou, and their 13-year-old son Edward of Westminster, Prince of Wales were exiled and impoverished in France. Edward IV's hold on the throne appeared to be secure, at least temporarily.

Edward owed his victory in large measure to the support of his cousin, the powerful 16th Earl of Warwick. They became estranged when Edward spurned the French diplomatic marriage that Warwick was seeking for him and instead married Elizabeth Woodville, widow of an obscure Lancastrian gentleman, in secret in 1464.

When the marriage became public knowledge, Edward placed many of his new queen's family in powerful positions that Warwick had hoped to control. Edward, meanwhile, reversed Warwick's policy of friendship with France by marrying his sister Margaret to Charles the Bold, the Duke of Burgundy. The embittered Warwick secured the support of Edward IV's brother George Plantagenet, 1st Duke of Clarence, for a coup in exchange for Warwick's promise to crown Clarence king. Although Edward was imprisoned briefly, Clarence was unacceptable as monarch to most of the country. Edward was allowed to resume his rule, outwardly reconciled with Warwick and Clarence. Within a year, though, he accused them of fresh treachery and forced them to flee to France.

== Readeption of Henry VI ==
With no hope of a reconciliation with King Edward, Warwick's best hope of regaining power in England lay in restoring Henry VI to the throne. Louis XI of France feared a hostile alliance of Burgundy under Charles the Bold and England under Edward. He was prepared to support Warwick with men and money, but to give legitimacy to any uprising by Warwick, the acquiescence of Margaret of Anjou was required. Warwick and Margaret were previously sworn enemies, but her attendants (in particular Sir John Fortescue, formerly Chief Justice during Henry VI's reign) and Louis eventually persuaded her to ally the House of Lancaster with Warwick.

At Angers Warwick begged her pardon on his knees for all past wrongs done to her, and was forgiven. Prince Edward was betrothed to Warwick's younger daughter Anne (the marriage was eventually solemnised at Amboise on 13 December 1470 but may not have been consummated, as Margaret was seeking a better match for Edward once he was king). Finally they swore loyalty to Henry VI on a fragment of the True Cross in Angers Cathedral. However, Margaret declined to let Prince Edward land in England or to land there herself until Warwick had established a firm government and made the country safe for them.

Warwick landed in the West Country on 13 September 1470, accompanied by Clarence and some unswerving Lancastrian nobles, including the Earl of Oxford and Jasper Tudor, the Earl of Pembroke. As King Edward made his way south to face Warwick, he realised that Warwick's brother John, Marquess of Montagu, who had up until then remained loyal to Edward, had defected at the head of a large army in the north of England. Edward fled to King's Lynn, where he took ship for Flanders, part of Burgundy, accompanied only by his youngest brother Richard of Gloucester and a few faithful adherents.

In London Warwick released King Henry, led him in procession to Saint Paul's cathedral, and installed him in Westminster palace. Warwick's position nevertheless remained precarious. His alliance with Louis of France and his intention to declare war on Burgundy was contrary to the interests of the merchants, as it threatened English trade with Flanders and the Netherlands. Clarence had long been excluded from Warwick's calculations. In November 1470 Parliament declared that Prince Edward and his (putative) descendants were Henry's heirs to the throne; Clarence would become king only if the Lancastrian line of succession failed. Unknown to Warwick, Clarence secretly became reconciled with his brother, King Edward.

== Edward's landing and the death of Warwick ==
With Warwick in power in England, it was Charles of Burgundy's turn to fear a hostile alliance of England and France. As an obvious counter to Warwick, he supplied King Edward with money (50,000 florins), ships, and several hundred men (including handgunners). Edward set sail from Flushing on 11 March 1471 with 36 ships and 1,200 men. He touched briefly on the English coast at Cromer but found that the Duke of Norfolk, who might have supported him, was away from the area and that Warwick controlled that part of the country. Instead, his ships made for Ravenspurn, near the mouth of the River Humber, where Henry Bolingbroke had landed in 1399 on his way to reclaim the Duchy of Lancaster and ultimately depose Richard II.

Edward's landing was inauspicious at first; the ships were scattered by bad weather and his men landed in small detachments over a wide area on 14 March. The port of Kingston-upon-Hull refused to allow Edward to enter, so he made for York, claiming rather like Bolingbroke that he was seeking only the restoration of the Duchy of York. He then began to march south. Near Pontefract Castle he evaded the troops of Warwick's brother Montagu. By the time Edward reached the town of Warwick he had gathered enough supporters to proclaim himself king again. The Earl of Warwick sent urgent requests for Queen Margaret, who was gathering fresh forces in France, to join him in England. He himself was at Coventry, preparing to bar Edward's way to London, while Montagu hastened up behind the king's army.

Edward, however, knew that Clarence was ready to turn his coat once again and betray Warwick, his father-in-law. He marched rapidly west and joined with Clarence's men, who were approaching from Gloucestershire. Clarence appealed to Warwick to surrender, but Warwick refused to even speak to him. Edward's army made rapidly for London, pursued by Warwick and Montagu. London was supposedly defended by the 4th Duke of Somerset, but he was absent and the city readily admitted Edward. The unfortunate and by now feeble Henry VI was sent back to the Tower of London. Edward then turned about to face Warwick's approaching army. On 14 April, they met at the Battle of Barnet. In a confused fight in thick fog, some of Warwick's army attacked each other by mistake, and at the cries of "Treachery!" his army disintegrated and was routed. Montagu died in the battle and Warwick was cut down trying to reach his horse to escape.

== The Tewkesbury campaign ==
Urged on by Louis XI, Margaret finally sailed on 24 March. Storms forced her ships back to France several times, and she and Prince Edward finally landed at Weymouth in Dorsetshire on the same day the Battle of Barnet was fought. While Margaret sheltered at nearby Cerne Abbey, the Duke of Somerset brought news of the disaster at Barnet to her. She briefly wished to return to France, but Prince Edward persuaded her to gamble for victory. Somerset and the Earl of Devon had already raised an army for Lancaster in the West Country. Their best hope was to march northward and join forces with the Lancastrians in Wales, led by Jasper Tudor. Other Lancastrian forces could be relied upon to distract King Edward; in particular, a fleet under Warwick's relation, the Bastard of Fauconberg, was preparing to descend on Kent, where the Nevilles and Warwick, in particular, had always been popular.

In London King Edward had learned of Margaret's landing only two days after she arrived. Although he had given many of his supporters and troops leave after the victory at Barnet, he was nonetheless able to rapidly muster a substantial force at Windsor, just west of London. It was difficult at first to determine Margaret's intentions, as the Lancastrians had sent out several feints that suggested they might be making directly for London, but Edward's army set out for the West Country within a few days.

On 30 April Margaret's army had reached Bath, on its way towards Wales. She turned aside briefly to secure guns, reinforcements, and money from the city of Bristol. On the same day King Edward reached Cirencester. On hearing that Margaret was at Bristol, he turned south to meet her army. However, the Lancastrians made a feint towards Little Sodbury, about 12 miles (19 km) north-east of Bristol. Nearby was Sodbury Hill, an Iron Age hill fort that was an obvious strategic point for the Lancastrians to seize. When Yorkist scouts reached the hill there was a sharp fight in which they suffered heavy casualties. Believing that the Lancastrians were about to offer battle, Edward temporarily halted his army while the stragglers caught up and the remainder could rest after their rapid march from Windsor. However, the Lancastrians instead made a swift move north by night, passing within 3 miles (4.8 km) of Edward's army. By the morning of 2 May, they had gained the safety of Berkeley Castle and had a head start of 15 miles (24 km) over Edward.

King Edward realized that the Lancastrians were seeking to cross the River Severn into Wales. The nearest crossing point they could use was at the city of Gloucester. He sent urgent messages to the governor, Sir Richard Beauchamp, ordering him to bar the gates to Margaret and man the city's defences. When Margaret arrived on the morning of 3 May, Beauchamp refused her summons to let her army pass, and she realized that there was insufficient time to storm the city before Edward's army arrived. Instead, her army made another forced march of 10 miles (16 km) to Tewkesbury, attempting to reach the next bridge at Upton-upon-Severn, 7 miles (11 km) further on. Edward meanwhile had marched no less than 31 miles (50 km), passing through Cheltenham (then little more than a village) in the late afternoon. The day was very hot, and both the Lancastrians and Edward's pursuing army were exhausted. The Lancastrians were forced to abandon some of their artillery, which was captured by Yorkist reinforcements following from Gloucester.

At Tewkesbury, the tired Lancastrians halted for the night. Most of their army were footmen and unable to continue further without rest, and even the mounted troops were weary. By contrast, King Edward's army was composed mainly of mounted men, who nevertheless dismounted to fight on foot as most English armies did during this period. Hearing from his "prickers" or mounted scouts of Margaret's position, Edward drove his army to make another march of 6 miles (9.7 km) from Cheltenham, finally halting 3 miles (4.8 km) from the Lancastrians. The Lancastrians knew they could retreat no further before Edward attacked their rear, and that they would be forced to give battle.

== Battle ==
=== Lancastrian positions ===
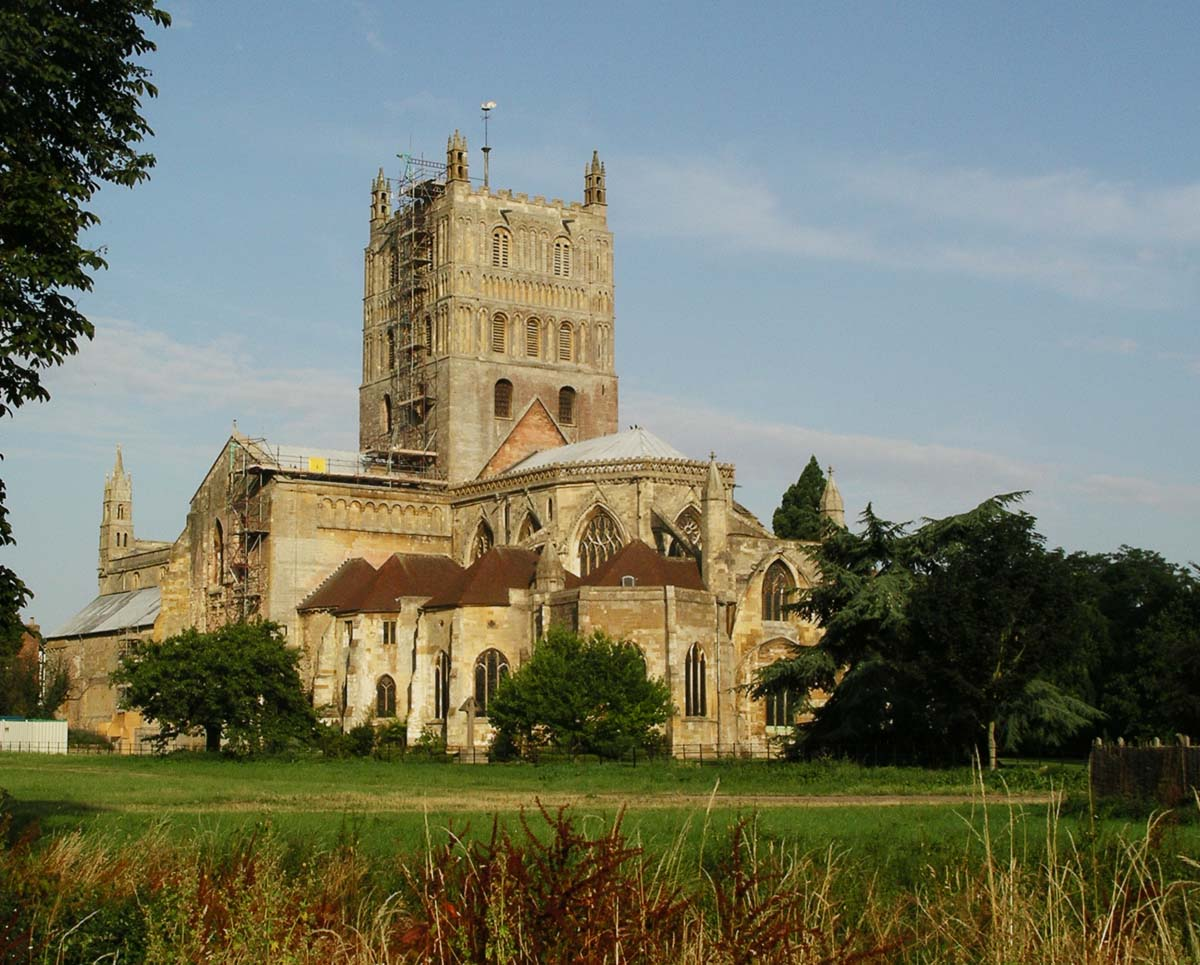
Tewkesbury Abbey in Gloucestershire

As day broke on 4 May, the Lancastrians took up a defensive position a mile south of the town of Tewkesbury. To their rear were the River Avon and the Severn. Tewkesbury Abbey was just behind the Lancastrian centre. A farmhouse then known as Gobes Hall marked the centre of the Lancastrian position; nearby was "Margaret's camp", earthworks of uncertain age. Queen Margaret is said to have spent the night at Gobes Hall, before hastily taking refuge on the day of battle in a religious house some distance from the battlefield. The main strength of the Lancastrians' position was provided by the ground in front, which was broken up by hedges, woods, embankments, and "evil lanes". This was especially true on their right.

The Lancastrian army numbered approximately 6,000, likely outnumbering the Yorkists by only a few hundred. As was customary at the time, it was organised into three "battles". The right battle was commanded by the Duke of Somerset. A stream, the Colnbrook, flowed through his position, making some of the ground difficult to traverse. The Lancastrian centre was commanded by Lord Wenlock and supported by Richard Mustoe commanding the vanguard. Unlike the other principal Lancastrian commanders, Wenlock had deserted the Lancastrian cause after the First Battle of Saint Albans, only to revert to the Lancastrians when he was deprived of the Lieutenancy of Calais. Prince Edward was present with the centre. At 17 Prince Edward was no stranger to battlefields, having been given by his mother the task of condemning to death Yorkist prisoners taken at the Second Battle of St Albans, but he lacked experience of actual command. The left battle was commanded by the Earl of Devon, another devoted Lancastrian. His battle, and part of the centre, occupied a low ridge known locally as the "Gastons". A small river, the Swilgate, protected Devon's left flank, before curving behind the Lancastrian position to join the Avon.

=== Edward's moves ===
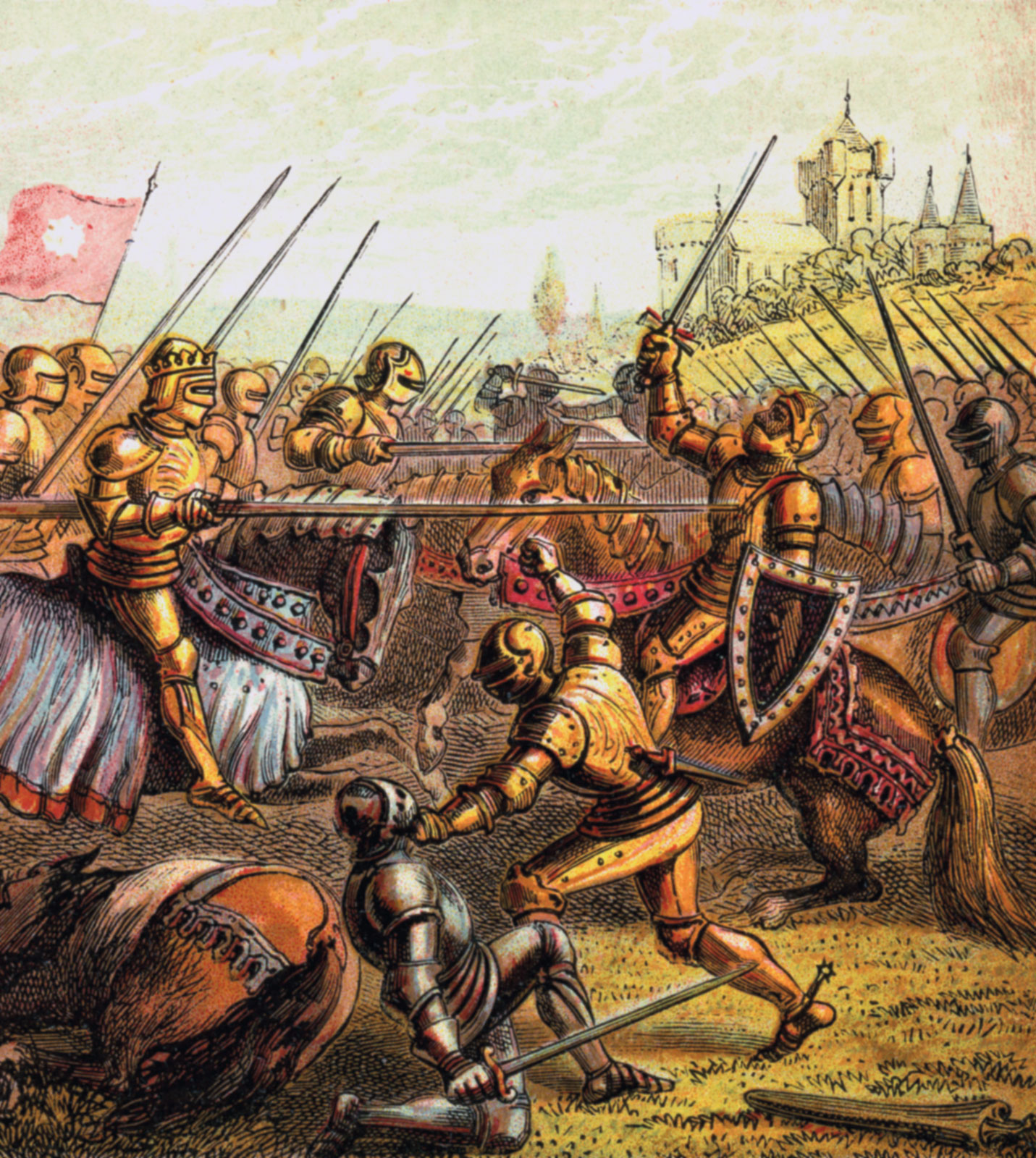
1868 depiction of the battle, Pictures of English History

The Yorkists numbered around 5,000–6,000 men. Like the Lancastrians, King Edward organised his army into three battles.

Edward's vanguard was commanded by his youngest brother, Richard, Duke of Gloucester. Although he was only 18 years old, Richard was already an experienced commander and had led a division at the Battle of Barnet. Edward himself commanded the main battle, in which Clarence was also stationed. Edward was 29 years old and at the height of his prowess as a soldier. His lifelong friend and supporter Lord Hastings commanded the rear. He also was an experienced commander and, like Richard, had accompanied Edward into exile in the Low Countries and had led a battle at Barnet.

Although by tradition the vanguard occupied the right of the line of battle, several authors have conjectured from descriptions in near-contemporary accounts (such as the Historie of the arrivall of Edward IV) that Richard of Gloucester's division actually took position to the left of Edward's battle or that the divisions of Edward's army advanced in line ahead, with Edward's division leading.

Edward made one other important tactical disposition. To the left of his army was a thickly wooded park. Concerned that hidden Lancastrians might attack from this quarter, he ordered 200 mounted spearmen to occupy part of the woods and prevent the Lancastrians making use of them, or act on their own initiative if they were not themselves attacked. He then "displayed his bannars: dyd blowe up the trompets: commytted his caws and qwarell to Almyghty God, to owr most blessyd lady his mother: Vyrgyn Mary, the glorious Seint George, and all the saynts: and advaunced, directly upon his enemyes."

=== Action ===
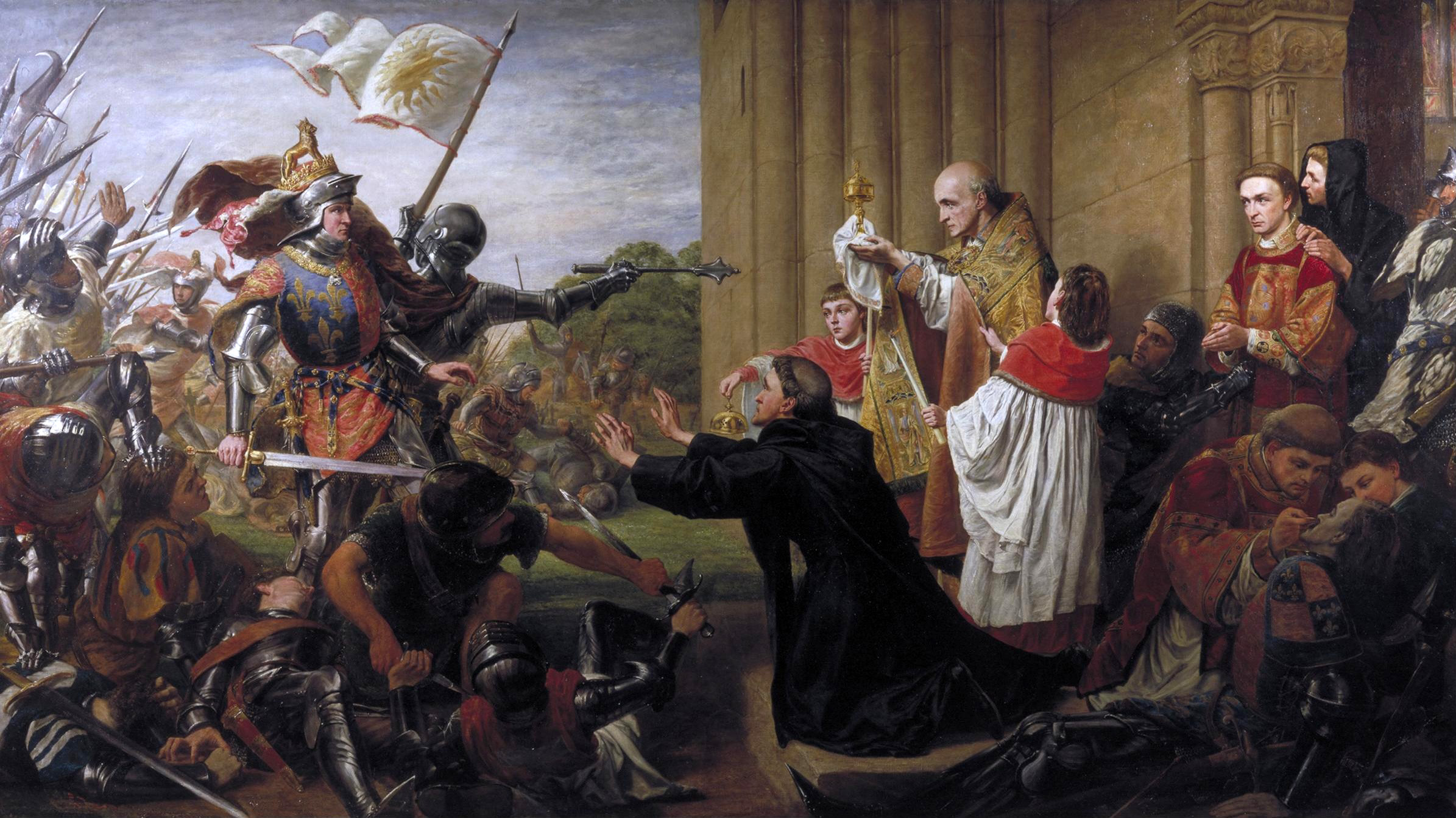
Sanctuary by Richard Burchett, 1867, in the Guildhall Art Gallery, London

As they moved towards the Lancastrian position, King Edward's army found that the ground was so broken up by woods, ditches, and embankments that it was difficult to attack in any sort of order. However, the Yorkist archers and artillery showered the Lancastrians with arrows and shot. The Yorkists certainly had more guns than their enemies, and they were apparently better served.

Either to escape the cannonade and volleys of archery or because he saw an opportunity to outflank King Edward's isolated battle, the Duke of Somerset led at least part of his men via some of the "evil lanes" to attack Edward's left flank. Although taken by surprise, Edward's men resisted stoutly, beating back Somerset's attack among the hedges and banks. At the vital moment, the 200 spearmen Edward had earlier posted in the woods far out on the left attacked Somerset from his own right flank and rear, as Gloucester's battle also joined in the fighting.

Somerset's battle was routed, and his surviving troops tried to escape across the Severn. Most were cut down as they fled. The long meadow astride the Colnbrook leading down to the river is known to this day as "Bloody Meadow". Somerset galloped up to Wenlock, commanding the centre, and demanded to know why Wenlock had failed to support him. According to legend (recounted in Edward Hall's chronicle, written several years afterwards though from first-hand accounts), he did not wait for an answer but dashed out Wenlock's brains with a battleaxe before seeking sanctuary in the Abbey.

As its morale collapsed, the rest of the Lancastrian army tried to flee, but the Swilgate became a deadly barrier. Many who succeeded in crossing it converged on a mill south of the town of Tewkesbury and a weir in the town itself, where there were crossings over the Avon. Here, too, many drowned or were killed by their pursuers.

=== Aftermath of the battle ===
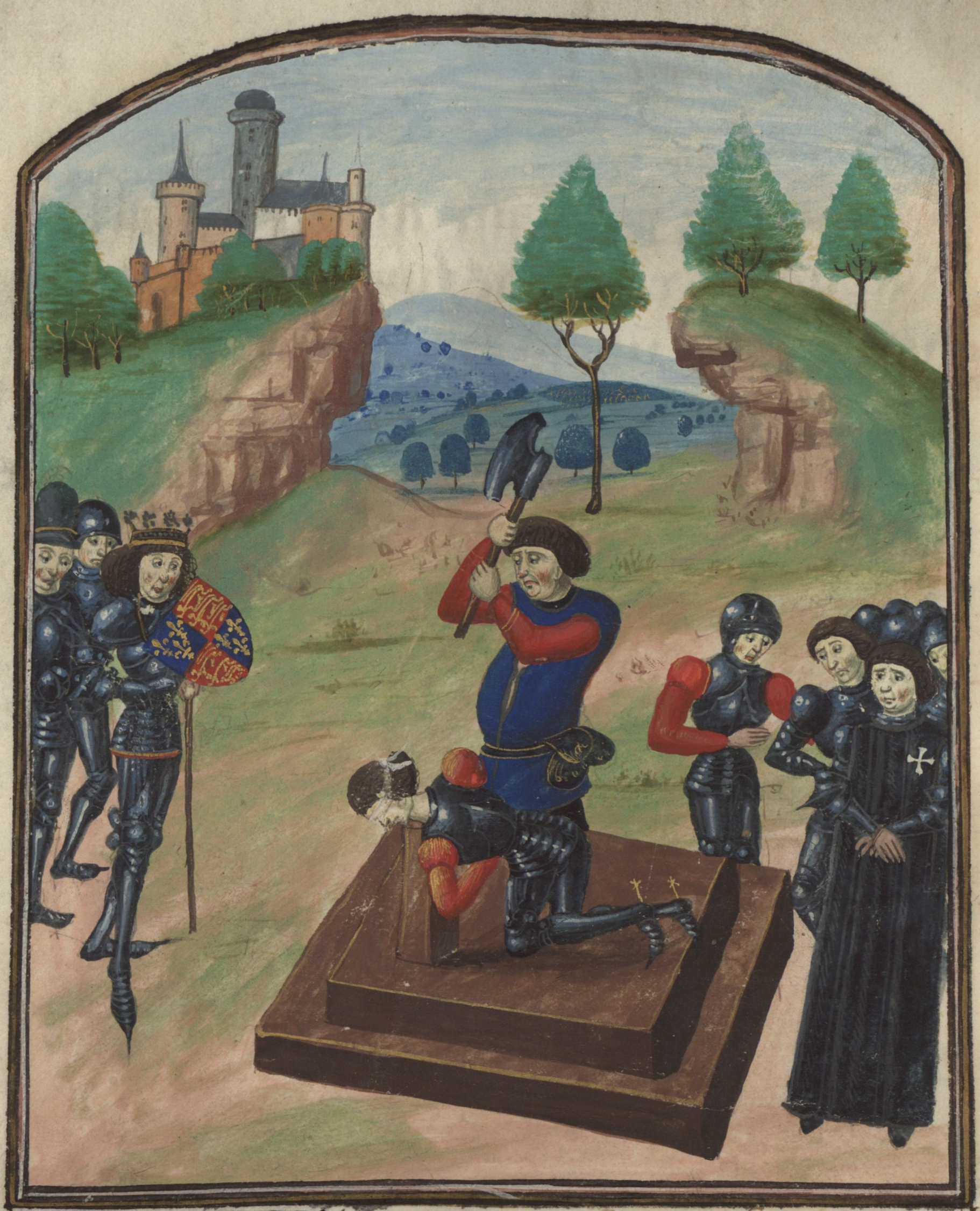
The execution of the Duke of Somerset after the battle

Among the leading Lancastrians who died on the field were Somerset's younger brother John Beaufort, Marquess of Dorset, and the Earl of Devon. The Prince of Wales was slain on the field during the retreat by some of Clarence's men, despite pleading for help from Clarence, who had sworn allegiance to him in France barely a year before.

Many of the other Lancastrian nobles and knights sought sanctuary in Tewkesbury Abbey. King Edward attended prayers in the Abbey shortly after the battle. He granted permission for the Prince of Wales and others slain in the battle to be buried within the Abbey or elsewhere in the town without being quartered as traitors as was customary. However, two days after the battle, Somerset and other leaders were dragged out of the Abbey and ordered by Gloucester and the Duke of Norfolk to be put to death after perfunctory trials. Among them were Hugh Courtenay, cousin of the Earls of Devon, and Sir John Langstrother, the prior of the military order of St. John. The Abbey was not officially a sanctuary. It had to be reconsecrated a month after the battle, following the violence done within its precincts.

A few days later Queen Margaret sent word to Edward from her refuge that she was "at his commandment".

== Fauconberg's repulse ==
Edward was unable to rest after the battle. Lancastrians under Jasper Tudor were still active in Wales, and there was an ineffective rising in the North. Edward went to Coventry in the Midlands to make dispositions against the northern and Welsh Lancastrians, and give his army three days' rest. The most dangerous Lancastrian force, however, was that commanded by the Bastard of Fauconberg. As anticipated, he had landed at Sandwich and rapidly recruited a force from among the pro-Neville Kentishmen. Together with exiled Lancastrians and freebooters from several countries, his army may have numbered 16,000 or even 17,000 in total.

On 14 May, he attacked London from the south. His men burned part of the suburb of Southwark, but were beaten back at London Bridge. The next day, they attacked Aldgate and Bishopsgate from the east. The garrison of the Tower of London, led by Earl Rivers, Queen Elizabeth's brother, who had been injured at Barnet, repulsed them. Citizens defending their property undoubtedly played a major role.

Had Fauconberg succeeded in capturing the city, he might also have captured Edward's wife and their children and released King Henry from the Tower. However, on hearing that Edward's army was approaching, he retreated to Sandwich. Like Margaret, he appeared to be dispirited by the news of Tewkesbury and the Prince's death, and later rather tamely surrendered himself and his ships. He was executed five months later after attempting to escape from custody.

== End of the Lancastrian royal family ==
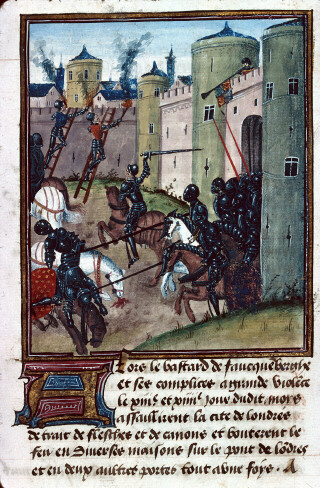
Yorkist defenders of London sally against Fauconberg’s besieging force.

On his way to suppress Fauconberg and the Kentish rebels, Edward passed through London in triumph on 21 May, with the captive Queen Margaret beside him in a chariot. King Henry VI died in the Tower of London that night, at the hands of or by the order of Richard of Gloucester according to several near contemporary accounts. However, the most contemporary account only states that Gloucester was there 'along with many others' and the murder was almost certainly on the orders of the new king, Edward IV. The deposed king's death was announced in public that he had died "of pure displeasure and melancholy", but few believed this.

Gloucester later married Anne Neville, the younger daughter of Warwick and the widow of Henry and Margaret's son Edward.

With the deaths of Somerset and his younger brother, the House of Beaufort, who were distant cousins of Henry VI and had a remote claim to succeed him, had been almost exterminated. Only the female line of Somerset's uncle, the 1st Duke of Somerset, remained, represented by Lady Margaret Beaufort and her son Henry Tudor (later King Henry VII). Henry escaped from Wales with Jasper Tudor, his paternal uncle, and remained in exile in Brittany for the remainder of Edward's reign. The year after the Battle of Tewkesbury, however, Lady Margaret married Lord Stanley, one of King Edward's supporters, who later turned against Edward's brother Richard of Gloucester when he became king as Richard III and was instrumental in putting Henry Tudor on the throne.

== Re-enactment ==
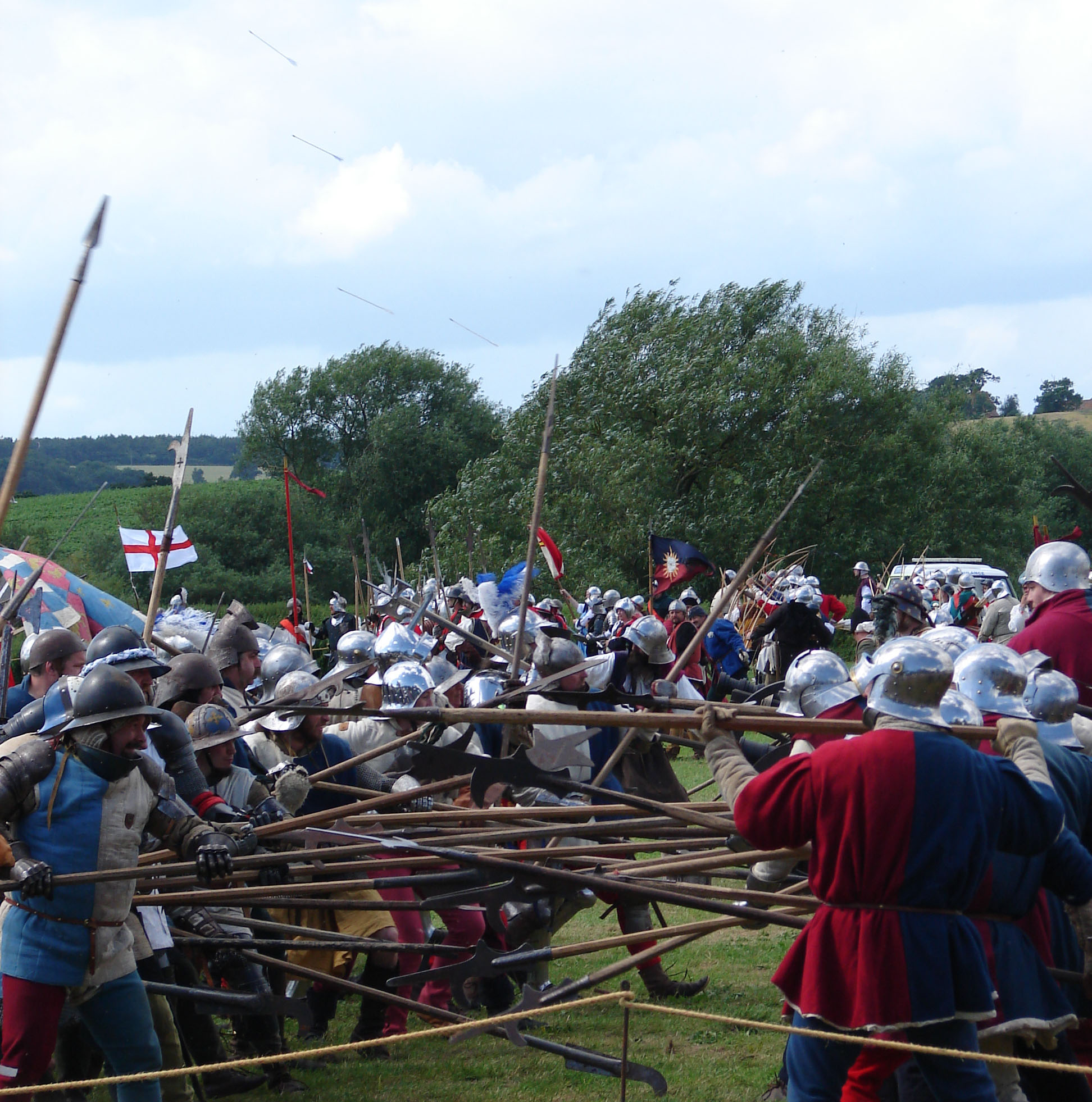
Arrows fly at a battle re-enactment at the Tewkesbury Medieval Festival in 2009

Every year the battle is re-enacted on the second whole weekend in July at the Tewkesbury Medieval Festival. The event (founded in 1984) is one of the largest events of its kind in Europe, attracting enthusiasts from all over the world.

== Monument ==
The Tewkesbury Battlefield Society erected a monument to the battle in the form of two sculptures 5 metres (16 ft) high, of a victorious mounted knight and a defeated horse. Titled Arrivall after the contemporary account of the battle, the work was created by Phil Bews out of green oak wood felled in Gloucestershire, and was dedicated on the anniversary of the battle in 2014.

== Sources ==
- Churchill, Winston (1956). A History of the English-Speaking Peoples. Vol. 1. Cassell. ISBN 0-304-29500-0.
- English Heritage (1995). "English Heritage Battlefield Report: Tewkesbury 1471" (PDF). Archived from the original (PDF) on 1 August 2014.
- Goodchild, Steven J. (2005). Tewkesbury: Eclipse of the House of Lancaster – 1471. Barnsley: Pen & Sword Military. ISBN 1-84415-190-5.
- Gravett, Christopher (2003). Tewkesbury 1471: The last Yorkist victory (PDF). Oxford: Osprey Publishing. ISBN 1-84176-514-7. Archived from the original (PDF) on 27 February 2019.
- Rowse, A.L. (1966). Bosworth Field & the Wars of the Roses. Wordsworth Military Library. ISBN 1-85326-691-4.
- Royle, Trevor (2009). The Road to Bosworth Field. Little, Brown. ISBN 978-0-316-72767-9.
- Warner, Philip (1972). British Battlefields: The South. Fontana. ISBN 0-00-633822-4.
- Weir, Alison (1996). The Wars of the Roses. Ballantyne. ISBN 978-0-345-40433-6.
