= Henry Beaufort, 3rd Duke of Somerset =

15th-century English noble

The Duke of Somerset
- Coat of arms of Beaufort
- Born: 26 January 1436
- Died: 15 May 1464 (aged 28)
- Noble family: House of Beaufort
- Issue: Charles Somerset, 1st Earl of Worcester (legitimised)
- Father: Edmund Beaufort, 2nd Duke of Somerset
- Mother: Lady Eleanor Beauchamp

Henry Beaufort, 3rd Duke of Somerset (26 January 1436 – 15 May 1464) was an English nobleman and army commander for the House of Lancaster during the English Wars of the Roses. He is sometimes numbered the 2nd Duke of Somerset, because the title was re-created for his father after his uncle died. He also held the subsidiary titles of 5th Earl of Somerset, 2nd Marquess of Dorset and 2nd Earl of Dorset.

== Biography ==
Somerset, born about January 1436, was the son of Edmund Beaufort, 2nd Duke of Somerset, and Eleanor, daughter of Richard Beauchamp, 13th Earl of Warwick and widow of Thomas, fourteenth baron Roos of Hamlake. (Note: Thus Somerset was a maternal nephew of Lady Anne Beauchamp, Countess of Warwick. He was a paternal second cousin to Lady Margaret Beaufort and Richard Neville, 16th Earl of Warwick (the "Kingmaker"). Somerset was also an uncle to Henry Stafford, 2nd Duke of Buckingham.) From 1443 to 1448 Henry was styled Count of Mortain or Morteign, and from 1448 to 1455 Earl of Dorset. While still a youth he fought at the First Battle of St Albans (1455), where he was wounded and his father was killed; thereby he inherited the title of 3rd Duke of Somerset.

He was regarded as "the hope of the [Lancastrian] party", but he also inherited the "enmities entailed upon him by his father's name". He was brought to the council at Coventry, where in October 1456 an effort was made to reconcile the two parties; but the meeting was disturbed by quarrels between Somerset and Richard Neville, 16th Earl of Warwick, and by a brawl between Somerset's men and the town watch of Coventry. In 1457 Queen Margaret of Anjou suggested a marriage between Somerset and his cousin Joan, sister of James II of Scotland, but the proposal came to nothing. On 14 October of that year Somerset was made lieutenant of the Isle of Wight and warden of Carisbrooke Castle. Early in 1458 he took part in the council at London which again endeavoured to effect a political reconciliation, and it was agreed that Richard, Duke of York should pay the widowed Duchess of Somerset and her children an annual pension of five thousand marks as compensation for the death of the 2nd Duke. He then participated in The Love Day with the King, Queen and other leading nobles.

The truce, however, was hollow; Margaret continued to intrigue against York, and in October 1458 proposed that Somerset should be appointed captain of Calais in place of Warwick. War broke out in 1459, and Somerset nearly encountered Warwick at Coleshill just before the Battle of Blore Heath. After the defeat of Lancastrians at Blore Heath and before the Lancastrian victory at Ludford Bridge, he was on 9 October nominated captain of Calais. He crossed the Channel and was refused admittance to Calais by Warwick's adherents, but made himself master of the outlying fortress of Guisnes (appointing Andrew Trollope its bailiff). Somerset fought several skirmishes with the Yorkists between Calais and Guisnes until on 23 April 1460 he suffered a decisive reverse at the Battle of Newnham Bridge (called Pont de Neullay by the French).

During his absence the Yorkists had won the Battle of Northampton, but Somerset joined the Lancastrians at Pontefract in December 1460, captured a portion of the Yorkist forces at Worksop on 21 December, and won the Lancastrian victory at the Battle of Wakefield on 30 December. He marched south with Margaret and fought at the Second Battle of St Albans (17 February 1461). This second victory was not followed up; the Lancastrians retired north, and on 29 March Edward IV won the Battle of Towton (29 March 1461). Somerset escaped from the battlefield, and in the following July was sent by Margaret to seek aid from Charles VII of France. Charles died before their arrival, but his son and successor Louis XI summoned Somerset to Tours and sent him back in March 1462 laden with promises of support, but with very little else.

Somerset now began to consider making his peace with Edward IV. He had been attainted by Parliament on 4 November 1461, and most of his lands had been granted to Edward's brother Richard, Duke of Gloucester and other Yorkists. On his return from France he took command of the Lancastrian forces in Scotland while Margaret went to France, and in the autumn of 1462 he was holding Bamburgh Castle for the Lancastrians. On 24 December, however, he and Sir Ralph Percy, the Governor of Bamburgh Castle, surrendered the castle and submitted to King Edward. The king took him to London, and treated him with marked favour. He received a general pardon on 10 March 1462/1463, and was restored to his dignities by an act of the Parliament which met on 29 April following.

Somerset, however, soon returned to his old allegiance. Early in 1464 he escaped from Holt Castle in North Wales, where he seems to have been kept in some sort of confinement, and after nearly being recaptured made his way to Margaret on the borders. The Lancastrians now made one more effort to recover the crown, but at the Battle of Hexham on 15 May 1464 they were utterly defeated by John Neville, 1st Marquess of Montagu. Somerset was captured in a barn at the site of what is now known as Dukes House, and beheaded shortly afterwards that same day. He was buried at Hexham Abbey. (Note: Traditionally his helmet from the battle was kept within Hexham Abbey from which it was taken by Colonel John Fenwick for use in the English Civil War. After Fenwick's death at battle of Marston Moor the helmet was retrieved along with his skull, both were returned to the Abbey. The helmet is currently on display in Hexham Old Gaol museum.) Parliament annulled the act restoring him to his dignities, which again became forfeit and were never restored. Somerset was unmarried, and his younger brother, Edmund Beaufort, was styled 4th Duke of Somerset by the Lancastrians.

In 1485, some twenty-one years after his death, Somerset, along with Jasper Tudor, had all acts of attainder against him annulled in the first Parliament of Henry VII, "for their true and faithfull Allegeaunces and Services doune to the said blessed King Herrie [VI]."

== Character ==
Somerset was described by the Burgundian poet Georges Chastellain as "un très grand seigneur et un des plus beaulx josnes chevaliers qui fust au royaume anglais" ("A very great lord and one of the most handsome young knights in the English kingdom").

== Illegitimate progeny ==
By his mistress Joan Hill he had an illegitimate son:

- Charles Somerset, 1st Earl of Worcester, 1st Baron Herbert (c.1460-1526), KG, who was given the surname "Somerset" and was created Baron Herbert in 1506 and Earl of Worcester in 1513. From him descend the Earls and Marquesses of Worcester and the Dukes of Beaufort, who are the last known surviving male-line descendants of King Henry II (1154-1189) of England, Count of Anjou, founder of the Plantagenet dynasty, of which King Richard III (1483-1485) was the last ruling member in the male line.

== Ancestry ==
Ancestors of Henry Beaufort, 3rd Duke of Somerset

8. John of Gaunt, 1st Duke of Lancaster
4. John Beaufort, 1st Earl of Somerset
9. Katherine Swynford
2. Edmund Beaufort, 2nd Duke of Somerset
10. Thomas Holland, 2nd Earl of Kent
5. Margaret Holland
11. Alice FitzAlan
1. Henry Beaufort, 3rd Duke of Somerset
12. Thomas de Beauchamp, 12th Earl of Warwick
6. Richard Beauchamp, 13th Earl of Warwick
13. Margaret Ferrers
3. Eleanor Beauchamp
14. Thomas de Berkeley, 5th Baron Berkeley
7. Elizabeth de Berkeley
15. Margaret de Lisle, 3rd Baroness Lisle

== Notes ==
Peerage of England
| Preceded by Edmund Beaufort | Duke of Somerset; 2nd creation 1455–1464 | Forfeit Title next held by Edmund Beaufort |
