= Edmund Beaufort, 4th Duke of Somerset =

15th-century English nobleman and military commander

Edmund Beaufort
- Duke of Somerset
- Arms of the Dukes of Beaufort

Extinct
- Predecessor: Henry Beaufort, 3rd Duke of Somerset (older brother)
- Successor: None
- Born: c. 1438
- Died: 6 May 1471 (aged 32–33); Tewkesbury, Gloucestershire, England
- Cause of death: Beheading
- Buried: Tewkesbury Abbey
- Noble family: Beaufort
- Spouse: None
- Issue: None
- Father: Edmund Beaufort, 2nd Duke of Somerset
- Mother: Eleanor Beauchamp, Duchess of Somerset

Edmund Beaufort (c. 1438 – 6 May 1471), styled 4th Duke of Somerset, 6th Earl of Somerset, 3rd Marquess of Dorset, 3rd Earl of Dorset, was an English nobleman and military commander during the Wars of the Roses. He supported the Lancastrian King Henry VI. Following the defeat of the Lancastrian faction at the Battle of Tewkesbury, he was executed on the order of the Yorkist king, Edward IV.

== Early life and family ==
Edmund Beaufort, born about 1438, was the second son of Edmund Beaufort, 2nd Duke of Somerset by his wife Eleanor de Beauchamp, a daughter of Richard Beauchamp, 13th Earl of Warwick and widow of Thomas de Roos, 14th Baron Roos of Hamlake. His elder brother was Henry Beaufort, 3rd Duke of Somerset (26 January 1436 – 15 May 1464).

After the defeat of the Lancastrians in 1461, Edmund and his younger brother John Beaufort, Marquess of Dorset took refuge in France. On the execution of his elder brother Henry after the Battle of Hexham in 1464, the Lancastrians asserted that Edmund had succeeded as 4th Duke of Somerset. However, his brother's attainder was never reversed, and his titles remained forfeit. In a proclamation dated 27 April 1471 Edmund is spoken of as "Edmund Beaufort, calling himself duke of Somerset". (Note: Henry Beaufort, 3rd Duke of Somerset, was attainted by Parliament on 4 November 1461, and most of his lands were granted to King Edward IV's brother Richard, Duke of Gloucester, and other Yorkists. Henry Beaufort received a general pardon on 10 March 1463, but after his execution Parliament annulled the act restoring him to his dignities, which again became forfeit and were not restored. So although Edmund Beaufort was styled by supporters of the House of Lancaster as 4th Duke of Somerset, by act of Parliament he had no legitimate right to use the title. In 1485, some twenty-one years after the execution of the 3rd Duke of Somerset, Edmund Beaufort, along with Jasper Tudor, had all acts of attainder against his father annulled in the first Parliament of King Henry VII, "for their true and faithfull Allegeaunces and Services doune to the said blessed King Herrie [VI].")

== Return to England ==
In October 1470 Beaufort returned from France when King Edward IV was driven from the throne after Richard Neville, 16th Earl of Warwick's defection and alliance with Queen Margaret and the restoration of King Henry VI, who was the first monarch ousted by the family feud, and whom due to occasional insanity she assisted in his duties, Somerset was unenthusiastic over the reconciliation and made little effort to co-operate. In fact his failure to hold London against Edward IV was a decisive moment, leading to the Battle of Barnet (14 April 1471) and the death of Warwick. Some sources say he was present at Barnet, but this is an error.

== Battle of Tewkesbury and execution ==
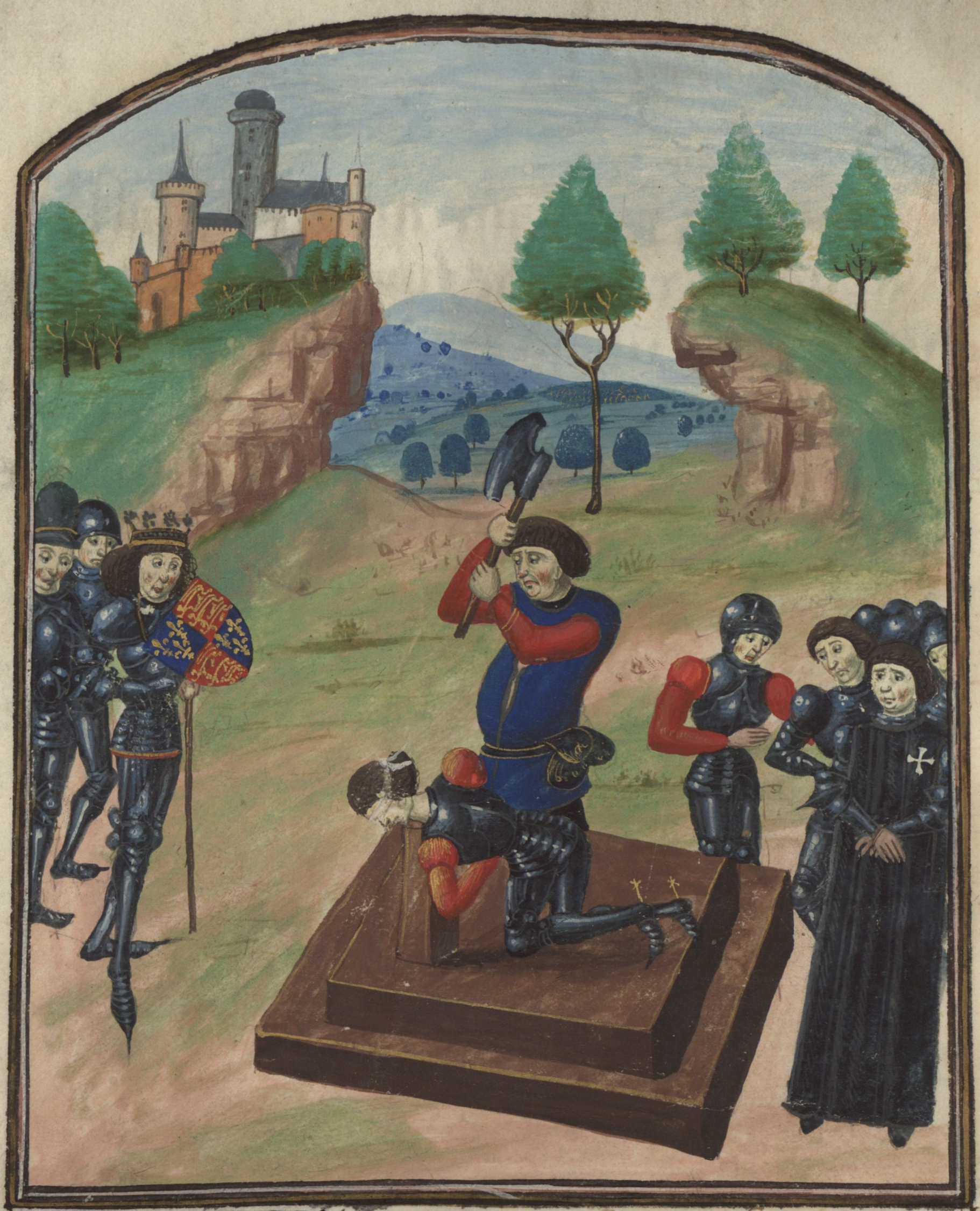
Execution of Edmund Beaufort after Tewkesbury

Fleeing west towards Wales to seek help from Jasper Tudor, but halted by the Yorkist army at the Battle of Tewkesbury (4 May 1471), he commanded the van of the Lancastrian army at the battle. His position was almost unassailable, but under the pressure of Edward's Flemish handgunners, once the battle began Beaufort moved down from the heights and attacked Edward IV's right flank. He was assailed by both the king and Richard, Duke of Gloucester, and was soon put to flight, his conduct having practically decided the battle in favour of the Yorkists.

After the defeat, Somerset and other Lancastrian leaders took refuge in Tewkesbury Abbey, but they were forced from sanctuary two days later. They were tried and executed immediately, at the Cross in the centre of Tewkesbury, on Monday 6 May 1471. He was buried on the south side of Tewkesbury Abbey, under an arch. His younger brother John had been killed during the battle, and as both died unmarried, "the house of Beaufort and all the honours to which they were entitled became extinct".

The murder shortly thereafter of Henry VI left Edmund's 1st cousin, Lady Margaret Beaufort, and her son, Henry Tudor, as the senior representatives of the House of Lancaster.

== Sources ==
- Pollard, Albert Frederick (1901a). "Beaufort, Henry (1436–1464)" . In Lee, Sidney (ed.). Dictionary of National Biography (1st supplement). Vol. I. London: Smith, Elder & Co. pp. 157–158.

Attribution

- This article incorporates text from a publication now in the public domain: Pollard, Albert Frederick (1901). "Beaufort, Edmund (1438?–1471)". In Lee, Sidney (ed.). Dictionary of National Biography (1st supplement). Vol. I. London: Smith, Elder & Co. p. 156. Endnotes:
  - Arrivall of Edward IV and Warkworth's Chron. (Camden Soc.)
  - Hall's Chronicle
  - Polydore Vergil
  - Cal. Patent Polls
  - Stubbs's Const. Hist. iii. 208, 210
  - Ramsay's Lancaster and York, ii. 380–2
  - Doyle's Official Baronage
  - G. E. Cokayne's Complete Peerage
  - Notes and Queries, 4th ser. xii. 29, 276.

Peerage of England
Forfeit Title last held by Henry Beaufort	— TITULAR — Duke of Somerset; 1464–1471	Extinct
