= Bonville–Courtenay feud =

English feud

The Bonville–Courtenay feud of 1455 engendered a series of raids, sieges, and attacks between two major Devon families, the Courtenays and the Bonvilles, in south west England, in the mid-fifteenth century. One of many such aristocratic feuds of the time, it became entwined with national politics due to the political weight of the protagonists. The Courtenay earls of Devon were the traditional powerbrokers in the region, but by this time a local baronial family, the Bonvilles, had become more powerful and rivalled the Courtenays for royal patronage. Eventually this rivalry spilled over into physical violence, including social disorder, murder, and siege.

The Bonville–Courtenay feud is often given as an example of the degree to which law and order and respect for the king had broken down in the provinces. As a result, modern historians have often considered it a cause of the later Wars of the Roses; and indeed, the course of the feud often closely followed the sectarian politics of the day. The feud is perhaps most well known for culminating in an armed encounter at Clyst (called the fight, or sometimes the battle, of Clyst), near Exeter, which resulted in loss of life.

The events at Clyst resulted in government intervention in the politics of the West Country. This was unusual, as the government did not have a good track-record of settling local disputes among the nobility. However, it is likely that this was done for reasons of higher politics; William Bonville was by 1455 a Yorkist, and Richard, Duke of York, had been made Lord Protector. Although in the short term it resulted in Thomas Courtenay, Earl of Devon's, incarceration, the Bonville–Courtenay feud did not come to an effective end until the protagonists were all killed in the early years of the civil wars.

== Background ==
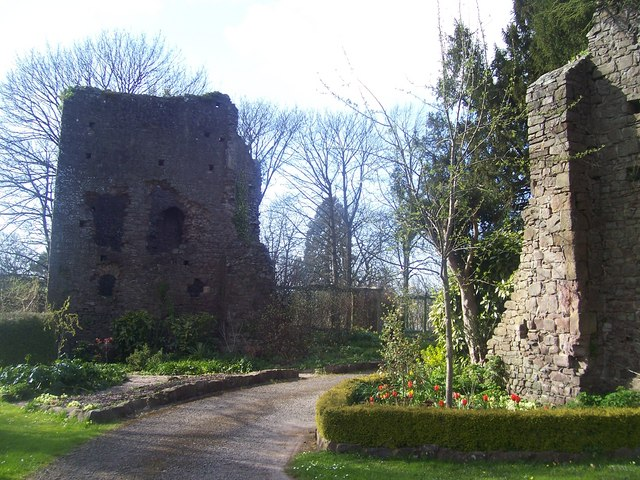
Tiverton Castle ruins, the family seat of the Courtenays

The mid-fifteenth century suffered greatly from the private feuds of the nobility, and the Wars of the Roses in general. Devonshire, whilst experiencing none of the pitched battles, was still ravaged by a private feud. This was between Thomas Courtenay, Earl of Devon, whose family had been earls of that county since 1335 and William Bonville, 1st Baron Bonville. Their feud became inextricably tied to the national political scene, but originated in regional Devon society. In 2003, historian Martin Cherry agreed that the south west was to a great degree lawless at this time. However, he suggested that the Bonville–Courtenay feud, whilst being the best-known, is not the sole example of political upheaval in the region, which was common throughout the century.

=== National context ===
Arms of the Courtenay Earls of Devon

In 1966, historian R. L. Storey suggested that the civil wars which racked England for much of the fifteenth century had their origins in the breakdown of both the king's ability to govern, and law and order in the localities, and gave the Courtenay–Bonville feud as one such example. The king, Henry VI, had been incapacitated by mental illness in August 1453. This led to the recall to court of the recalcitrant Richard, Duke of York, his closest adult relative and a potential claimant to the throne. York had been banished to his estates after a failed rebellion in 1452. The following year, with the king still incapacitated, York was appointed Lord Protector and First Councillor of the realm, for the duration of the king's illness. He used this position to move against his chief rival, the hitherto dominant Edmund Beaufort, Duke of Somerset, who was imprisoned. By Christmas of 1454, King Henry had recovered from his illness, removing the basis for York's authority. Henry and a select council of nobles decided to hold a great council at Leicester. York and his closest allies, his brother-in-law Richard Neville, Earl of Salisbury and Salisbury's son Richard, Earl of Warwick, anticipated that charges might be brought against them at this assembly. They gathered an armed retinue and marched to stop the royal party from reaching Leicester, intercepting them at St Albans. Both militarily and politically it was a complete victory for York and the Nevilles. On 22 May 1455, at the First Battle of St Albans they captured the king and retook their places in government, while York's and the Nevilles' rivals, the Duke of Somerset, the Earl of Northumberland, and Lord Clifford were killed. Among the royalists wounded were the Duke of Buckingham and Somerset's son the Earl of Dorset, the Earl of Devon, and the king's half-brother Jasper Tudor. York was appointed Protector of England, for the second time, by parliament a few months later.

Professor Ralph A. Griffiths places the fault for the feud between the Courtenays and Bonvilles firmly in the lap of King Henry VI, through whose "thoughtless liberality and government carelessness ... personal jealousies in the west country had been exacerbated." However, more recently, Martin Cherry warned against seeing the feud as the same as the later civil wars writ small; they were, he says, "qualitatively" different, resulting in the ultimate disintegration of the earl's affinity, rather than symptomatic of his violence. Michael Hicks has pointed out that although there were many other regional feuds at this time (including the Lisle-Berkeley dispute, also waged in the west country), they did not have the same causes, or were necessarily caused by weak government at all: for instance, whereas the Bonville–Courtenay feud had territorial domination at its root, others, such as the Berkeley–Lisle dispute, were begun over contested inheritances. Cherry has also suggested that the main cause of the Bonville–Courtenay dispute was the desperation of the earl to "gain access to crown patronage for himself and his clients" – something he was gradually failing to do in the face of competition.

=== Local politics ===
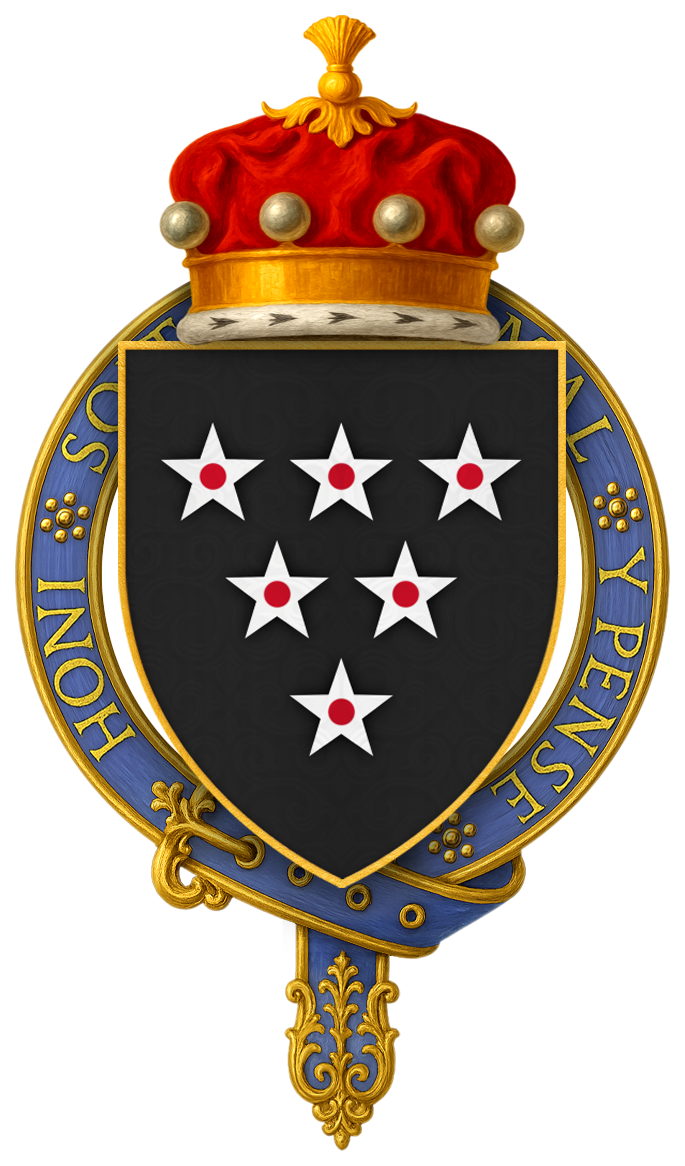
Coat of Arms of Sir William Bonville, 1st Baron Bonville

As noted, the feud between the Bonvilles and Courtenays was rooted in local Devonshire politics. The rivalry between them stemmed from the fact that they were major estate holders in the south west, and further, because both had claims to crown patronage. For example, William Bonville had fought in the Hundred Years' War for both Henry VI and his father, Henry V, whilst Devon through his wife was the king's cousin. Although the earl was both the greatest landowner and the highest ranking nobleman in the county, he had in recent years seen members of the lesser gentry and nobility (such as William Bonville) receive advancement in his stead. Bonville had also furthered his own advancement by successively marrying into the lower nobility (a daughter of the Lord Grey of Ruthin) and then to an aunt of the Earl of Devon himself. The main royal office in the area – and therefore the main source of royal patronage – was the stewardship of the highly profitable Duchy of Cornwall. Both men had held the office alternately over recent years. Tensions between the two have been traced back to 1437, when the stewardship was taken from Courtenay and granted to William Bonville. Courtenay did receive a royal grant of £100 per annum life annuity at this time. But, says Griffiths, this is unlikely to have made up for loss of the main royal office in the county. Certainly, within two years, severe attacks were being launched on Bonville's property, and by 1440, relations between the two were, Griffiths says, "at breaking point." This tension became apparent in open manifestations of military strength; manifestations worrying enough to government to lead to them both being summoned before council. In 1441 the stewardship was returned to the Earl of Devon, although Radford questions whether Bonville actually ever physically surrendered the office, as in November that year an arbitration took place between them to "end all [of their] differences."

There followed a four-year period of peace; but this could simply be accounted for by the fact that Bonville spent that time in service in Gascony, which, it has been suggested, may have been one of the conditions of the arbitration. It was, though, only a temporary peace for the region as by 1449 the earl besieged Bonville (now promoted to the baronage in recognition of his success in France) in his castle of Taunton for a year. Courtenay supported Richard, Duke of York in his 1452 rebellion at Dartford, even joining him in the field against the king. This treason resulted in him forfeiting his royal offices in the south west, including not only the stewardship of the duchy – which was finally granted to Bonville for life – but Lydford Castle, the Forest of Dartmoor, and the Water of Exe. Hence, as his ally the duke was eclipsed in government, Courtenay was eclipsed by Bonville in the south west. Courtenay had – in imitation of his ally – waged a local war against Bonville and Bonville's ally, James Butler, Earl of Wiltshire, between 1451–5. Raising an army of 5–6,000 men, he forced Wiltshire to desert his manor of Lackham, and then returned to the siege of Taunton. The siege was only lifted when the Duke of York arrived unannounced three days later, and took the castle into his own hands, forcing a peace upon the two parties.

Bonville had, then, by April 1455, received much royal favour, including all the offices the earl had lost, as well as the constableship of Exeter Castle. He was – as one historian has called him – "the King's lieutenant in the west." The Earl of Devon had already reacted against this hegemony during the Duke of York's first protectorate (1454–5) and joined the royal council. However, it appears that even the council itself did not trust him to keep the King's peace, as they placed him under a bond of £1,000 to do so. This he had disregarded, and commenced another campaign against Bonville. This time, the Earl of Devon was accompanied by his sons, and, bringing a force of men into Exeter in April 1455, he attempted to ambush Bonville. This resulted in further government-imposed undertakings of good behaviour between the two parties. As the government was now headed by Courtenay's old ally, the Duke of York, it is likely that it was now that the earl decided to reject his alliance with York and give his support to the crown. He fought (and was wounded) at St Albans on 22 May that year, on the side of the king. Bonville, meanwhile, through his wife, was related to the Harrington family of Hornby, Lancashire, who had close links to the Nevilles – his father-in-law was Thomas Harrington, a feoffee and retainer to the Earl of Salisbury. Bonville's new-found Yorkist sympathies seem to have driven the Earl of Devon to even greater violence in the county.

== Murder of Nicholas Radford ==
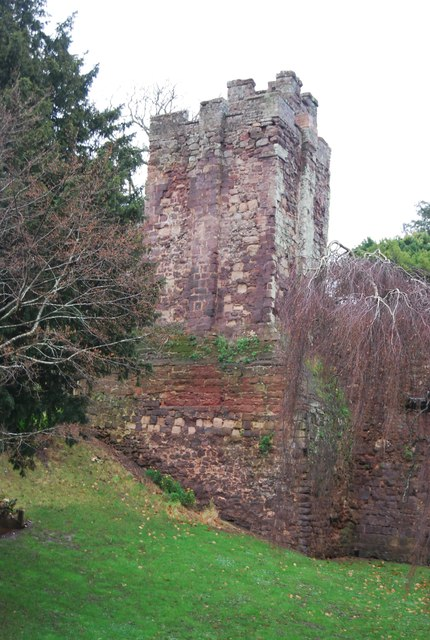
Tower at Exeter castle

From October 1455, Devon and his sons were committing acts of social disorder, seemingly intending to disrupt the administrative machinery of the county (of which Bonville, of course, was a part), for instance by preventing the local justices of the peace from holding quarterly sessions by force; they then proceeded to raise a small army at Tiverton under the leadership of Devon's eldest son, Thomas Courtenay. It was this force that was to be guilty of what R. L. Storey has called "the most notorious private crime of the century," due not only to the violence involved but the fact that it was "so obviously premeditated." This force made its way to Upcott on 23 October 1455, the home of Nicholas Radford, a close associate and legal advisor to Bonville, and a respected member of the community who had previously been recorder of the city of Exeter and member of parliament. Storey has suggested that being an experienced lawyer, he was most probably targeted by Devon and his sons for the very reason that he had aided Bonville's escape from Devon's litigation in the past; and in January 1455 he had enfeoffed Bonville (and others) for land valued at £400.

Thomas Courtenay's force attacked Radford's manor that night; they set fire to the wall and gates to draw him out. On their word, including Courtenay's solemn promise to do him no harm if he would speak with them, Radford let them in – although apparently he commented upon their large number. Whilst Radford and Devon's son drank wine, the latter's followers "ransacked" Radford's house, stealing goods up to the value of 1,000 marks, including all his horses and the sheets off his invalid wife's bed. On a pretext of meeting his father the earl, Courtenay persuaded Radford to accompany him when his force withdrew; however, he abandoned Radford on the road a short distance from the house, and six of Courtenay's men killed him. Devon subsequently dispatched a force to the chapel where Radford's body was; they performed, says Storey, a "mock inquest, one of them acting as coroner and others, with assumed names, as jurors. They brought in a verdict of suicide." They then forced Radford's servants to convey his corpse as if he had been a heretic to the graveyard, where it was deposited unceremoniously into an open grave; the stones laid ready to build his memorial were then dropped on the body, crushing it. By making recognition of the body impossible, this prevented an official inquest being held into Radford's death.

== Following the murder ==
The murder of Nicholas Radford, says R. L. Storey, was only "the curtain raiser" for further military activities. Devon proceeded to raise a force and occupy Exeter – "as if they were the city's lawful garrison" – until just before Christmas, seizing the keys of the city; various houses in the city belonging to Bonville and his supporters were ransacked, and members of the Cathedral were arrested and forced to buy their freedom. In one case, a man was bodily removed from the choir whilst celebrating Mass. Both Bonville and Courtenay had 'extensive relations' with the Cathedral, dating back to the 1430s, but the Courtenays had greatly contributed to its expansion in the previous century. Their actions in 1455 were probably inspired by the fact that Radford had entrusted much of his wealth to the safe-keeping of the church, and Devon saw an opportunity to enrich himself; possibly, says Storey, he was forced to take such action to be able to pay his men. Martin Cherry has pointed to the lack of references to any martial expenses on the earl's behalf in the extant accounts, as indicating that his campaign effectively paid for itself.

During the same period, Devon, "in warlike fashion and like an insurrection" also besieged Powderham Castle, which belonged to his distant cousin and Bonville ally, Sir Philip Courtenay; the latter resisted, and Bonville came to his assistance. Prior to doing this, however, he raided the Earl of Devon's house at Colcombe Castle and proceeded to ransack it. Bonville attempted to lift the siege at Powderham on 19 November, but was repulsed by Devon, and lost two men in the fight, which may have involved up to a thousand men. Meanwhile, Devon continued his attempts to persuade the city of Exeter to raise a force on his behalf – which they refused to do – before leaving Exeter. As Bonville approached, on his way to Powderham. On 15 December 1455, the two forces met at Clyst Heath, just southwest of Exeter.

== Fight at Clyst ==
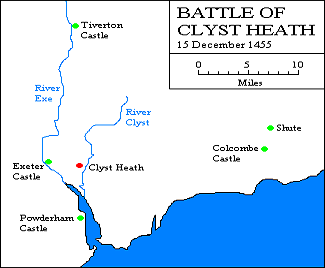
Map of the location of the Clyst engagement, 1455

Devon marched from Exeter to encounter Bonville at Clyst Heath; there are very few extant sources for the event, and only one chronicler provides any details, saying he "departed out of the city with his people into the field of Clyst, and there bickered and fought with the Lord Bonville and put them to flight, and so returned again that night into the city." Many bones were discovered when the site was excavated in 1800, although some, Storey points out, must belong to those killed in the 1549 engagement on the same site. Although difficult to assess the extent to which the engagement can be described as a battle (one chronicler estimated the dead at twelve men) it does appear to have been decisive in Devon's favour. The earl returned to Exeter, where the mayor had "tactfully" laid on a celebration. Hannes Kleineke has described the mayor's decision to illuminate the city walls on the earl's return as "pragmatic", whilst Cherry explains the mayor's behaviour as being due to the fact that the earl, "in his peculiar manner, [had behaved] punctiliously" to the mayor.

The earl subsequently sent a sortie led by Thomas Carrew to attack Bonville's manor at Shute where they faced no resistance and pillaged freely, stealing Bonville's cattle, furnishings, and food. The weeks preceding the battle had been accompanied by what has been called "exchange[s] of formal declarations of war disguised in the chivalric mode of challenges to a duel." Michael Hicks has suggested that, in spite of the earl's clear superiority in numbers, it was Bonville who "goaded the earl into a fair fight," and that "in the spirit of chivalry" the confrontation at Clyst was his fault. Cherry too has suggested that Bonville and Courtenay of Powderham deliberately attempted to recruit members of the earl's historical tenantry, further poisoning relations, and also that, although doubtless the earl has deserved the 'universally bad press' he has received from modern historians, he was still "reluctant to go to war," and that he did so "only after all other methods of achieving his aims ... had failed."

== Response from government ==
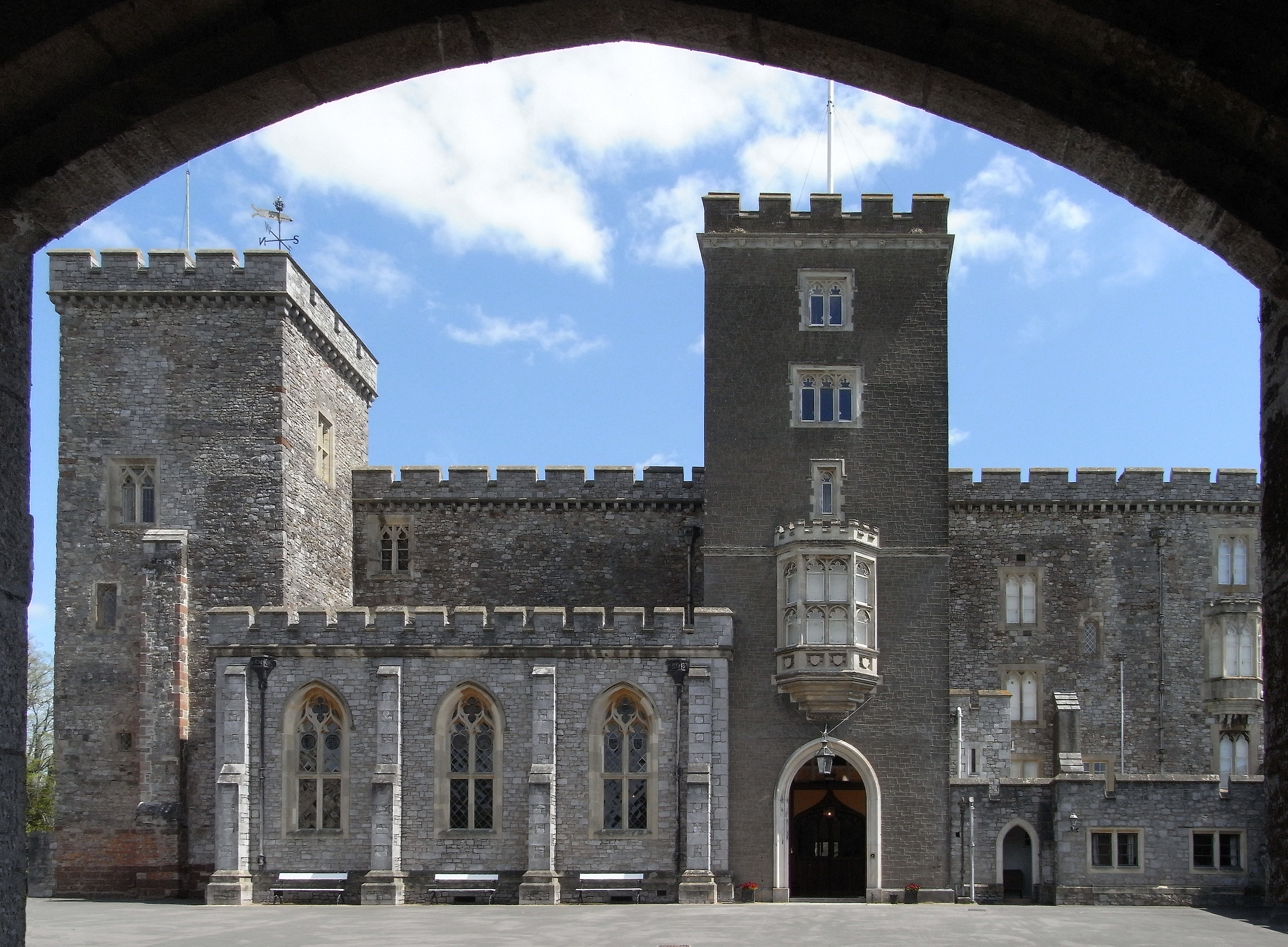
Powderham Castle, west front, viewed from under the Victorian gatehouse. The leftmost tower dates from 1390–1450 as does the main high central block, which originally housed a full-height great hall.

However decisive the Earl of Devon's victory had been, it had also drawn the attention of the government. This was still under the control of Bonville's allies, York, Salisbury, and Warwick, but had up until that point the Yorkists had failed to intervene in this local feud. The feud has been described as an example of local activities influencing parliament itself, and Griffiths said it was used as "a pretext for demanding York's appointment as protector." When parliament reassembled on 12 November it was presented with reports that Devon was leading an army of about 4,000 men and including 400 cavalry to London. The king was still incapacitated. Unable to manage the situation; the Duke of York used the immediate necessity for intervention as a mechanism for being formally appointed Protector. He did not immediately hasten to the south west to punish the Earl of Devon, though. The earl was merely dismissed from his role on the commission of the peace in early December. Soon after, the local gentry were ordered to be ready to assist York. The duke did not set out until news was received of the Clyst confrontation. One chronicler states that following his defeat, Bonville "fled, and came to Grenewiche to the kyng, and the kyng sent him agayne to the lord protectour;" although it is also possible that he was committed to the Fleet Prison for a short time. When finally York left for the south west, he summoned the Earl of Devon to Shaftesbury where the earl was arrested and sent to the Tower of London.

== Aftermath ==
The Earl of Devon remained imprisoned for only a few months. It is possible that an attempt was made to bring him to trial in February, but if so, it was probably – in Storey's words – "countermanded." This could have been, he suggests, indicative of York's "waning" position, as the protectorate was soon to come to an end: Cherry has said that the king's resumption of personal power in February 1456 must have come as "a considerable relief" to the earl. He seems to have taken the Yorkists' eclipse as a further opportunity to continue the feud, which provoked governmental admonishment in March, when his son John Courtenay, with 500 armed men, again prevented the Exeter justices of the peace from sitting, and evicted them. Commissions of oyer and terminer were issued in August, being led by Bonville's ally the Earl of Wiltshire. Although Bonville presented a long list of offences committed by Devon to the council (whilst mitigating his own involvement), the crown "was obviously unimpressed" by this, and eventually not only restored Devon to commission of the peace (12 September 1456) but also pardoned him and his sons for any involvement in the murder of Radford, eventually even appointing him to the lucrative office of keeper of the forest and park of Clarendon. The region subsequently remained quiet; Bonville was of advanced age and Devon was possibly unwell, as he died in Abingdon within eighteen months. His will was executed by some of the most important men on the Queen's council.

The region took no active part in the ensuing civil wars until the Battle of Tewkesbury in 1471, but both parties to the feud were killed in the civil wars over the next few years. The new Earl of Devon, who had killed Radford, was a thorough supporter of the Lancastrian regime. After the Yorkist victory at the Battle of Northampton in June 1460, he took his troops northwards to Margaret of Anjou in York, where, in April 1461, he was executed by the new king, Edward IV after the Battle of Towton. Bonville's son and grandson had been killed with the Duke of York and the Earl of Salisbury at the Battle of Wakefield in December 1460, and Bonville himself, captured after the Second Battle of St Albans was summarily beheaded – probably, so the chroniclers tell us, after a mock trial directly instigated by the Earl of Devon.

== Bibliography ==
- Attreed, L. (1992). "Arbitration and the Growth of Urban Liberties in Late Medieval England". Journal of British Studies. 31 (3): 205–235. doi:10.1086/386006. JSTOR 175990. S2CID 143659963.
- Cherry, M. (1979). "The Courtenay Earls of Devon: The Formation and Disintegration of a Late Medieval Aristocratic Affinity". Southern History. 1: 71–97.
- Cherry, M. (1981a). The Crown & Political Society in Devon (PhD). University of Wales (Swansea). OCLC 556420956.
- Cherry, M. (1981b). "The Struggle for Power in Mid-fifteenth-century Devonshire". In R.A. Griffiths (ed.). Patronage, the Crown and the Provinces in Later Medieval England. Gloucester: Sutton. pp. 123–144. ISBN 978-0-904387-45-2.
- Cokayne, G.E. & Gibbs, V.,(ed.), The Complete Peerage of Great Britain and Ireland, 16 vols, rev. (London, 1916).
- Goodman, A., The Wars of the Roses: Military Activity and English Society, 1452–97 (London, 1981)
- Griffiths, R.A. (1981). The Reign of King Henry VI. London: Ernest Benn. ISBN 978-0-510-26261-7.
- Hicks, M.A. (2010). The Wars of the Roses. New Haven: Yale University Press (published 26 October 2010). ISBN 978-0-300-11423-2.
- Kleineke, H. (2003). "Why the West was Wild: Law and Disorder in Fifteenth-Century Cornwall and Devon". In Linda S. Clark (ed.). The Fifteenth Century 3: Authority and Subversion. Woodbridge: Boydell Press. pp. 75–93. ISBN 978-1-84383-025-2.
- Kleineke, H. (2007). "'þe Kynges Cite': Exeter in the Wars of the Roses". In Linda Clark (ed.). The Fifteenth Century 7: Conflicts, Consequences and the Crown in the Late Middle Ages. Woodbridge: Boydell Press. pp. 137–156. ISBN 978-1-84383-333-8.
- Lander, J.R. (1960). "Henry VI and the Duke of York's Second Protectorate, 1455–6" (PDF). Bulletin of the John Rylands Library. 3: 46–69. doi:10.7227/BJRL.43.1.3. Archived from the original (PDF) on 4 June 2019.
- Radford, G.H. (1912). "The Fight at Clyst in 1455". Transactions of the Devonshire Association. 44: 252–265.
- Storey, R.L., The End of the House of Lancaster (Guildford, 1966).
