= Thomas Courtenay, 14th Earl of Devon =

Arms of Thomas de Courtenay, The Earl of Devon: Arms: Quarterly, 1st and 4th, azure label or three torteaux (for Courtenay); 2nd and 3rd, or a lion rampant azure (for Redvers)

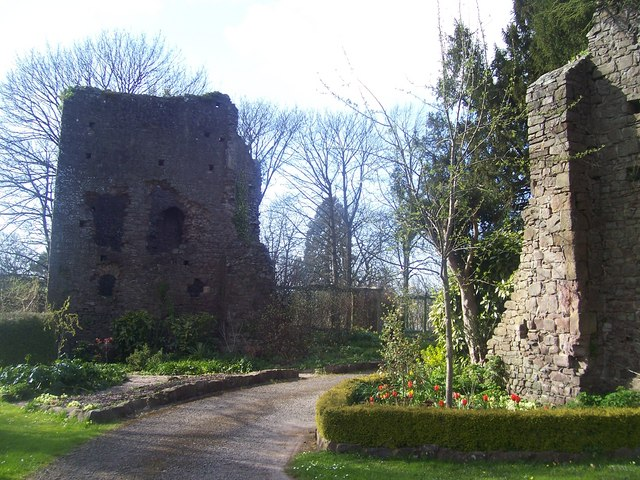
Ruins of Tiverton Castle, seat of the Earls of Devon

Thomas Courtenay, 6th/14th Earl of Devon (1432 – 3 April 1461), was the eldest son of Thomas de Courtenay, 5th/13th Earl of Devon, by his wife Margaret Beaufort, the daughter of John Beaufort, 1st Earl of Somerset, and Margaret Holland, daughter of Thomas Holland, 2nd Earl of Kent. Through his mother, he was a great-great-grandson of King Edward III. The ordinal number given to the early Courtenay Earls of Devon depends on whether the earldom is deemed a new creation by the letters patent granted 22 February 1334/5 or whether it is deemed a restitution of the old dignity of the de Redvers family. Authorities differ in their opinions, and thus alternative ordinal numbers exist, given here.

== Family ==
Courtenay was born in 1432, the eldest son and heir of Thomas Courtenay, 13th Earl of Devon, by Margaret Beaufort. He had two brothers and five sisters:

- Henry Courtenay (d. 17 January 1469), esquire, of West Coker, Somerset, de jure 7th Earl of Devon, beheaded for treason in the market place at Salisbury, Wiltshire on 17 January 1469.
- Sir John Courtenay, (1435– 3 May 1471), slain at the Battle of Tewkesbury on 4 May 1471.
- Joan Courtenay (born c. 1447), who married firstly, Sir Roger Clifford, second son of Thomas Clifford, 8th Baron de Clifford, beheaded after Bosworth in 1485. She married secondly, Sir William Knyvet of Buckenham, Norfolk.
- Elizabeth Courtenay (born c. 1449), who married, before March 1490, Sir Hugh Conway.
- Anne Courtenay
- Eleanor Courtenay
- Maud Courtenay.

== Career ==
Thomas Courtenay was 26 years old when his father died on 3 February 1458. The Courtenay family were among the greatest magnates of the south-west, especially in Devon, where they had their greatest concentration of estates and dominated a tightly-knit affinity among the local gentry. In the mid-fifteenth century their local supremacy had been challenged by William, Lord Bonville, leading to a violent feud which culminated in Bonville's defeat by Thomas's father at Clyst Heath in 1455. That Earl, frequently in trouble with the law for his violent behaviour, had been among the closest allies of the disaffected Richard of York in the early 1450s, but a wedge was driven between York and the Courtenays when Bonville became a client of the leading Yorkist magnate Richard Neville, Earl of Warwick.

When the first major phase of the Wars of the Roses broke out in 1459, Earl Thomas remained loyal to Henry VI. After the Yorkists seized power and captured King Henry in 1460, he joined other south-western aristocrats including Henry Beaufort, Duke of Somerset in raising a Lancastrian army, which went to join the forces being gathered by the queen, Margaret of Anjou, in northern England. The Bonville family, fighting on the Yorkist side, were wiped out during the ensuing fighting, but the Lancastrians were decisively defeated in the Battle of Towton on 29 March 1461. Courtenay was captured in the battle, and was beheaded at York on 3 April. He was attainted by Parliament in November of that year, depriving his heirs of the earldom of Devon, the barony of Courtenay and his estates. Courtenay's younger brother, Henry, had been granted several manors by King Edward IV on 27 July 1461, including Topsham, and these manors were also forfeited by his elder brother's attainder. Henry himself was beheaded at Salisbury on 17 January 1469.

== Marriage ==
Courtenay married, at Coventry, Warwickshire, shortly after 9 September 1456, Mary of Anjou, illegitimate daughter of Charles, Count of Maine. There were no issue of the marriage. She is thought to have been the 'Countess of Devonshire' who was captured with Margaret of Anjou after the Battle of Tewkesbury on 4 May 1471.

== Footnotes ==
Peerage of England
Preceded by Thomas Courtenay	Earl of Devon; 1458–1461	Succeeded by John Courtenay
