= Margaret, Countess of Devon =

Margaret, Countess of Devon may refer to:

- Margaret de Bohun, 2nd Countess of Devon (1311 — 1391)
- Margaret Beaufort, Countess of Devon (1409 — 1449)
