= Margaret Beaufort (disambiguation) =

Margaret Beaufort (1443–1509), Countess of Richmond and Derby, was a leading figure in the Wars of the Roses and the mother of King Henry VII of England.

Other people called Margaret Beaufort include:

- Margaret Beaufort, Countess of Devon (c. 1409–1449), daughter of John Beaufort, 1st Earl of Somerset; mother of Thomas Courtenay, 14th Earl of Devon, and John Courtenay, 15th Earl of Devon
- Margaret Beaufort, Countess of Stafford (c. 1437–1474), daughter of Edmund Beaufort, 2nd Duke of Somerset; mother of Henry Stafford, 2nd Duke of Buckingham

== See also ==
- Margaret Beauchamp of Bletso (1410–1482), wife of John Beaufort, 1st Duke of Somerset; mother of Margaret Beaufort, Countess of Richmond and Derby
- Margaret Holland, Duchess of Clarence (1385–1439), wife of John Beaufort, 1st Earl of Somerset; mother of Margaret Beaufort, Countess of Devon
