= Colcombe Castle =

Former castle in Devon, England

Coordinates: 50.7477°N 3.0666°W

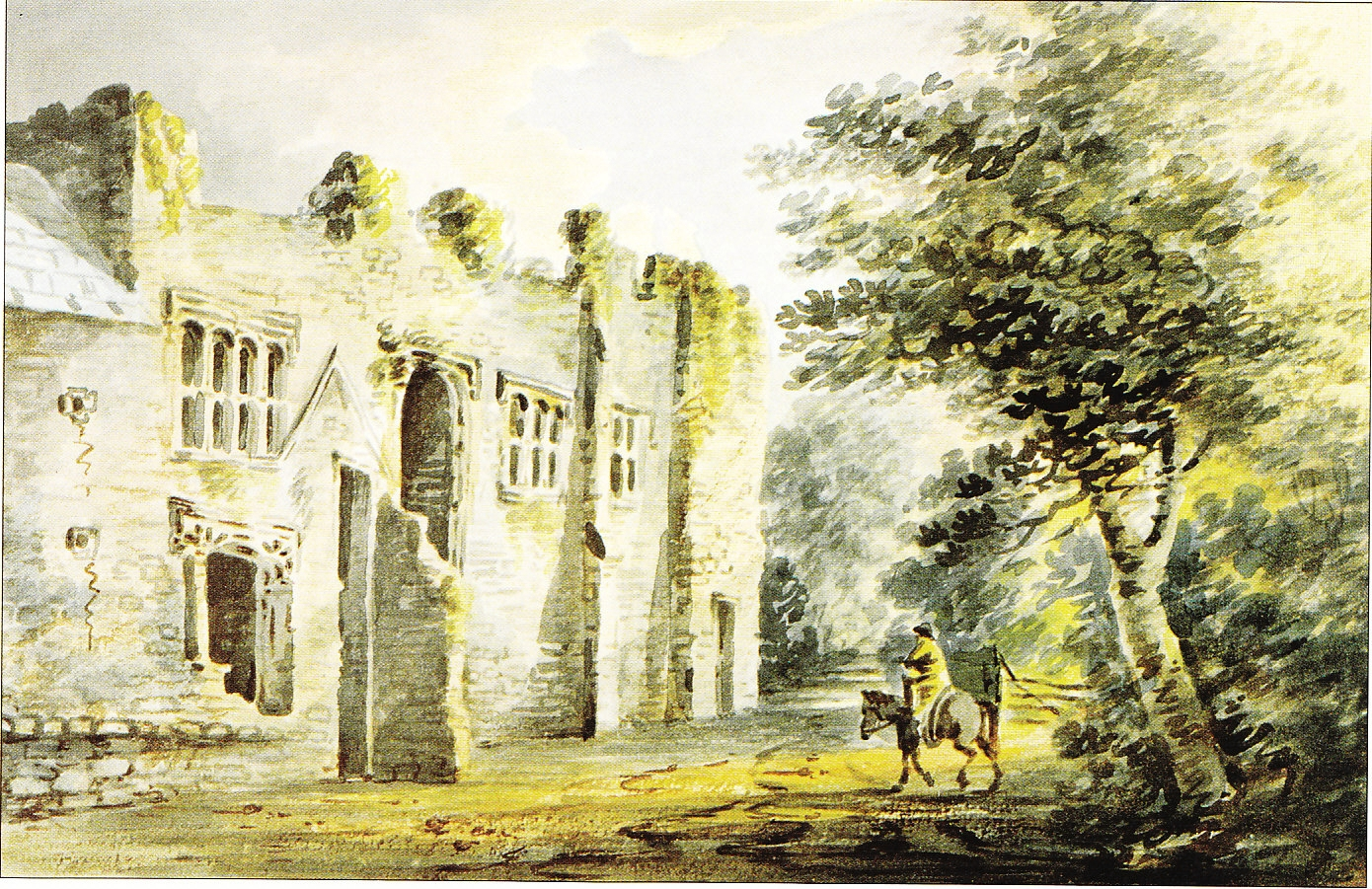
"Colecombe Castle", watercolour by Rev. John Swete dated 27 January 1795. Swete wrote: "Standing by the door of (the farmhouse) I took the...sketch which will give some notion of the front and which seems to have been the principal one with an aspect to the west...(with) Colyton to the left". Devon Record Office 564M/F7/77

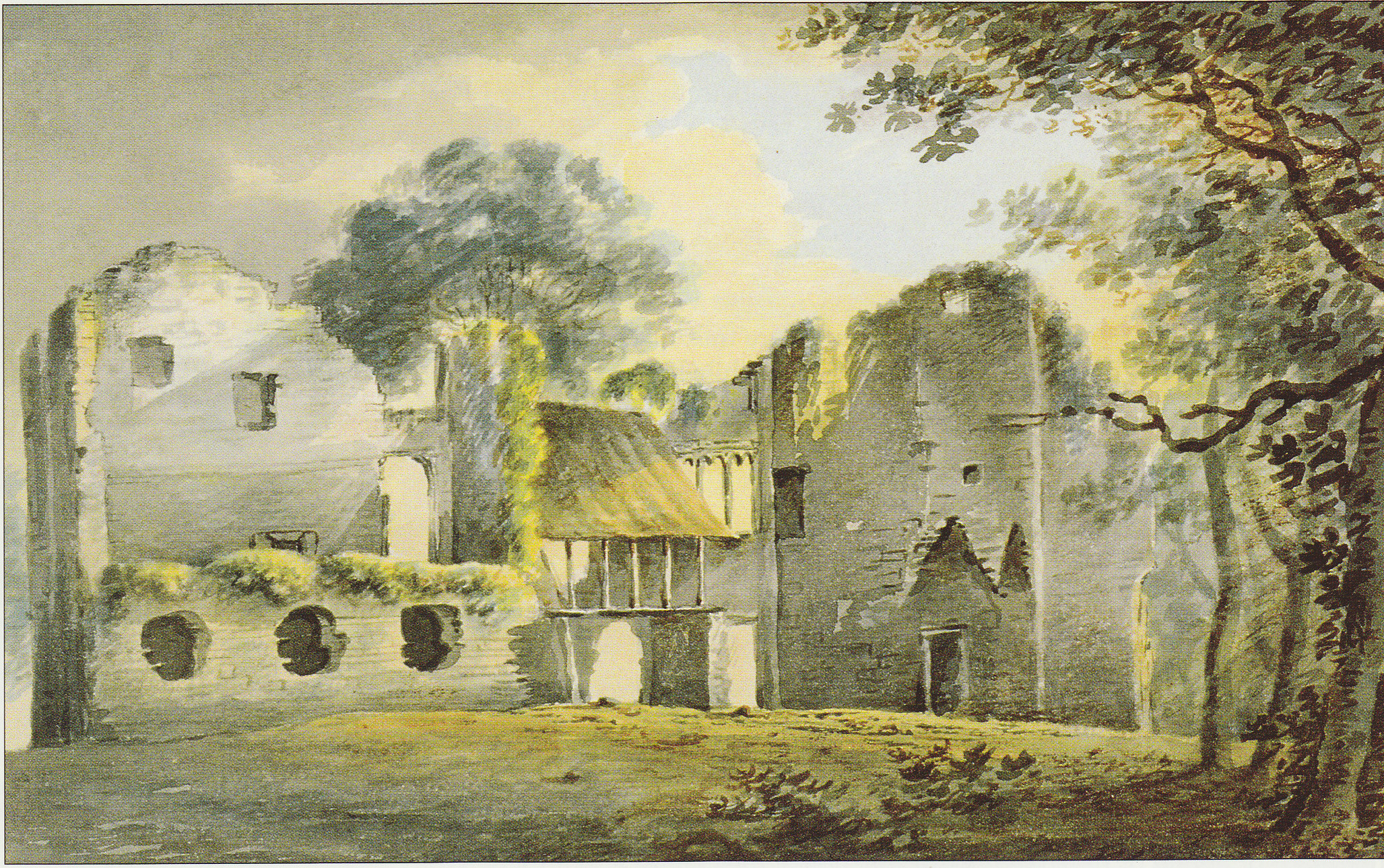
"Inside of Colecombe Castle", watercolour by Rev. John Swete dated 26 January 1795. Devon Record Office 564M/F7/73

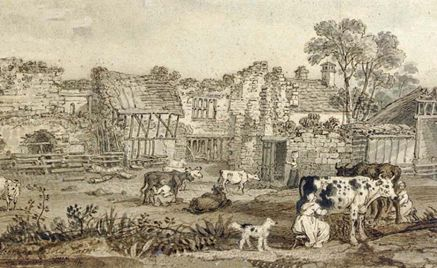
Drawing of remains of Colcombe Castle, by James Ward (1769-1859), apparently from the same viewpoint as the Swete watercolour of 26/1/1795

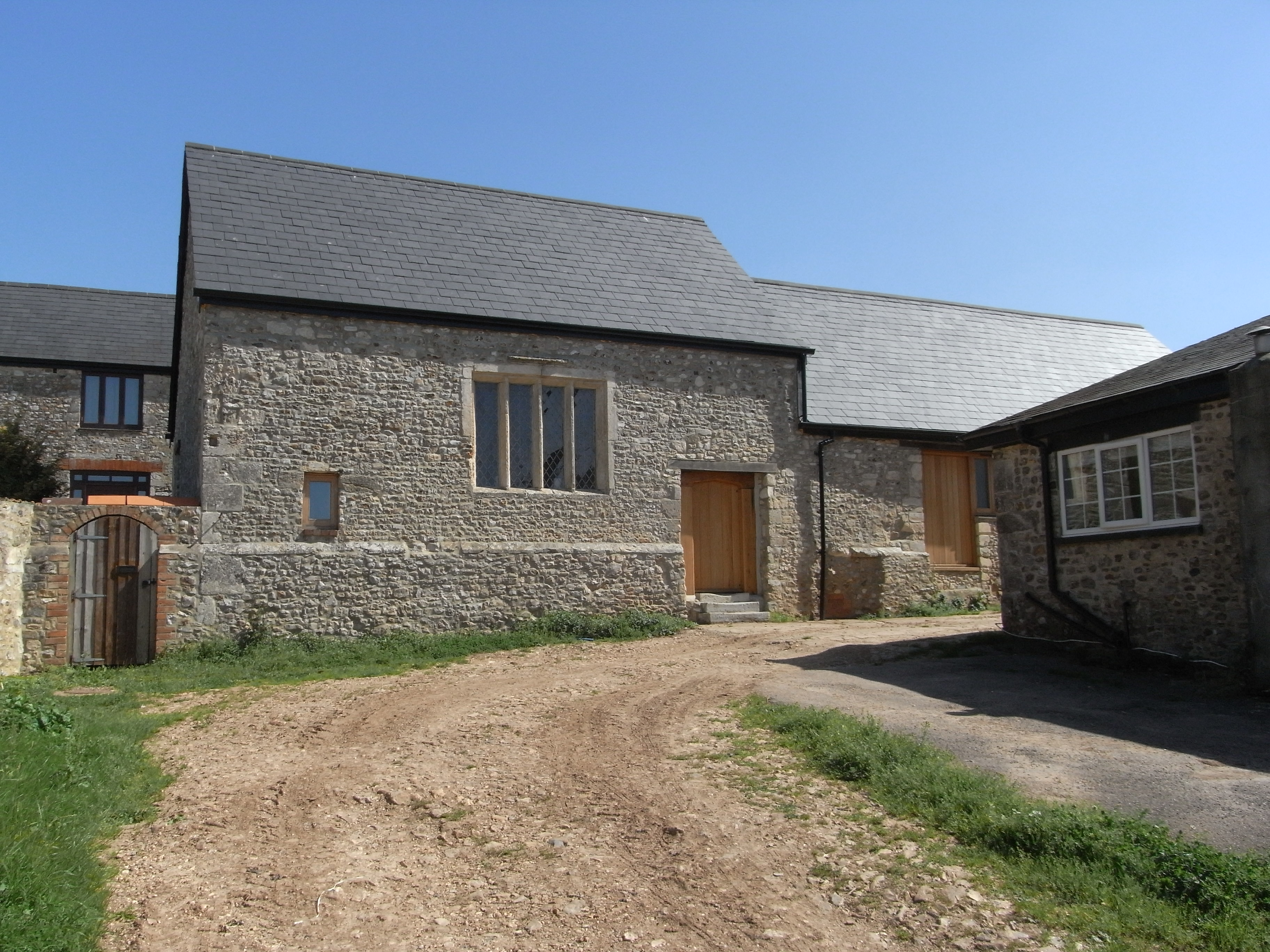
Surviving ancient building formerly part of Colcombe Castle, situated today in the yard of Colcombe Abbey Farm, facing main farmhouse

Colcombe Castle was a castle or fortified house situated about a 0.5 mi (0.80 km) north of the town of Colyton in East Devon, England.

It was a seat of the Courtenay family, Earls of Devon, whose principal seat was Tiverton Castle, about 22 miles (35 km) to the north west. It was used as his seat by Thomas de Courtenay, 5th Earl of Devon (d. 1458) while his widowed mother occupied Tiverton Castle as her dower house. Its position near to Shute, the seat of William Bonville, 1st Baron Bonville (1392–1461), the arch-enemy of the 5th Earl, led to some serious territorial battles between the two families, culminating in the Battle of Clyst Heath of 1455.

== History ==
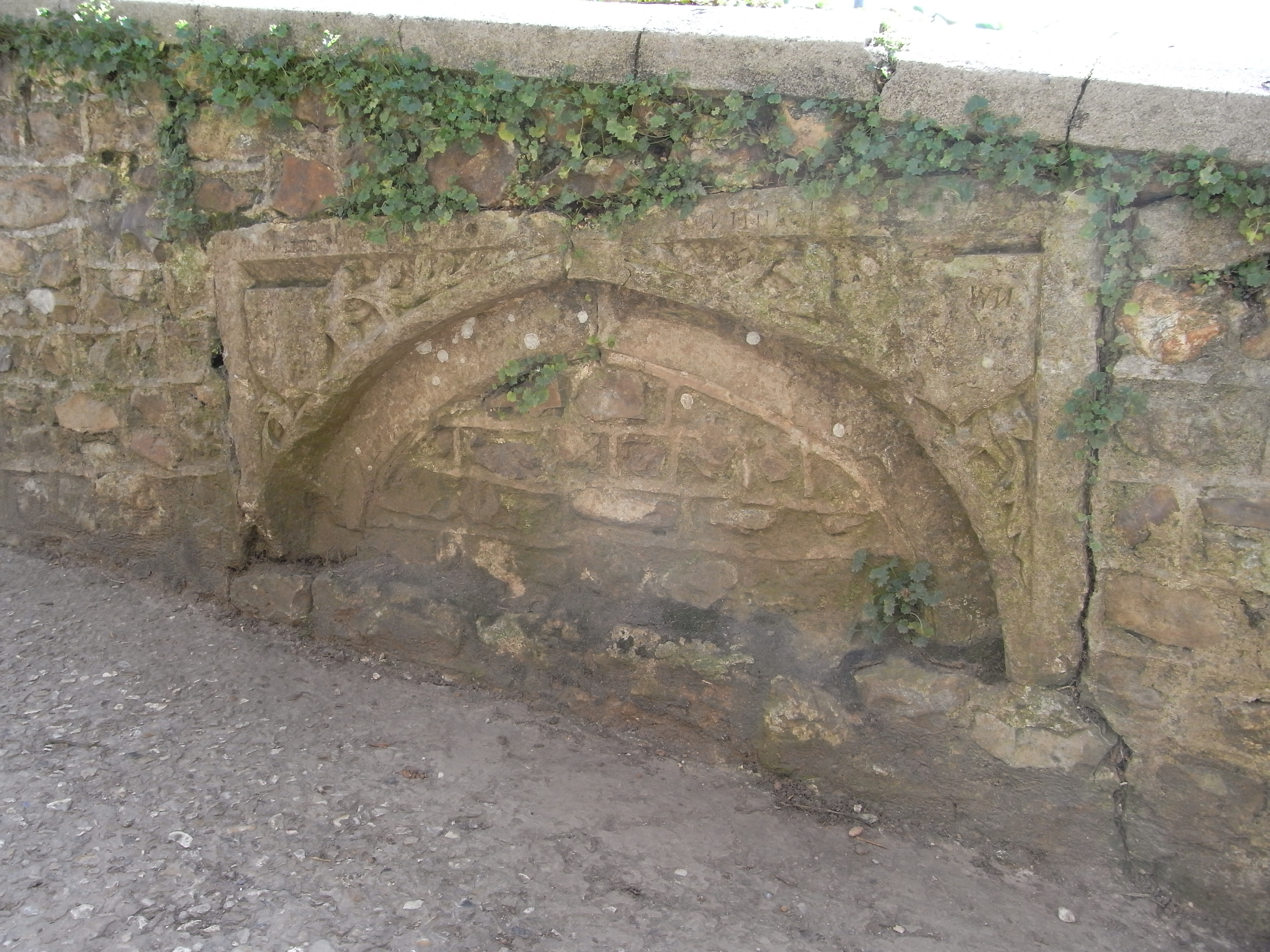
High quality sculpted stone Tudor-arch from window with heraldic shields at each side, heraldry worn away, formerly part of Colcombe Castle, Colyton, Devon, now set into low parapet of footbridge over leat of Colcombe Abbey Farm, opposite front door of farmhouse

Tristram Risdon, writing c. 1630, described the descent of the manor of Colyton thus:

The manor at the Norman Conquest was parcel of the king's demesne, which King William the Conqueror gave to Robert de Mount Chardon; but was released again by King Henry II of England, with the manor of Whitford, which was bestowed on Sir Alan Dunstanville, whose son Sir Walter Dunstanville gave it in marriage (by the consent of King John) unto Sir Thomas Bassett, his nephew, younger son of the Lord Bassett by Alice Dunstanville, sister of the said Walter. This land descended unto the two daughters of the said Sir Thomas Bassett: Joan Bassett, first married Sir Reginald Valletort, secondly married Sir William Courtenay, younger son of the Lord Courtenay. Alice Bassett, the other daughter, was married to Sir Thomas Sanford, and secondly to Sir John Bissett, whose part was afterwards sold unto Hugh de Courtenay, 1st Earl of Devon, so that the whole manors of Colyton and Whitford came to be the possessions of the Earls of Devon. The Earl built a mansion house at Colcombe, near Colyton, which was later rebuilt in a more grand state by Henry Courtenay, but upon his death, the mansion was left in ruins for a time. It was later restored unto his son, Edward Courtenay, the last earl of this family, by Queen Mary I of England, and upon his death, was left to descend to the heirs general, who sold this manor and house. Now the manor was divided; the one moiety the lord Petre possesseth, the other moiety, Sir John Pole and Sir John Drake, knights, acquired.

Hoskins states that it was first built during the reign of King Edward I of England (1272–1307) by Hugh de Courtenay (1276–1340), and was rebuilt ("on a magnificent scale", according to Hoskins) by Henry Courtenay, 1st Marquess of Exeter, 2nd Earl of Devon (1498–1539), after whose attainder and execution, it became forfeit to the crown. It was restored with other lands to his son, Edward Courtenay, 1st Earl of Devon (1527–1556), after whose death it passed, together with Tiverton Castle, to his heirs, the descendants of his four great-aunts, and eventually fell into a ruinous state.

Part of the Colcombe estate was purchased by William Pole Esquire (d. 1588), who had purchased Shute House in 1560. His son Sir William Pole (1561–1635), the antiquary, purchased the remaining shares from the heirs of the Courtenays, and rebuilt the house, as he recorded after 1618 in his "Collections towards a History of Devon":

A goodly building was here intended by the last erles but altogether unfinished, and nowe the whole being reduced from all ye co-heires unto my possession, I have newe built the howse and made it the place of my residinge".

Sir William resided most of his younger life at Shute, until 1618, during which time he let his son John, later the 1st Pole baronet, live in the former building at Colcombe, as is evidenced by the record of the birth of John's second son Courtenay Pole, which described his father as "John Pole of Colcombe". In 1618 Sir William Pole exchanged residences with his son John, to whom he let Shute, and himself moved to Colcombe, which he then set about rebuilding and where he died in 1635. During the Civil War it served in 1644 as the headquarters of Prince Maurice (d. 1652), who used it as a base for his attack on Stedcombe, then being used as a garrison for parliamentary troops by its owner Sir Walter Erle. It was almost completely destroyed, with only part of the kitchen and a large fireplace having survived. During the conflagration, many of the volumes of the manuscripts of the antiquary's great work on the history of Devon, with substantial additions made by his son the 1st baronet, were destroyed. After the Civil War part was rebuilt on the other side of a lane as a farmhouse. Colcombe appears to have passed out of the Pole family after the time of the 1st baronet, but was repurchased by Sir John de la Pole, 6th Baronet (1757–1799), the builder of New Shute House, possibly from Sir George Yonge of Colyton, from whom he had acquired several large properties in 1790. The 6th baronet seems to have decided to re-build it in the grand style of its former existence when owned by Henry Courtenay, 1st Marquess of Exeter, 2nd Earl of Devon (1498–1539). However he died before his plan could be effected and stipulated in his will that his heirs should build "a good substantial dwelling-house with suitable offices and at least five acres of land in Colcombe Park where his widow should live". It is unlikely the request was ever acted upon. His widow is known to have spent her last days at Lindridge House near Plymouth tending her sick brother.

== Description ==
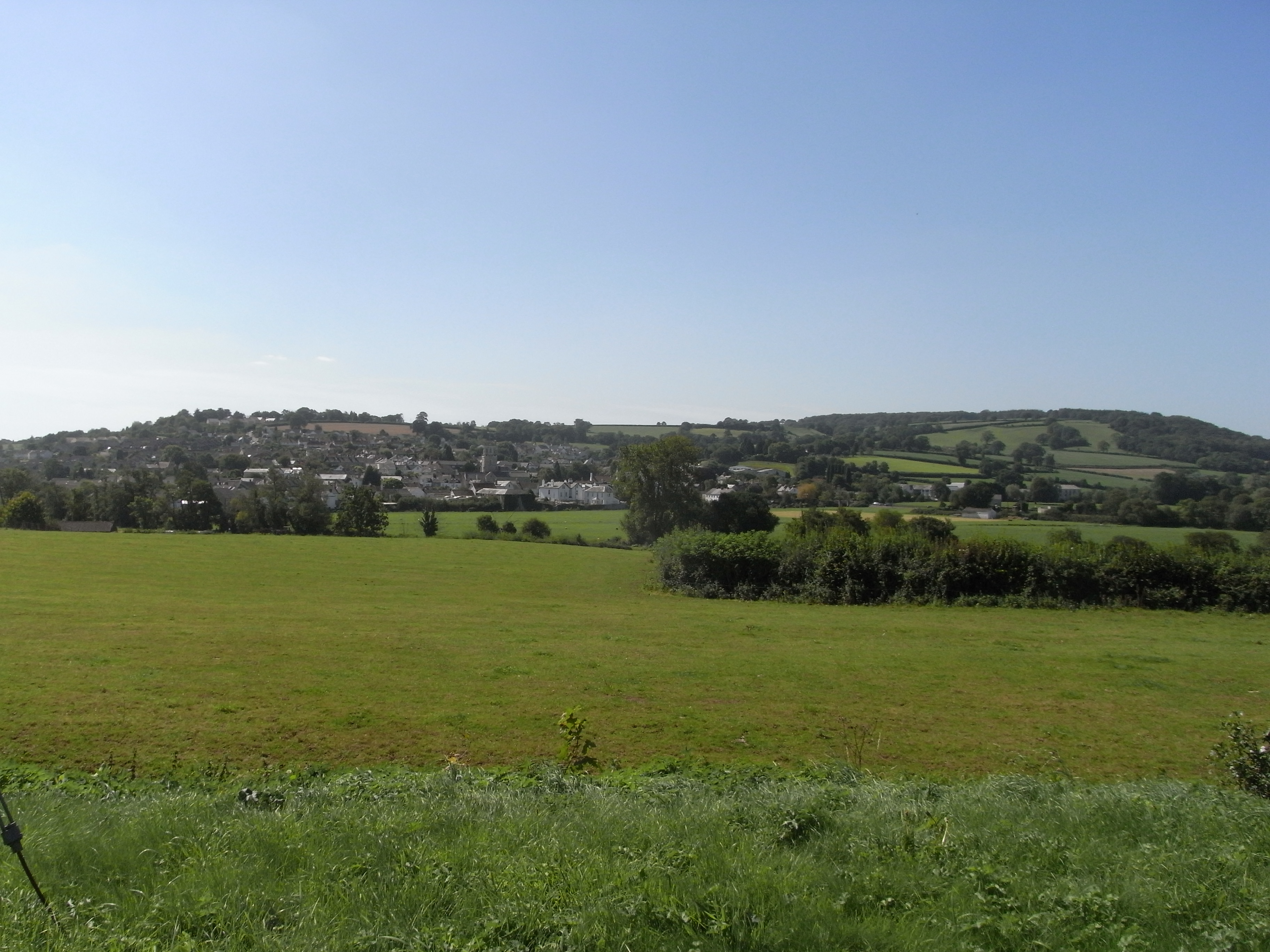
View from site of Colcombe Castle southward towards Colyton town

Pevsner doubts the building having been a true castle or indeed having been fortified at all. Few remains survive on the site now occupied by a farmhouse and farmbuildings called "Colcombe Abbey Farm". (The appellation "Abbey" appears to have no historical significance as no Abbey is known to have occupied the site.) Only one small building, now converted to a house with Grade II listing, displays signs of ancient construction, namely its mullioned stone window. Hoskins reported this to contain "a splendid kitchen with a fireplace nearly 20 feet across with a private room above". A wide and shallow leat runs under the present farmhouse, suggesting either a former moat, as tentatively proposed by Pevsner, or perhaps a mill. The top Tudor-shaped arch of an ancient stone window frame with heraldic escutcheons on either side, from which the armorials have been worn away, survives set into a low parapet wall on a bridge spanning the leat, in front of the front door of the farmhouse. The site is a terrace with a panoramic view of the town of Colyton, situated on a low hill on the opposite side of a shallow valley. The Devon historial Polwhele stated it to have been ruinous in his own time. The topographer Rev. John Swete visited Colcombe on 26 and 27 January 1795 and painted two watercolours and made a description in his journal as follows:

Having dined here (i.e. Colyton) about five I quitted it for Colcombe Castle, which lay about half a mile from the town. Having by a bridge crost the River Coly, I turned to the left and quickly came to the ruins of this once capital mansion. Perhaps little if any of the edifice wherein once the Courtenay Earls of Devon resided is now to be seen...Of this house of Colcombe, which Sir William (Pole) called a Castle are the present ruins. The whole of the area seen in the preceding sketch (i.e. dated 26 January 1795) and consisting of the interior part of the building are nearly the same as the print given in the "History of Devon" (i.e. by Polwhele). What was once the Forum at Rome is now become a cow-market, and the castle of the Earls of Devon and of the antiquary Sir Wm Pole is now converted into a farmer's dung-court, such is the transition from splendour to meaness. And from the pride and honour of strength to the lowest degradation and decay! On the western side, separated by a lane, is the house in which the farmer dwells who rents the estate of Colcombe of Sir J. de la Pole and which was probably built from the ruins of the castle. Standing by the door of it I took the preceding sketch (i.e. dated 27 January 1795) which will give some notion of the front and which seems to have been the principal one with an aspect to the west commanding the beautiful scenery of the expanse of pasture beneath through which ran the River Coly, of the hilly woodlands in Shute Park to the right and the beautiful object of Colyton to the left the situation had been happily chosen. It had in view many picturesqu beauties and placed sub aprico colle (Ovid, Elegy V; i.e. "under a sunny hill") was well calculated for a family residence".

== Courtenay monument, Colyton Church ==
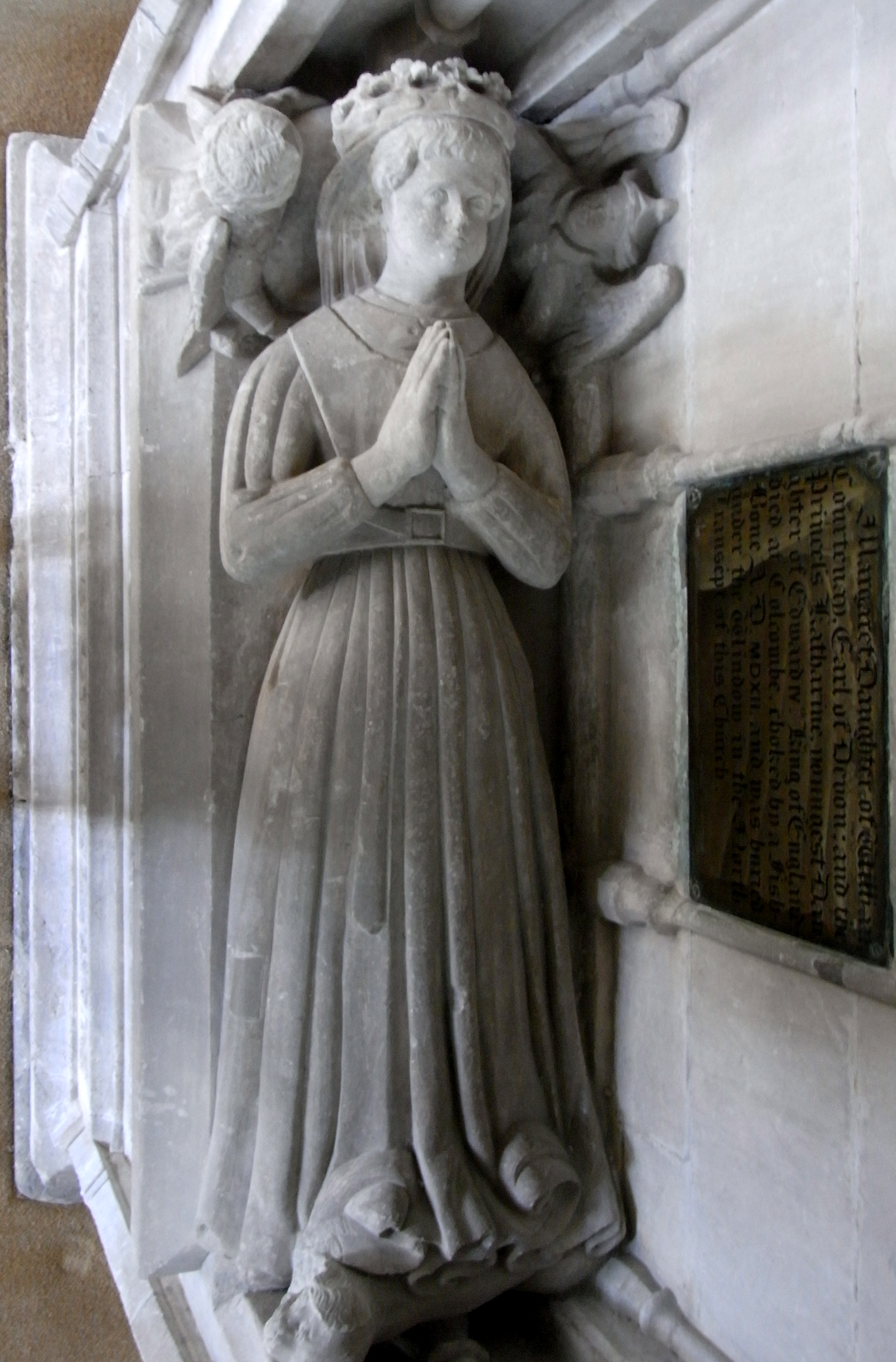
Effigy said by erroneous tradition to represent Margaret I Courtenay (d. 1512), "little choke-a-bone", daughter of William Courtenay, who died as an infant, having choked on a fish-bone at Colcombe Castle. Colyton Church, Devon

Little physical evidence survives of the Courtenay family's residence at Colcombe Castle, except a monument with female effigy in the parish church of St Andrew, Colyton. The effigy is identified by tradition as "little choke-a-bone", Margaret Courtenay (d. 1512), an infant daughter of William Courtenay, 1st Earl of Devon (1475–1511) by his wife Princess Catherine of York (d. 1527), the sixth daughter of King Edward IV (1461–1483). The effigy is only about 3 ft in length, much smaller than usual for an adult. The face and head was renewed in 1907, and is said to have been based on the sculptor's own infant daughter. A 19th-century brass tablet above is inscribed: "Margaret, daughter of William Courtenay Earl of Devon and the Princess Katharine youngest daughter of Edward IVth King of England, died at Colcombe choked by a fish-bone AD MDXII and was buried under the window in the north transept of this church".

=== Heraldry ===
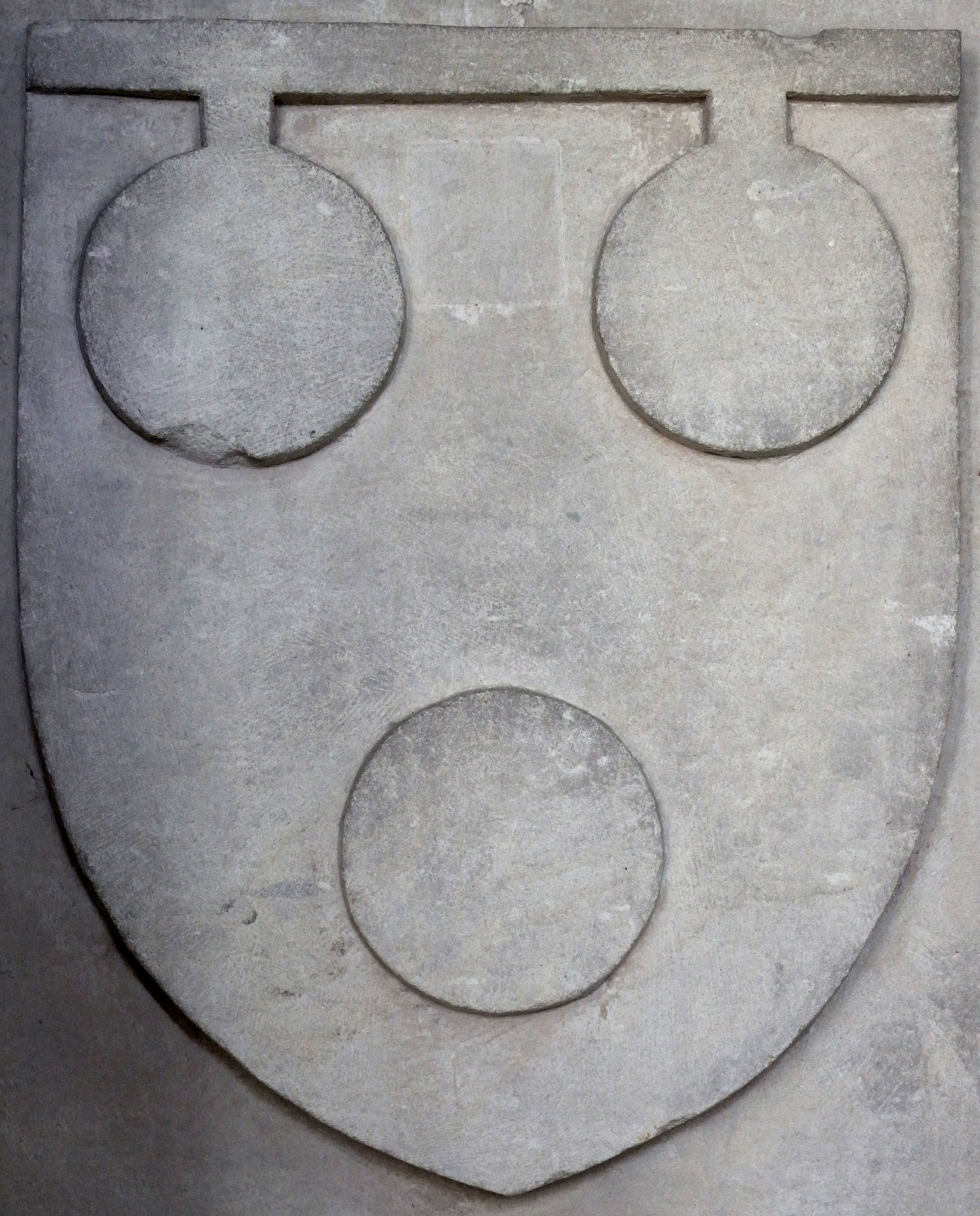
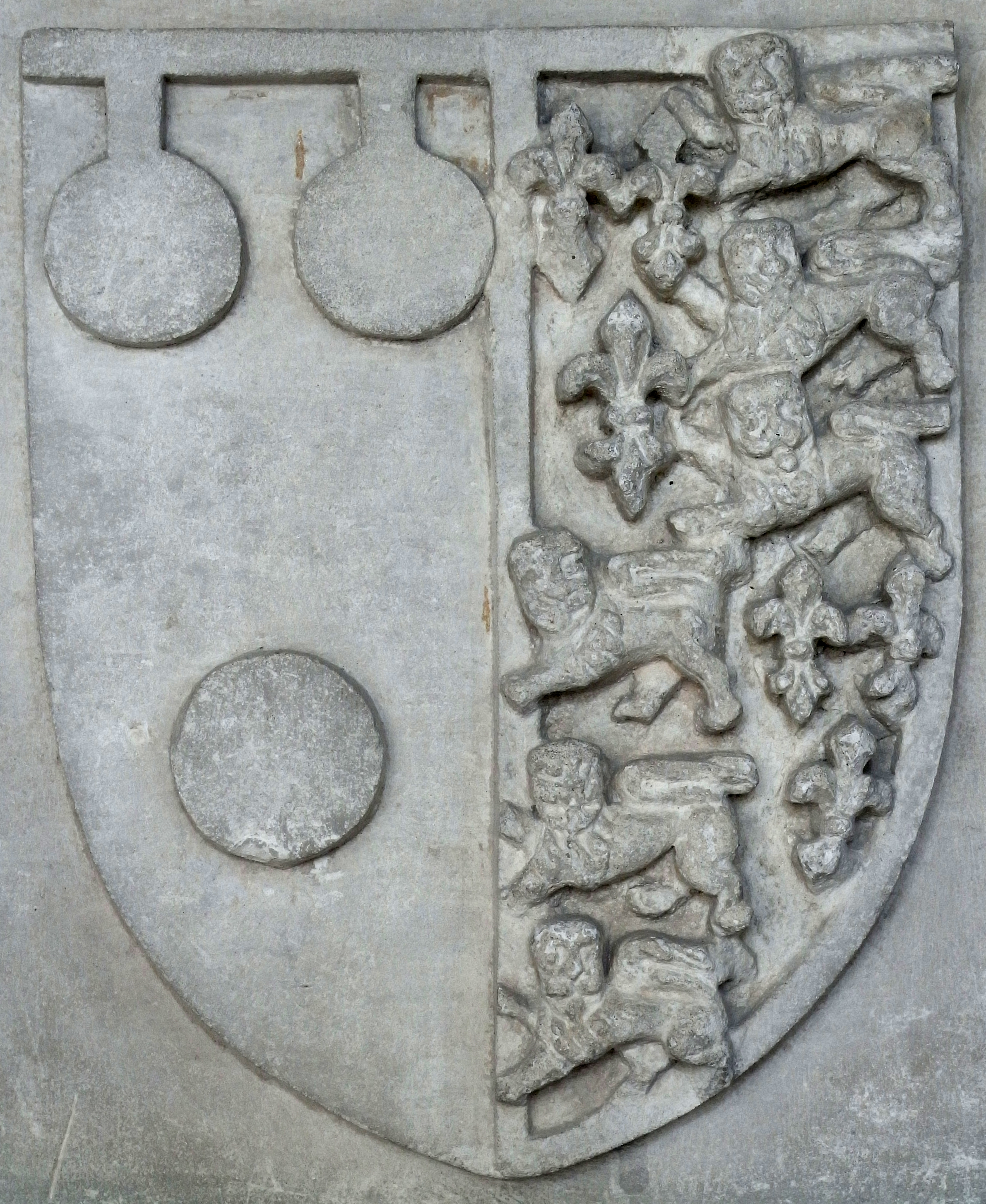
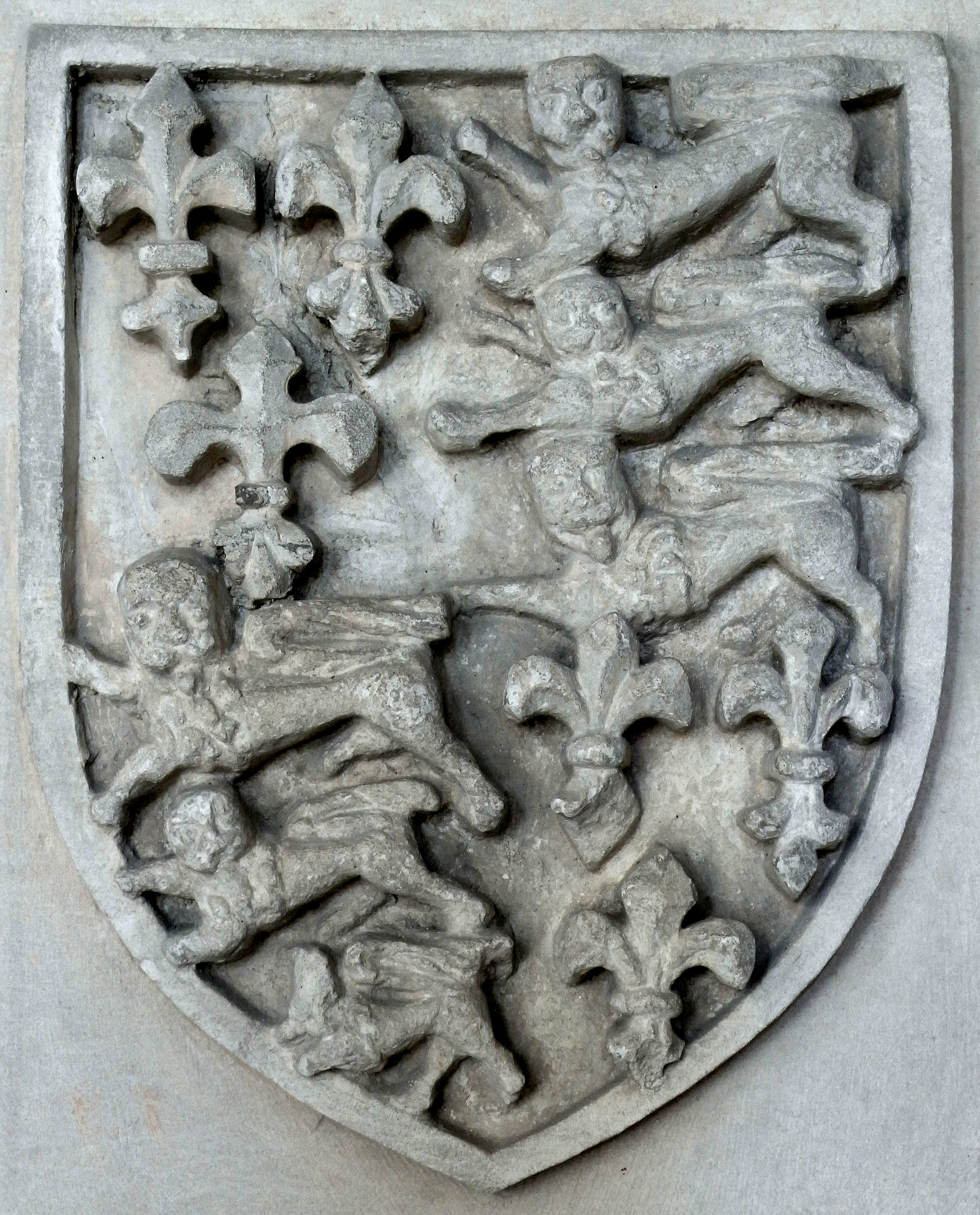
Arrangement of heraldic escutcheons above female effigy in Colyton Church. left arms of Courtenay (without border); centre: arms of Courtenay (without border) impaling royal arms of England (with border); right: royal arms of England (with border). The interpretation of the existence or otherwise of a heraldic bordure is significant to the correct identification of the effigy

Arms of Beaufort family, Earls and Dukes of Somerset: The Royal Arms of England (Quarterly, 1st & 4th: Azure, three fleurs de lis or (France); 2nd & 3rd: Gules, three lions passant guardant in pale or (England)) all within a bordure compony argent and azure for difference

Three sculpted heraldic shields of arms exist above the effigy, showing the arms of Courtenay, Courtenay impaling the royal arms of England and the royal arms of England. Later authorities have suggested, on the basis of the monument's heraldry, the effigy to be the wife of Thomas Courtenay, 5th/13th Earl of Devon (1414–1458), namely Lady Margaret Beaufort (c. 1409–1449), daughter of John Beaufort, 1st Marquess of Somerset, 1st Marquess of Dorset (1373–1410), KG, (later only 1st Earl of Somerset), (the first of the four illegitimate children of John of Gaunt, 1st Duke of Lancaster (4th son of King Edward III), and his mistress Katherine Swynford, later his wife) by his wife Margaret Holland. The basis of this re-attribution is the supposed fact that the "royal arms" shown are not the arms of King Edward IV, but rather the arms of Beaufort. The arms of Beaufort are the royal arms of England differenced within a bordure compony argent and azure.

== Chantry Chapel ==
A Chantry Chapel dedicated to St. John was founded at Colcombe by Hugh de Courtenay, 2nd/10th Earl of Devon (1303–1377) in 1348. He endowed it with various lands, including within the parish of Colyton, later memorialised by the names Chantry Bridge and Chantry Meadow, the latter in 1888 "a favourite resort and playground for the town's children". Following the downfall of the Courtenays and the Dissolution of the Monasteries the Chantry and its lands were purchased from the Crown by Walter Erle (died 1581), a royal courtier who in 1546 had been granted by Queen Catherine Parr a 40-year lease of Colcombe, having already in 1543 been granted the office of "Bailiff and Hayward of the manor and hundred of Colyton and Keeper of the park and mansion of Colcombe".

== Sources ==
- Listed Buildings text, Colcombe Castle
- Pevsner, N., & Cherry, B., Buildings of England: Devon, London, 2004, pp. 273–74
- Hoskins, W.G., A New Survey of England: Devon, London, 1959, p. 374
- Bridie, Marion F., The Story of Shute, Axminster, 1955
