= Thomas de Courtenay, 5th/13th Earl of Devon =

English nobleman of the Wars of the Roses

Thomas Courtenay
- 5th or 13th Earl of Devon
- Arms of the Courtenay earls of Devon: Or, three torteaux a label azure
- Tenure: 16 June 1422 – 3 February 1458
- Other titles: 6th Lord Courtenay; Baron of Okehampton
- Born: 3 May 1414; Devon, England
- Died: 3 February 1458 (aged 43); Abingdon Abbey, Oxfordshire, England
- Residence: Okehampton Castle; Tiverton Castle; Colcombe Castle
- Locality: Devon, Cornwall
- Net worth: £1,516 (1422)
- Wars and battles: Hundred Years' War; Bonville–Courtenay feud • Battle of Clyst Heath; Wars of the Roses • 1st Battle of St Albans (WIA)
- Offices: Steward of the duchy of Cornwall
- Spouses: Margaret Beaufort
- Issue more...: Thomas, Earl of Devon; John, Earl of Devon
- House: Courtenay
- Father: Hugh de Courtenay, 12th Earl of Devon
- Mother: Anne Talbot

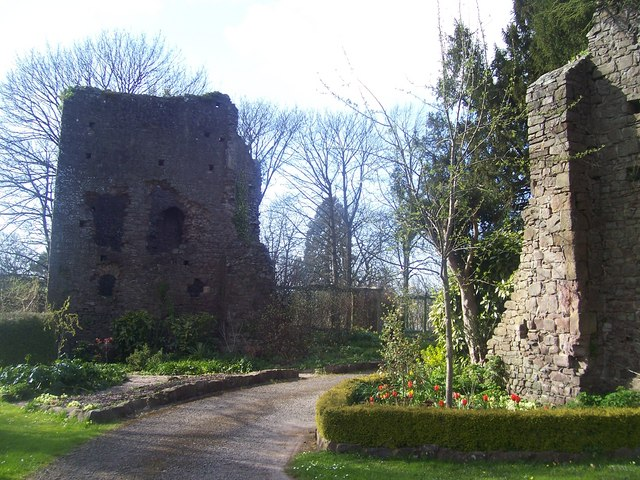
Ruins of Tiverton Castle, seat of the Earls of Devon

Thomas de Courtenay, 5th/13th Earl of Devon (3 May 1414 – 3 February 1458) was a nobleman from South West England. His seat was at Colcombe Castle near Colyton, and later at the principal historic family seat of Tiverton Castle, after his mother's death. The Courtenay family had historically been an important one in the region, and the dominant force in the counties of Devon and Cornwall. However, the rise in power and influence of several gentry families and other political players, in the years leading up to Thomas' accession to the earldom, threatened the traditional dominance of the earls of Devon in the area. Much of his life was spent in armed territorial struggle against his near-neighbour, Sir William Bonville of Shute, at a time when central control over the provinces was weak. This feud forms part of the breakdown in law and order in England that led to the Wars of the Roses.

Courtenay was for a time engaged in overseas service during the Hundred Years' War. Increasingly, however, his efforts became directed towards strengthening his position at home. He had been married off as an infant to Margaret Beaufort, placing Courtenay close to the English king's Beaufort kinsmen. Due to this connection, Courtenay started his career as an adherent to the English court's Beaufort party. Upon their demise in the late 1440s, he abandoned it in favour of Richard Plantagenet, 3rd Duke of York. When York sought the support of Courtenay's arch-enemy Bonville, Courtenay fell out of favour with him. When the Wars of the Roses broke out, he was in the party of the queen, Margaret of Anjou, and was one of the Lancastrian commanders at the First Battle of St Albans, where he was wounded.

Courtenay was said to have promoted a reconciliation between the Lancastrian and Yorkist parties, but he died suddenly in 1458. The Wars of the Roses later led to the deaths and executions of all three of Courtenay's sons, Thomas, Henry and John, and to the eventual attainder of his titles and forfeiture of his lands. The earldom was, however, revived in 1485 for his distant cousin, Sir Edward Courtenay, third in descent from his great-uncle.

== Youth ==
Courtenay was born on 3 May 1414, the only surviving son of Hugh Courtenay, 4th/12th Earl of Devon (1389 – 16 June 1422) and Anne Talbot (c. 1393 – 1441), sister of the renowned warrior John Talbot, 1st Earl of Shrewsbury. He succeeded as Earl of Devon in 1422, at the age of eight. He may at some time before have become a ward of the all-powerful Thomas Beaufort, Duke of Exeter.

According to Cokayne, Courtenay was knighted on 19 May 1426 by King Henry VI of England, and on 16 December 1431, Courtenay was among an entourage of 300 who attended King Henry VI's second coronation at Notre Dame in Paris.

=== Majority ===
It appears that no inquisition of proof of age, customary for a tenant in chief, was taken for his father. Based on his family's history and standing and on his own position as the leading landowner of the county, probably expected to take his place as the leader of Devon society. However, his mother's longevity meant that her dower portion, including Tiverton Castle, and the other Courtenay estates which had been alienated under his father's will were not in his hands and the young Courtenay was forced to live at Colcombe Castle, near Colyton, very close to his enemy William Bonville, 1st Baron Bonville, at Shute. His income of £1,500 p.a. was lower than that of most nobles of comparable rank.

== Career ==
=== Struggle with Bonville ===
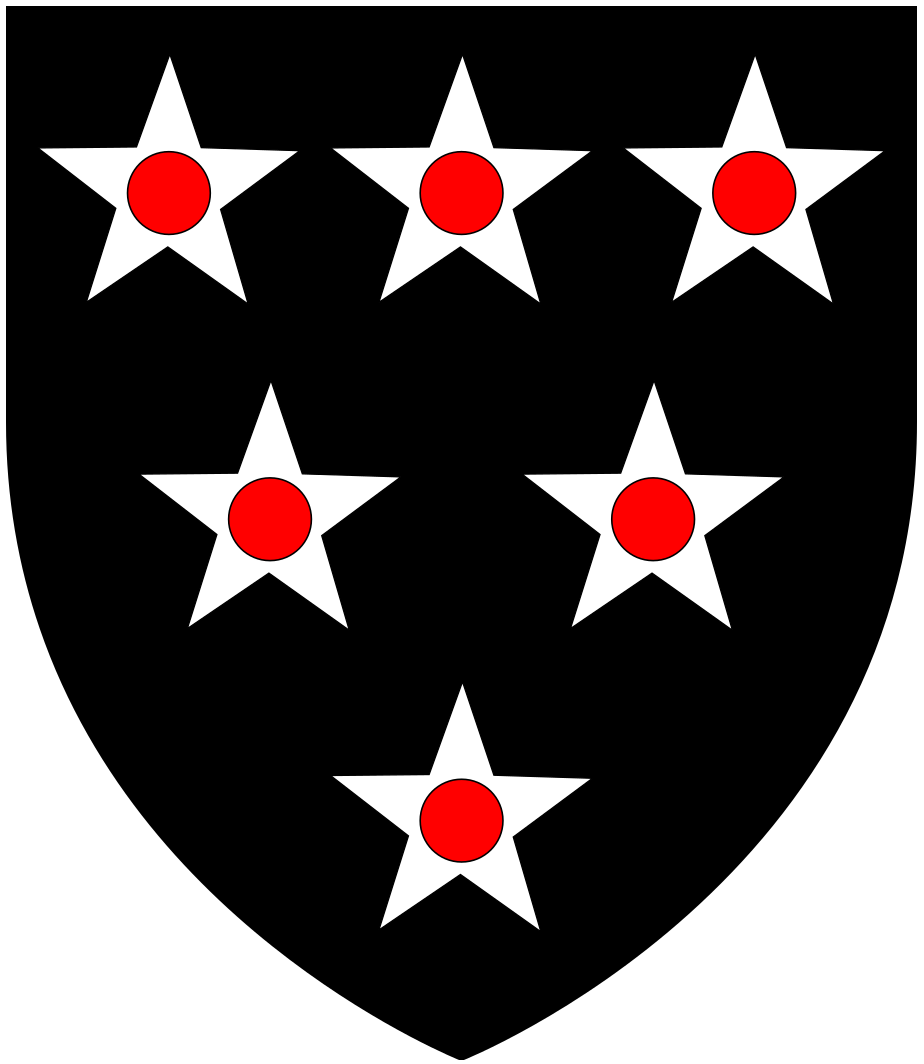
Arms of Bonville: Sable, six mullets argent pierced gules

The new earl found the political situation in Devonshire increasingly stacked against his own interests as a coalition of the greater gentry, led by William Bonville, 1st Baron Bonville, and the earl's cousin, Sir Philip Courtenay of Powderham, threatened the Courtenays' traditional dominance of the county. The relationship was complicated by Bonville's second marriage in 1430 to Elizabeth Courtenay (d. 1471), Courtenay's aunt. Despite links via his wife, Margaret Beaufort, to the ascendant "court party" led by Cardinal Beaufort and John Beaufort, 1st earl of Somerset and Marquess of Dorset, and by Margaret Holland, daughter of the Earl of Kent, Courtenay failed to rectify his situation and instead resorted to violence, beginning in 1439. With the decline of Beaufort power, Courtenay became increasingly associated with Richard Plantagenet, 3rd Duke of York. Courtenay had been attacking Bonville's estates in the summer of 1439 and the king despatched a Privy Councillor, Sir John Stourton, 1st Baron Stourton, to extract a promise of good behaviour from Courtenay, who was thereafter reluctant to attend the court in London. In 1441, Courtenay was appointed as Steward of the Duchy of Cornwall, a nearly identical post to Royal Steward for Cornwall which had been granted to Sir William Bonville in 1437, for life. A week later in May 1441, the warrant was retracted. Disputes arose between the two which contemporary records portray as reaching the status of a private war. Two men wearing Courtenay livery attacked Sir Philip Chetwynd, a friend of Bonville, on the road to London, apparent evidence that the council's arbitration of November 1440 had failed. Courtenay and Bonville were summoned before the King in December 1441, and were publicly reconciled. Tensions remained, however, and this may have been a factor in the crown's requests to both Courtenay, who initially refused, and Bonville to serve in France, Bonville as seneschal of Gascony from 1442 to 1446 and Courtenay at Pont-l'Évêque in Normandy in 1446. This is one of the few times that Courtenay served abroad, for he had refused in March 1443, seemingly preferring to spend his time bolstering his position in Devon or at court. While Bonville was abroad, the King released Devon from his debts, including the recognisance for good behaviour, probably remitted by the influence of father-in-law, John Beaufort, Earl of Somerset.

== Royal appointments ==
=== Commissions ===
His advantageous marriage to Margaret Beaufort brought him links to the "court party", and Courtenay began to be selected by the king to serve on Westcountry commissions and was granted an annuity of £100 for his services.

=== Other ===
1445 marked a fleeting high point in Courtenay's fortunes, with his appointment as High Steward of England at Queen Margaret's coronation on 25 May. Only the year before, March 1444, Bonville had identified himself with Suffolk, at Margaret's betrothal in Rouen.

== Abandonment of Beauforts ==
The deaths of his brother-in-law John Beaufort, 1st Duke of Somerset, in 1444, and of the leader of the party Cardinal Beaufort, second son of John of Gaunt, in 1447, removed Beaufort leadership of the 'court' party, leaving William de la Pole, 1st Duke of Suffolk, as the most influential figure in national politics. While there is no evidence of direct antagonism between Courtenay and the Duke of Suffolk, the latter appeared to favour the Bonvilles. Sir William Bonville enjoyed links with Suffolk and married his daughter to William Tailboys, one of the Duke's closest associates. Perhaps the most dramatic illustration of this favour was Bonville's elevation to the peerage, presumably at the direction of Suffolk, as Baron Bonville of Chewton Mendip in 1449.

== Switch to Yorkist party ==
This promotion of his enemy Bonville may have prompted Devon to oppose the 'Court party' and to serve with his friend Richard Plantagenet, 3rd Duke of York during Jack Cade's Rebellion. Courtenay switched allegiance to York, who with the Duke of Norfolk took control briefly of London. He remained loyal to York during the Parliament of November 1450, when they invoked the support of the Commons to raise taxation. Having rescued the Duke of Somerset from an angry London mob, York himself had to flee, taking refuge on the Earl of Devon's barge rowing down the Thames. It is hardly surprising that Devon began to become associated with York, who had assumed the leadership of the "opposition" party. The parlous state of national politics (whether the king was a vindictive factionalist or an inane non-entity is largely irrelevant in this context) combined with what seems like a reckless and violent element in Courtenay's own character, led to a further campaign of violence against Bonville and the Suffolk-aligned James Butler, 5th Earl of Ormond and Earl of Wiltshire. Courtenay and his troops attempted to capture Butler near Bath in Wiltshire before returning to besiege Bonville in Taunton Castle. The arrival of York (whether to suppress or aid the disturbances is uncertain) caused the two sides to make peace which, unsurprisingly, had no real meaning. York then embarked on his abortive attempt to take control of the royal government by force, his only allies being Courtenay and his sometime-associate, Edward Brooke, 6th Baron Cobham.

In the West Country, Courtenay hounded Bonville without mercy, and pursued him to Taunton Castle and laid siege to it. York arrived to lift the siege, and imprisoned Bonville, who was nevertheless quickly released. This exploit ended with the disgrace of all three 'Yorkists' and their submission to royal mercy in March. The King had issued an arrest warrant on 24 September 1451, drafted by Somerset, to be enforced by Butler and Bonville. The Yorkist rebellions prompted royal commissions for Buckingham and Bonville on 14 February 1452. A direct summons without delay was ordered by Royal Proclamation on 17 February to bring Courtenay and Lord Cobham to London.

=== Treason charge ===
Courtenay was charged with treason and briefly imprisoned in Wallingford Castle, before appearing on trial before the House of Lords. His disgrace and political isolation allowed his Devonshire rivals to consolidate their positions, further undermining his decreased standing in the county. Bonville acquired all royal commissions in the south-west.

== Resurgence of York ==
King Henry VI's madness and York's appointment as Protector in 1453/4 resulted in a partial rally in Courtenay's fortunes, including his re-appointment to commissions of the peace in the south-western counties, the key barometer of the local balance of power. He was a member of the Royal Council until April 1454. Courtenay was bound over to keep the peace with a fine of 1,000 marks, but ignored its restrictions. Threatened by the council on 3 June, he was forced on 24 July to make a new bond.

== Abandonment by York ==
This was, however, the end of Courtenay's links with York, whose increasingly tight links with the Neville earls of Salisbury and Warwick led to an alignment with Bonville away from Courtenay. This culminated in the marriage of William Bonville, 6th Baron Harington, Bonville's grandson, to Salisbury's daughter, Katherine. Courtenay did not endear himself to Somerset either, as he and his sons repeatedly disrupted the sessions of the commissioners of the peace in Exeter during 1454/5, which did not assist Protector Somerset in promoting his role as the guardian of law and order. Courtenay was present at the First Battle of St Albans, and was wounded. York, however, still considered him at least neutral as the duke's letters addressed to the King on the eve of battle were delivered to the king via the apparently still trusted hands of Courtenay.

== Final assault on Bonville ==
Perhaps inspired by the way the Nevilles and York had forcefully ended their respective feuds with the Percies and the Duke of Somerset in the battle, Courtenay returned to Devon and commenced a further campaign of violence against Bonville and his allies, who were now attached to Warwick's party. The violence began in October 1455 with the horrific murder by Courtenay allies of Nicholas Radford, an eminent Westcountry lawyer, Recorder of Exeter and one of Bonville's councillors. Several contemporary accounts, including the Paston Letters, record this event with the ensuing mock-funeral and coronary inquest accompanied by the singing of highly inappropriate songs, in tones of shock and horror unusual during the blunted sensitivities of the fifteenth century. Among the murderers was Thomas Courtenay, the earl's son and later successor. Parliament, meeting in November 1455, reported 800 horsemen and 4,000 infantry running amok across Devon. On 3 November 1455 Courtenay with his sons, Thomas Carrew of Ashwater and a considerable force of 1,000 men occupied the city of Exeter, nominally controlled by Bonville as castellan of the royal castle of Exeter, which they continued to control until 23 December 1455. Courtenay had before warned the populace that Bonville was approaching with a 'great multitude' to sack the city. On 3 November 1455 Bonville's men setting out from his seat at Shute had looted the Earl's nearby house at Colcombe Castle, Colyton, and Bonville promised his support to the earl's distant cousin, Sir Philip Courtenay of Powderham. Dozens of men violated consecrated ground and Radford's valuables were extracted from the cathedral and his house in Exeter was also robbed. Village-dwellers with Bonville connections were assaulted by Devon's men. Powderham Castle, home to the earl's estranged cousin, Sir Philip Courtenay (d. 1463), an ally of Bonville, was besieged on 15 November 1455, the earl's weaponry now including a serpentine cannon. Bonville attempted to relieve the castle but was repulsed as the Earl threatened to batter down its walls. Finally battle was joined directly between Bonville and Courtenay at the Battle of Clyst Heath, at Clyst Bridge, just southeast of Exeter on 15 December 1455. While it seems that Bonville was put to flight, the number of dead or wounded is entirely unknown. Two days later Thomas Carrew with 500 of Courtenay's retainers pillaged Shute, seizing a bounty of looted goods. Courtenay and his men left Exeter on 21 December 1455 and shortly afterwards submitted to York at Shaftesbury in Dorset. Early in December 1455, the King had dismissed Devon from the Commission of Peace, and citizens of Exeter had been instructed not to help his army of "misrule" in any way.

== Aftermath of Clyst Heath ==
Devon was incarcerated in the Tower. Originally, the government planned to bring him to trial for treason but this was abandoned once King Henry VI returned to sanity in February 1456, and York was removed as Protector. Courtenay was also returned to the commission of the peace for Devonshire, seemingly the work of Queen Margaret of Anjou who had taken personal control of the court. Courtenay had cultivated links with Queen Margaret, and an alliance was sealed by the marriage of his son and heir, Sir Thomas Courtenay, to the Queen's kinswoman, Marie, the daughter of Charles, Count of Maine. Despite having been banned from entering and leading armed men into Exeter and holding assemblies, 500 men under John Courtenay entered the High Street on 8 April 1456. His rivals, Philip Courtenay and Lord Fitzwarin, were prevented from exercising commissions as Justices of the Peace, and were forced to leave the city. Butler, Bonville's patron, and Sir John Fortescue, Chief Justice, arrived with a large entourage to investigate under a commission of oyer et terminer. They rejected Courtenay's petition to have Bonville's sheriffdom of Devon removed. Two years later his sons, Thomas and Henry Courtenay, were absolved of the murder of Nicholas Radford.

Courtenay was restored to the bench of JPs and was made Keeper of the Park of Clarendon in February 1457, and Keeper of Clarendon Forest in Wiltshire on 17 July 1457.

== Marriage and issue ==
Arms of Beaufort family, Earls and Dukes of Somerset: The Royal Arms of England (Quarterly, 1st & 4th: Azure, three fleurs de lis or (France); 2nd & 3rd: Gules, three lions passant guardant in pale or (England)) all within a bordure compony argent and azure for difference

At some time after 1421, Thomas de Courtenay married Lady Margaret Beaufort, daughter of John Beaufort, 1st Earl of Somerset (the first of the four illegitimate children of John of Gaunt (son of King Edward III of England) by his mistress, Katherine Swynford, later his wife) by his wife, Lady Margaret Holland. Margaret was thus the sister of Henry Beaufort, 2nd Earl of Somerset, of John Beaufort, 1st Duke of Somerset, of Thomas Beaufort, Count of Perche, of Joan Beaufort, Queen of Scotland, and of Edmund Beaufort, 2nd Duke of Somerset. Thomas and Margaret had three sons and six daughters:

- Thomas Courtenay, 6th/14th Earl of Devon (1432 – 3 April 1461), was taken prisoner at the Battle of Towton, and beheaded at York on 3 April 1461, when the earldom was forfeited.
- Sir Henry Courtenay (d. 1467/9), Esquire, of West Coker, Somerset, beheaded for treason in the market place at Salisbury, Wiltshire on 17 January 1469 (or 4 March 1467). As the earldom had been forfeited following the execution of his elder brother in 1461, he is not generally considered to have inherited from him the title "Earl of Devon", although for example, Debrett's Peerage, 1968, gives him as the 7th Earl and successor to his brother.
- John Courtenay, 7th/15th Earl of Devon (1435 – 3 May 1471), was restored to the earldom in 1470 by the Lancastrians in exile, and later slain at the Battle of Tewkesbury on 4 May 1471.
- Joan Courtenay (born c. 1441), who married, firstly, Sir Roger Clifford, second son of Thomas Clifford, 8th Baron de Clifford, who was beheaded after the Battle of Bosworth in 1485. She married, secondly, Sir William Knyvet of Buckenham, Norfolk.
- Elizabeth Courtenay (born c. 1449), who married, before March 1490, Sir Hugh Conway.
- Anne Courtenay.
- Eleanor Courtenay.
- Maud Courtenay.
- Agnes Courtenay (1452 – 7 January 1485), who married Richard Saunders (1452–1480) of Charlwood, Surrey.

=== Monument to Margaret Beaufort ===
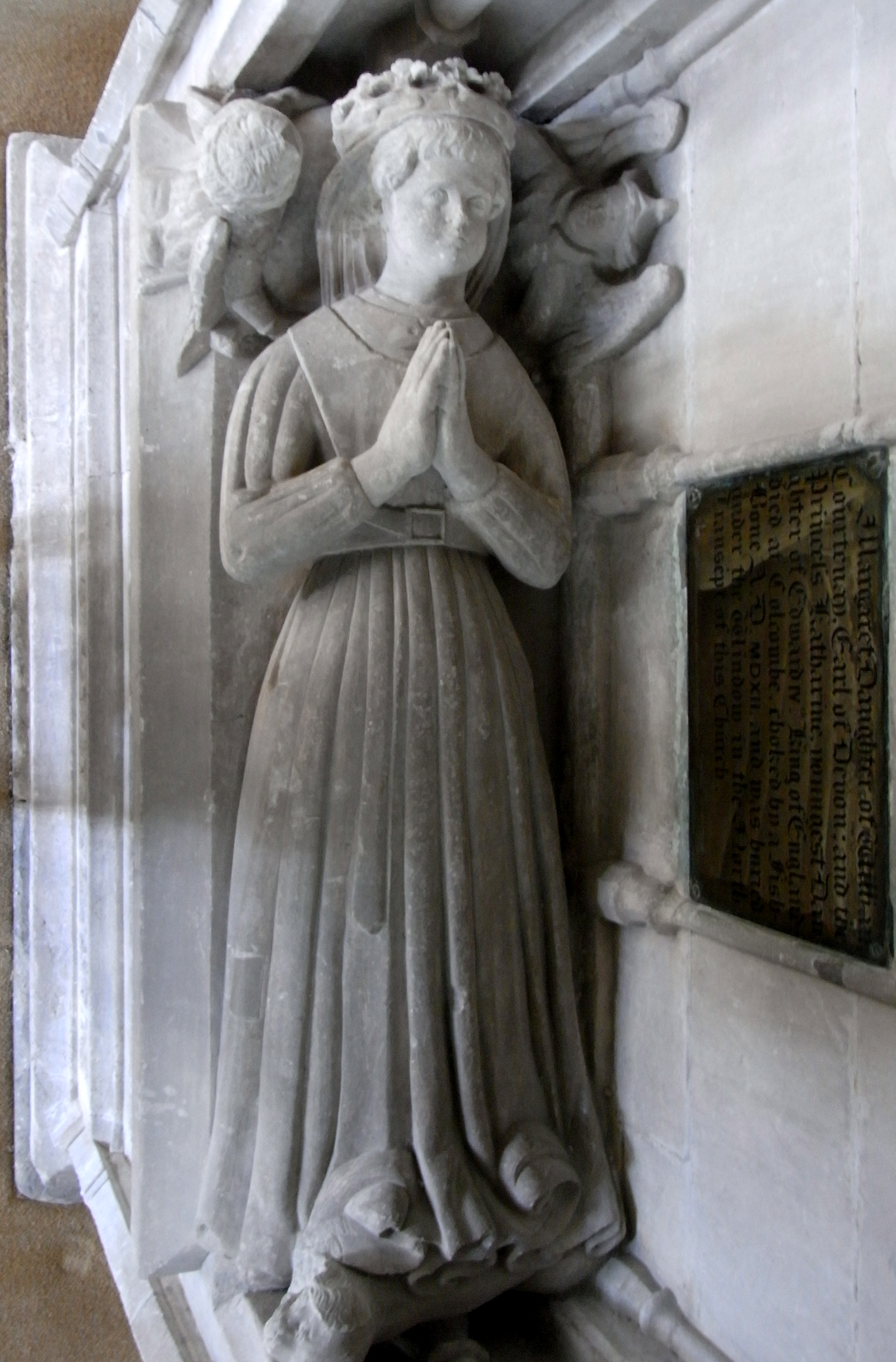
Effigy of an unknown female, possibly Margaret Beaufort, Church of St Andrew, Colyton, Devon

An effigy identified by tradition as "little choke-a-bone", Margaret Courtenay (d. 1512), an infant daughter of William Courtenay, 1st Earl of Devon (1475–1511) by his wife Princess Catherine of York (d. 1527), the sixth daughter of King Edward IV (1461–1483) exists in Colyton Church in Devon. The Courtenay residence of Colcombe Castle was in the parish of Colyton. However, modern authorities have suggested, on the basis of the monument's heraldry, the effigy to be Margaret Beaufort (c. 1409 – 1449), the wife of Thomas de Courtenay, 5th Earl of Devon (1414–1458).

The effigy is only about three feet in length, much smaller than usual for an adult. The face and head were renewed in 1907, and are said to have been based on the sculptor's own infant daughter. A 19th-century brass tablet above is inscribed: "Margaret, daughter of William Courtenay Earl of Devon and the Princess Katharine youngest daughter of Edward IVth King of England, died at Colcombe choked by a fish-bone AD MDXII and was buried under the window in the north transept of this church".

==== Heraldry ====
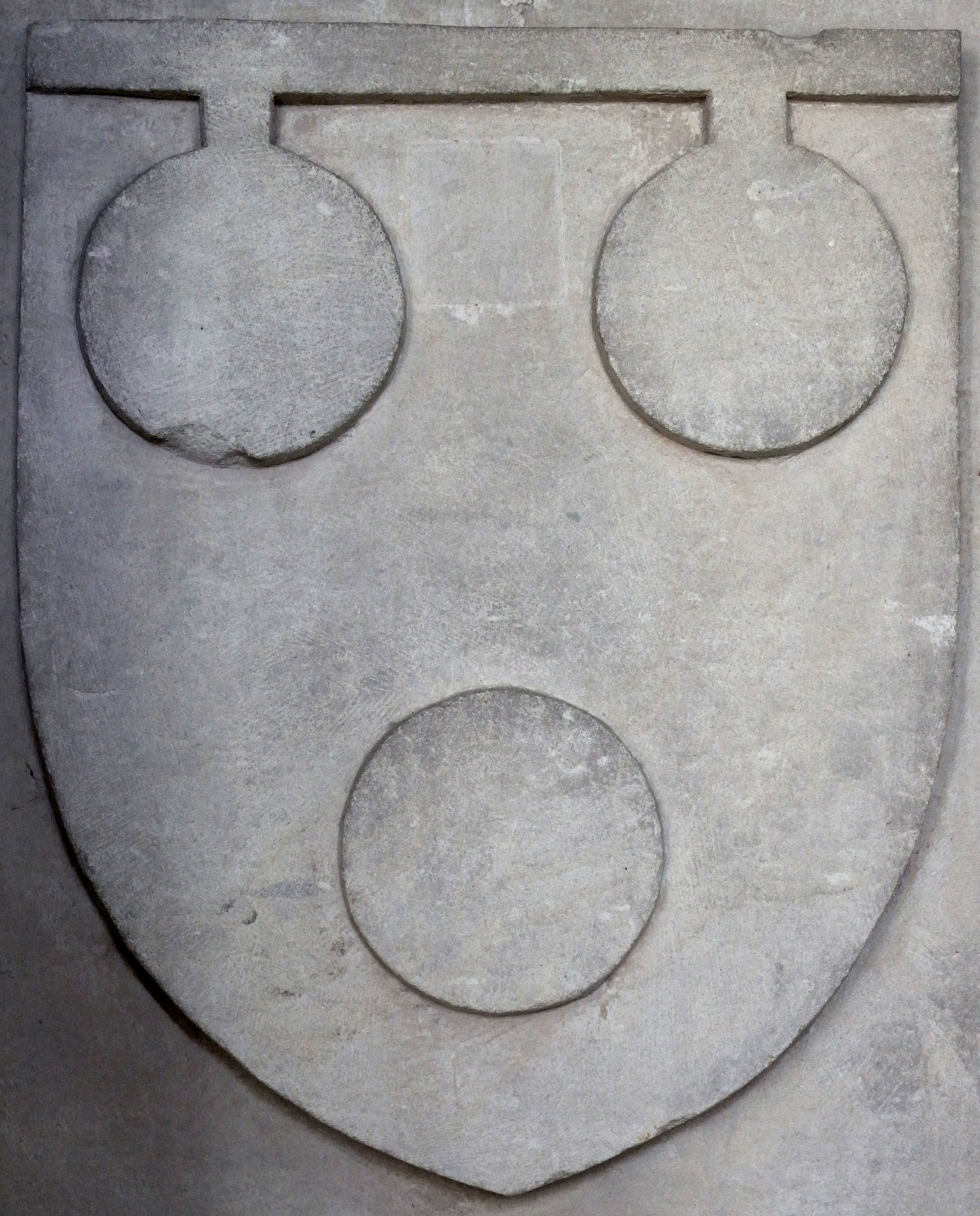
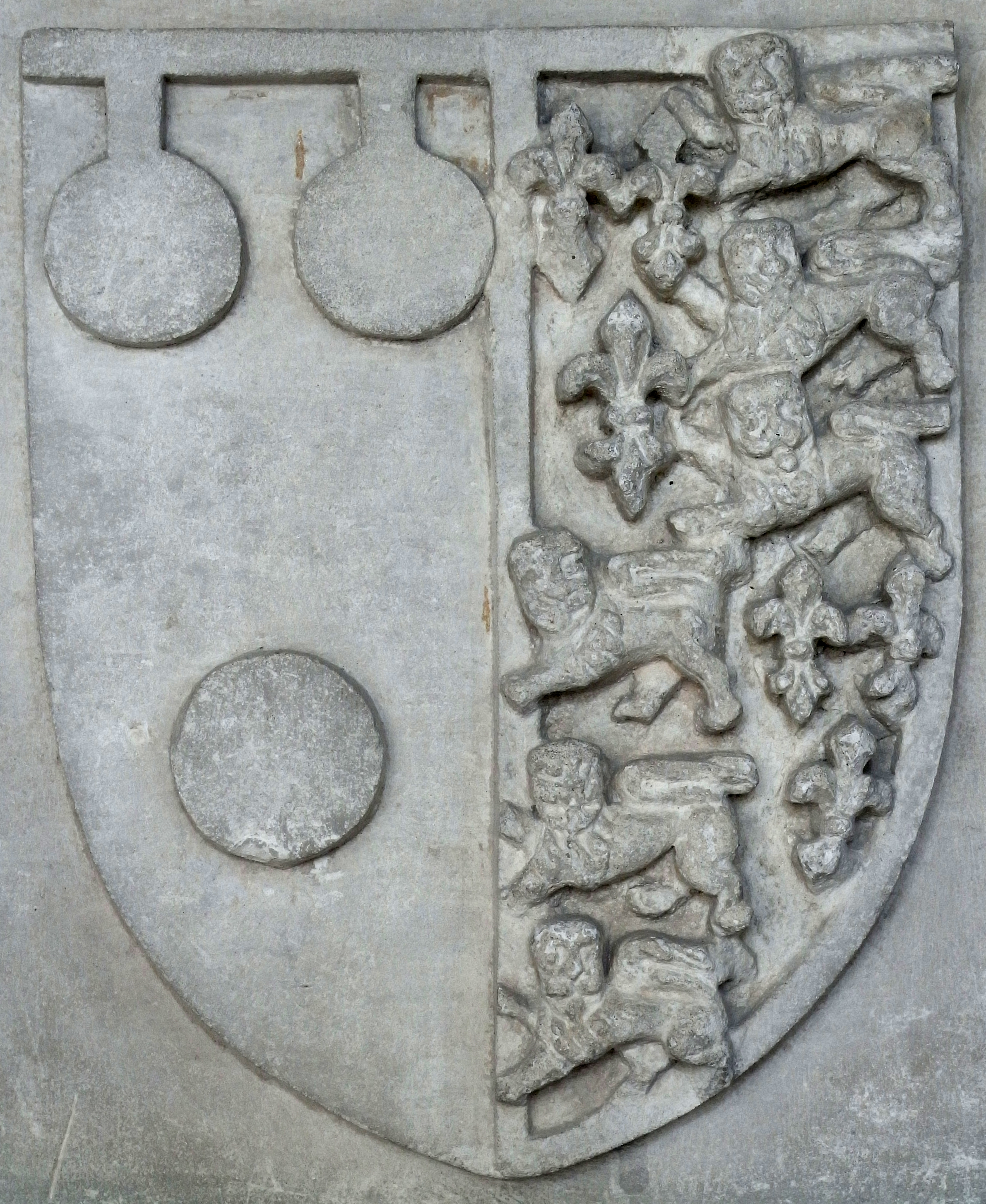
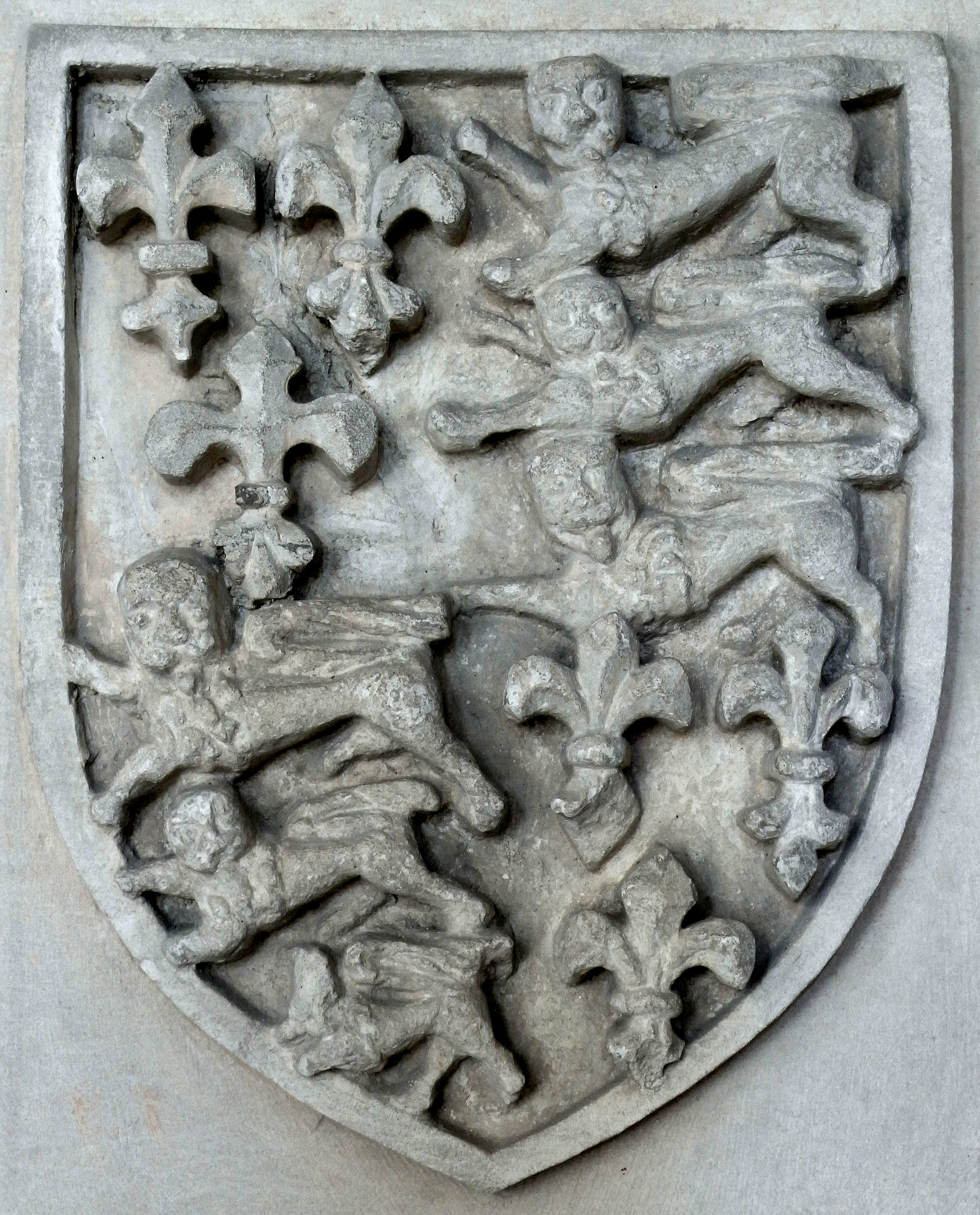
Arrangement of heraldic escutcheons above female effigy in Colyton Church. left arms of Courtenay (without border); centre: arms of Courtenay (without border) impaling royal arms of England (with border); right: royal arms of England (with border). The interpretation of the existence or otherwise of a heraldic bordure is significant to the correct identification of the effigy.

Three sculpted heraldic shields of arms exist above the effigy, showing the arms of Courtenay, Courtenay impaling the royal arms of England and the royal arms of England. Later authorities have suggested, on the basis of the monument's heraldry, the effigy to be the wife of Thomas de Courtenay, 5th Earl of Devon (1414–1458), namely Lady Margaret Beaufort (c. 1409 – 1449), daughter of John Beaufort, 1st Marquess of Somerset, 1st Marquess of Dorset (1373–1410), KG (later only 1st Earl of Somerset) (the first of the four illegitimate children of John of Gaunt, 1st Duke of Lancaster (4th son of King Edward III), and his mistress Katherine Swynford, later his wife) by his wife Margaret Holland. The basis of this re-attribution is the supposed fact that the "royal arms" shown are not the arms of King Edward IV, but rather the arms of Beaufort. The arms of Beaufort are the royal arms of England differenced within a bordure compony argent and azure. The relief sculpture does indeed show a border, albeit a thin one and not compony, around the royal arms, with such border omitted from the Courtenay arms.

== Death ==
Courtenay received a summons to appear with York before the King in London at the Loveday Award. He broke his journey at Abingdon Abbey, and died there on 3 February 1458. A contemporary chronicler asserted that he had been poisoned by the Prior on the queen's orders, which is perhaps unlikely considering the earl's alliance with the queen. In his will, the earl requested burial in the Courtenay Chantry Chapel of Exeter Cathedral. The will was proved at Lambeth on 21 February 1458, and an inquisition post mortem was taken in 1467.

The earl was succeeded by his eldest son, Thomas Courtenay, 14th Earl of Devon, who was beheaded at York on 3 April 1461 after the Battle of Towton, and attainted by Parliament in November 1461, whereby the earldom was forfeited.

== Selected reading ==
- Bellamy, J. G. (1970). The Law of Treason in England in the Later Middle Ages. Cambridge University Press. ISBN 978-0-521-07830-6.
- Bellamy, J. G. (1973). Crime and Public Order in England in the Later Middle Ages. Routledge & Kegan Paul. ISBN 978-0-7100-7421-8.
- Carpenter, C. (1997). The Wars of the Roses: Politics and constitution in England, 1437–1509. Cambridge University Press. ISBN 978-0-521-31874-7.
- Cherry, M. (1979). "The Courtenay Earls of Devon: The Formation and Disintegration of a Late Medieval Aristocratic Affinity". Southern History. 1: 71–97.
- Cherry, M. (1981a). "The struggle for power in mid-fifteenth century Devonshire". In R.A. Griffiths (ed.). Patronage, the Crown and the Provinces in Later Medieval England. Sutton. pp. 123–44. ISBN 978-0-904387-45-2.
- Griffiths, R. A. (1975). "Duke Richard of York's intentions in 1450 and the origins of the Wars of the Roses". Journal of Medieval History. 1 (2): 187–209. doi:10.1016/0304-4181(75)90023-8.
- Griffiths, R. A., ed. (1981b). Patronage, the Crown and the Provinces in Later Medieval England. Gloucester: Alan Sutton. ISBN 978-0-904387-45-2.
- Griffiths, R.A. (1 January 1984). "The King's Council and the first Protectorate of the Duke of York, 1453–1454". The English Historical Review. 99 (390): 67–82. doi:10.1093/ehr/XCIX.CCCXC.67. JSTOR 567910.
- Griffiths, R. A. (28 May 2015). "Henry VI (1421–1471)". Oxford Dictionary of National Biography (online) (online ed.). Oxford University Press. doi:10.1093/ref:odnb/12953. (Subscription, Wikipedia Library access or UK public library membership required.)
- Jacob, E. F. (1988) [1961-12-31]. The Fifteenth Century, 1399–1485. Oxford History of England. Vol. 6 (reprint ed.). Oxford: Clarendon Press.
- Kleineke, Hannes (2007). "'The Kynges Cite': Exeter in the Wars of the Roses". In Linda Clark (ed.). The Fifteenth Century 7: Conflicts, Consequences and the Crown in the Late Middle Ages. Woodbridge: Boydell Press. pp. 137–156. ISBN 978-1-84383-333-8.
- McFarlane, K. B. (1973). The Nobility of Later Medieval England. Clarendon Press. ISBN 978-0-19-822362-7.
- Myers, A. R., ed. (1969). English Historical Documents 1327–1485. Eyre & Spottiswoode. ISBN 978-0-413-23310-3.
- Ross, C. D. (1986). The Wars of the Roses. Thames & Hudson. ISBN 978-0-500-27407-1.
- Seward, D. (1995). The Wars of the Roses; and the lives of five men and women in the fifteenth century. London: Constable.
- Sumption, J. (23 August 1999). Trial by Battle: The Hundred Years War 1. Faber. ISBN 978-0-571-20095-5.
- Sumption, J. (22 October 2001). Trial by Fire: The Hundred Years War 2. Faber. ISBN 978-0-571-20737-4.
- Tuck, A. (16 December 1999). Crown and Nobility: England 1272–1461. Blackwell Classic Histories of England (2nd ed.). Blackwell. ISBN 978-0-631-21466-3.
- Virgoe, R. (1970). "The Composition of the King's Council, 1437–61". Bulletin of the Institute of Historical Research. 43 (108): 134–60. doi:10.1111/j.1468-2281.1970.tb01659.x.

Peerage of England
Preceded by Hugh de Courtenay	Earl of Devon; 1422–1458	Succeeded by Thomas Courtenay
