= Hugh de Courtenay, 4th/12th Earl of Devon =

English nobleman

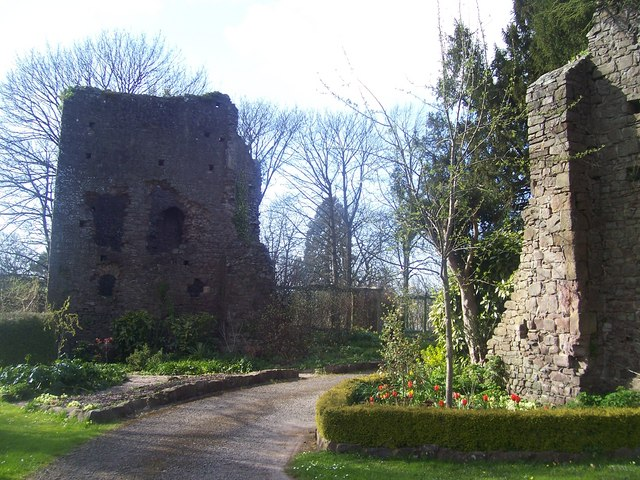
- Ruins of Tiverton Castle, seat of the earls of Devon
- Born: 1389
- Died: 16 June 1422 (aged 32–33)
- Noble family: Courtenay
- Spouse: Anne Talbot
- Issue: Thomas Courtenay, 13th Earl of Devon
- Father: Edward de Courtenay, 11th Earl of Devon
- Mother: Maud Camoys

Hugh de Courtenay, 4th/12th Earl of Devon (1389 – 16 June 1422) was an English nobleman, son of the 3rd/11th earl of Devon, and father of the 5th/13th earl. The ordinal number given to the early Courtenay earls of Devon depends on whether the earldom is deemed a new creation by the letters patent granted 22 February 1334/5 or whether it is deemed a restitution of the old dignity of the de Redvers family. Authorities differ in their opinions, and thus alternative ordinal numbers exist, given here.

== Family ==
Hugh de Courtenay was the second, but first surviving, son of Edward Courtenay, 3rd/11th Earl of Devon, 'the blind Earl', and Maud de Camoys, daughter of Sir John de Camoys of Gressenhall, Norfolk, by his second wife, Elizabeth Latimer, the daughter of William Latimer, 3rd Baron Latimer (c. 1300 – 1335). His brother Sir Edward de Courtenay, died in 1418, making him his father's heir. He also had two other siblings, a brother James who died without issue and a sister Elizabeth, who married, firstly, John Harington, 4th Baron Harington and, secondly, William Bonville, 1st Baron Bonville.

== Career ==
Courtenay was knighted on 13 October 1399 at the coronation of King Henry IV. He was appointed 'captain of a fleet to guard the sea' from March to August 1418, and the king's lieutenant at sea from April to November 1419. He succeeded to the earldom of Devon at the death of his father on 5 December 1419.

Courtenay died on 16 June 1422, aged 33, and was succeeded in the earldom by his son, Thomas.

== Marriage and issue ==
Courtenay married Anne Talbot, daughter of Richard Talbot, 4th Baron Talbot (d. 8 or 9 September 1396) and Ankaret Le Strange (d. 1 June 1413), daughter of John le Strange, 4th Baron Strange of Blackmere (1332–1361). Anne Talbot was the sister of John Talbot, 1st Earl of Shrewsbury (c. 1392 – 17 July 1453), whom Thomas Nashe termed 'brave Talbot, the terror of the French'.

They had at least two sons, Thomas de Courtenay, 5th/13th Earl of Devon, 6th Baron Courtenay, and Henry Courtenay.

It is believed they also had a daughter, Dame Anne Courtenay, who married, as her second husband, John Yerde, esq., of the manors of Denton and Trappinton in Kent and East Cheam in Surrey. Anne died in 1453 and was buried along with her husband John in Cheam where her arms show Courtenay on the dexter and Yerde on the sinister side due to Anne being higher-ranking than her husband. The Yerde family had close connections with the Botreaux family.

About 1432/3, Courtenay's widow Anne married John Botreaux. She died on 16 January 1441.

== Footnotes ==
Peerage of England
Preceded by Edward Courtenay	Earl of Devon; 1419–1422	Succeeded by Thomas Courtenay
