= Clyst Heath =

Place in Devon, England

Coordinates: 50.7115°N 3.4745°W

Today Clyst Heath is a suburb to the south east of the city of Exeter, Devon, England. An area of relatively high ground to the west of the River Clyst, it remained heathland until the early nineteenth century when it was cultivated for the first time.

Two notable battles took place on the heath, in 1455 and 1549. The 1:25000 Ordnance Survey map shows the conventional symbol for both battles at grid reference SX965912, just north of Sandy Park rugby stadium.

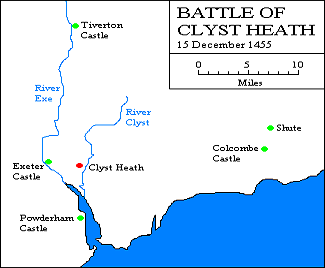
Map showing places significant to the 1455 battle

== Battle of Clyst Heath (1455) ==
The Courtenay family of Tiverton Castle and Colcombe Castle, who had been earls of Devon since 1335, were challenged in the 15th century by the rise of the Bonville family of Shute. The Bonville–Courtenay feud during the Wars of the Roses resulted in several acts of violence, culminating on 15 December 1455 when Thomas Courtenay, Earl of Devon and William Bonville met decisively at the Battle of Clyst Heath, where Bonville was defeated and after which the Earl sacked and pillaged Shute.

== Battle of Clyst Heath (1549) ==
In the evening of 5 August 1549, during the Prayer Book Rebellion, John Russell, 1st Earl of Bedford and Lord William Grey and their troops had pitched camp on Clyst Heath. Russell and Grey were concerned about the burden of the large number of rebel prisoners that had been captured from previous encounters at Fenny Bridges, Woodbury Common and Clyst St Mary. An order was issued that the prisoners should be killed, which was done. According to John Hayward, more than nine hundred prisoners were slain.

The following day the rebels attacked the camp of the Royal army and the subsequent battle lasted the entire day, with heavy losses on both sides. Lord Russell's troops were finally victorious, but John Hooker later reported:

Great was the slaughter and cruel was the fight and such was the valour and stoutness of these men [the rebels] that the Lord Grey reported himself that he never in all the wars he had been did know the like.

== See also ==
- Prayer Book Rebellion
- Digby, Devon
