= John Courtenay, 15th Earl of Devon =

English nobleman

Sir John Courtenay
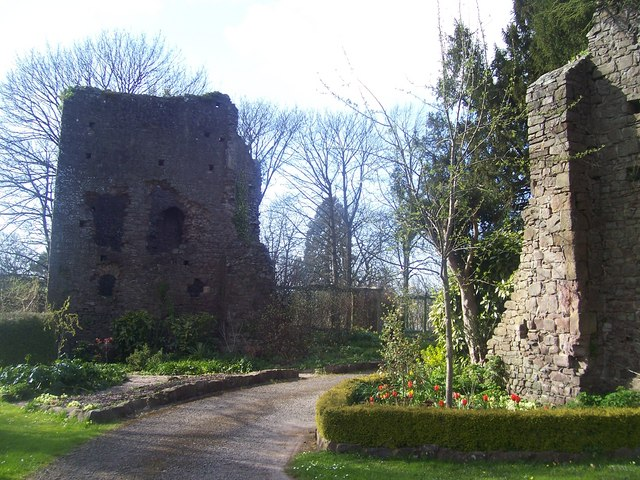
- Ruins of Tiverton Castle, seat of the Earls of Devon
- Born: c. 1435
- Died: 4 May 1471; Tewkesbury, England
- Noble family: Courtenay
- Father: Thomas Courtenay, 13th Earl of Devon
- Mother: Margaret Beaufort

Sir John Courtenay (c. 1435 – 4 May 1471) was the third son of Thomas Courtenay, 13th Earl of Devon, and Margaret Beaufort, and was styled Earl of Devon by Lancastrians in exile, following the execution of his brother the 14th earl in 1461.

== Family ==
Courtenay is said to have been born in 1435, the third son of Thomas Courtenay, 13th Earl of Devon, by Margaret Beaufort, the daughter of John Beaufort, 1st Earl of Somerset. Through his mother, Courtenay was a great-great-grandson of King Edward III. He had two brothers and five sisters:

- Thomas Courtenay, 14th Earl of Devon (1432 – 3 April 1461), who married, shortly after 9 September 1456, Mary of Anjou, illegitimate daughter of Charles, Count of Maine. There were no issue of the marriage. He was taken prisoner at the Battle of Towton, and beheaded at York on 3 April 1461.
- Henry Courtenay (d. 17 January 1469), esquire, of West Coker, Somerset, beheaded for treason in the marketplace at Salisbury, Wiltshire on 17 January 1469.
- Joan Courtenay (born c. 1447), who married, firstly, Sir Roger Clifford, second son of Thomas Clifford, 8th Baron de Clifford, beheaded after Bosworth in 1485. She married, secondly, Sir William Knyvet of Buckenham, Norfolk.
- Elizabeth Courtenay (born c. 1449), who married, before March 1490, Sir Hugh Conway.
- Anne Courtenay.
- Eleanor Courtenay.
- Maud Courtenay.

== Career ==
John Courtenay is said to have been originally intended for a career in the church. He was knighted by his brother, Thomas Courtenay, 6th/14th Earl of Devon, after the Battle of Wakefield. After the Battle of Mortimer's Cross, the future King Edward IV of England marched and took the capital from the Lancastrians. Parliament voted an attainder on his opposition, and John declared a traitor. The effect of the attainder was to terminate the Barony of Okehampton (creation 1299), so that the Earldom inherited from the Redvers family was in abeyance, passing laterally to the descendants of Courtenay's sisters The new King, Edward IV, marched north and sealed his reign with the bloody victory at the Battle of Towton, following which his brother was beheaded. About 1465, Courtenay was in exile in France with Queen Margaret of Anjou (wife of King Henry VI of England). He was titular Earl of Devon from 1469.

At the readeption of King Henry VI on 9 October 1470, Courtenay was restored to his ancestral lands, which earlier that year had been granted by King Edward IV to John Neville, along with the title of Marquess of Montagu, as compensation for the loss of his earldom of Northumberland. However, Courtenay gained little political power, being appointed only to "a solitary commission [of the peace] in Devon".

Following Edward IV's return to England to challenge the restored Lancastrian regime in 1471, Courtenay was in London with Henry VI and Edmund Beaufort, Duke of Somerset, while King Edward gathered troops in the East Midlands and manoeuvred against the Lancastrians under Richard Neville, Earl of Warwick. However, Somerset and Courtenay left the city to rendezvous in the south-west of England with Margaret of Anjou and her son, Edward of Westminster, Prince of Wales, who were returning from France. This thwarted Warwick's hopes of trapping Edward IV between his own army and the forces in London, and cleared the way for Edward IV to occupy the capital and capture Henry VI. Warwick was defeated and killed by Edward IV at the Battle of Barnet, just outside London, on 14 April.

Queen Margaret landed in England two days later, and met Devon and Somerset in Cerne Abbey, where they "assured her that their cause was far from lost". They received commissions from the Prince of Wales to raise an army in the south-west. Courtenay gathered forces from the traditional Courtenay powerbase in Devon, while Somerset raised troops in Cornwall. Marching to unite with other Lancastrian forces being assembled in the West Midlands and Wales, they were intercepted by King Edward IV and brought to battle at Tewkesbury on 4 May 1471. Courtenay, commanding the Lancastrian left, was among those slain on the field- "in plain battle"—when the division "took to flight". He was buried, with the other noble dead, in Tewkesbury Abbey churchyard.

== Footnotes ==
Peerage of England
Preceded by Thomas Courtenay	Earl of Devon; 1461–1471	Extinct
