= Margaret Beaufort, Countess of Devon =

English noblewoman

Margaret Beaufort
- Countess of Devon
- Born: c. 1409; Westminster, London, England
- Died: 1449 (aged ~40)
- Noble family: Beaufort
- Spouse: Thomas de Courtenay, 13th Earl of Devon
- Issue: Thomas Courtenay, 14th Earl of Devon; Henry Courtenay; Sir John Courtenay; Joan Courtenay; Elizabeth Courtenay; Anne Courtenay; Eleanor Courtenay; Maud Courtenay; Agnes Courtenay
- Father: John Beaufort, 1st Earl of Somerset
- Mother: Margaret Holland

Margaret Beaufort, Countess of Devon (c. 1409 – 1449) was an English noblewoman.

== Origins ==
Arms of Beaufort family, Earls and Dukes of Somerset: The Royal Arms of England (Quarterly, 1st & 4th: Azure, three fleurs de lis or (France); 2nd & 3rd: Gules, three lions passant guardant in pale or (England)) all within a bordure compony argent and azure for difference

Margaret Beaufort was the second and youngest daughter of John Beaufort, 1st Earl of Somerset and Margaret Holland, the daughter of Thomas Holland, 2nd Earl of Kent by his wife Alice Fitzalan.

== Marriage and children ==
At some time after 1421 Margaret married Thomas Courtenay, 13th Earl of Devon (1414–1458), for whom she bore three sons and five daughters. Her sons were all killed or executed during the Wars of the Roses due to their strong adherence to the Lancastrian cause, and left no children, and thus the senior line of the Courtenays was extinguished. Margaret's children included the following:

- Thomas Courtenay, 14th Earl of Devon (1432 – 3 April 1461), eldest son and heir, who shortly after 9 September 1456 married Mary of Anjou, illegitimate daughter of Charles, Count of Maine. The marriage was without children. As a Lancastrian supporter during the Wars of the Roses, he was taken prisoner at the Battle of Towton, in which the victor was the Yorkist Edward IV, then attainted and beheaded at York. All his honours, including the original Earldom of Devon, became forfeited.
- Henry Courtenay (d. 17 January 1469), Esquire, of West Coker, Somerset. Due to the attainder of his elder brother he did not inherit the Earldom of Devon. Also a Lancastrian supporter, he was beheaded for treason in the market place at Salisbury, Wiltshire on 17 January 1469.
- John Courtenay, 15th/16th Earl of Devon, (1435 – 3 May 1471, youngest brother. After his eldest brother Thomas's attainder the earldom was in May 1469 bestowed away from the family by King Edward IV, the new Yorkist king, onto his supporter Humphrey Stafford, 1st Earl of Devon (c. 1439 – 1469) known as "an Earl of three months and no more". The Complete Peerage states him to have been 15th Earl of Devon, whilst other authorities treat his earldom as a new creation. Following the temporary reversal in the dominance of the Yorkists and the temporary restoration of the Lancastrian king Henry VI, Stafford was beheaded in August 1469 and John Courtenay was restored to the honours of his family, with the attainder of 1461 having been reversed and thereby became 15th/16th Earl of Devon. However, the position was short-lived as the Yorkists definitively terminated the reign of Henry VI in April 1471 at the Battle of Barnet and on 4 May 1471 Courtenay was slain during the Battle of Tewkesbury, having commanded the rear of the Lancastrian army. On his death the earldom fell into abeyance between his sisters or their descendants.
- Joan Courtenay, (born c. 1447), who married, firstly, Sir Roger Clifford, second son of Thomas Clifford, 8th Baron de Clifford, beheaded after Bosworth in 1485. She married, secondly, Sir William Knyvet of Buckenham, Norfolk.
- Elizabeth Courtenay (born c. 1449), who married, before March 1490, Sir Hugh Conway.
- Anne Courtenay
- Eleanor Courtenay
- Maud Courtenay
- Agnes Courtenay.

Two of Margaret's nieces were also named Margaret Beaufort. Margaret Beaufort, Countess of Stafford, was the mother of Henry Stafford, 2nd Duke of Buckingham, and Margaret Beaufort, Countess of Richmond and Derby, was the mother of King Henry VII.

== Ancestry ==
Ancestors of Margaret Beaufort, Countess of Devon

16. Edward II of England
8. Edward III of England
17. Isabella of France
4. John of Gaunt, 1st Duke of Lancaster
18. William I, Count of Hainaut
9. Philippa of Hainault
19. Joan of Valois
2. John Beaufort, 1st Earl of Somerset
10. Payne de Roet
5. Katherine Swynford
1. Margaret Beaufort, Countess of Devon
24. Robert de Holland, 1st Baron Holand
12. Thomas Holland, 1st Earl of Kent
25. Maud la Zouche
6. Thomas Holland, 2nd Earl of Kent
26. Edmund of Woodstock, 1st Earl of Kent
13. Joan of Kent
27. Margaret Wake, 3rd Baroness Wake of Liddell
3. Margaret Holland
28. Edmund Fitzalan, 9th Earl of Arundel
14. Richard Fitzalan, 10th Earl of Arundel
29. Alice de Warenne
7. Alice Fitzalan
30. Henry, 3rd Earl of Lancaster
15. Eleanor of Lancaster
31. Maud Chaworth
