= Thomas Beaufort, Count of Perche =

English nobleman

Thomas Beaufort
- styled Count of Perche
- Born: 1405
- Died: 2 October 1431 (aged 26); Louviers, France
- Noble family: Beaufort
- Father: John Beaufort, 1st Earl of Somerset
- Mother: Margaret Holland

Thomas Beaufort, styled 1st Count of Perche (c. 1405 – 3 October 1431) was a member of the Beaufort family and an English commander during the Hundred Years' War.

He was the third son of John Beaufort, 1st Earl of Somerset and his wife, Margaret Holland.

== Career ==
With his elder brother, Henry Beaufort, 2nd Earl of Somerset, Thomas joined in Henry V's 1419 campaigns in France. In 1421, he accompanied the king's younger brother Thomas of Lancaster to the fighting in Anjou. Lancaster was killed at the Battle of Baugé while John Beaufort, the new Earl of Somerset (following the death of Henry Beaufort, 2nd Earl of Somerset at the Siege of Rouen) and Thomas were captured. Thomas was eventually released around 1427 in a prisoner exchange negotiated by his uncle, Cardinal Beaufort.

As an able male member of the Beaufort family, Thomas rejoined the fighting almost immediately. He was granted the title Count of Perche in December 1427, his title being more a claim to land, rather than a recognized title since it was already held by the French Duke John II of Alençon. This was part of a continuing attempt by Cardinal Beaufort to carve out estates for his nephews from conquered French land. During the 1430 royal coronation expedition of Henry VI, Thomas was granted a retinue of 128 soldiers and 460 archers. He commanded soldiers at a battle at La Charité-sur-Loire in late 1430 and died 3 October 1431 at the siege of Louviers, three weeks before the city's fall.

== Arms ==
As the legitimised great-grandson of Edward III he bore his arms altered by a bordure gorbony argent and azure.

== Ancestry ==
Ancestors of Thomas Beaufort, Count of Perche

16. Edward II of England
8. Edward III of England
17. Isabella of France
4. John of Gaunt, 1st Duke of Lancaster
18. William I, Count of Hainaut
9. Philippa of Hainault
19. Joan of Valois
2. John Beaufort, 1st Earl of Somerset
10. Payne de Roet
5. Katherine Swynford
1. Thomas Beaufort, Count of Perche
24. Robert de Holland, 1st Baron Holand
12. Thomas Holland, 1st Earl of Kent
25. Maud la Zouche
6. Thomas Holland, 2nd Earl of Kent
26. Edmund of Woodstock, 1st Earl of Kent
13. Joan of Kent
27. Margaret Wake, 3rd Baroness Wake of Liddell
3. Margaret Holland
28. Edmund Fitzalan, 9th Earl of Arundel
14. Richard Fitzalan, 10th Earl of Arundel
29. Alice de Warenne
7. Alice Fitzalan
30. Henry, 3rd Earl of Lancaster
15. Eleanor of Lancaster
31. Maud Chaworth

== Notes ==
French nobility
New creation	Count of Perche; 1427–1431; Contested with John II of Alençon (1415–1474)	Extinct
