= Laurence Vernon =

15th-century Scoto-French noble

Laurence Vernon (Note: Known in French as Laurent Vernon), Seigneur of Montreuil-Bonnin, was an Scoto-French noble who took part in the Hundred Years War. He captured John Beaufort, Earl of Somerset, during the battle of Baugé in 1421 in France.

== Life ==
Laurence was a son of Louis Vernon and Jeanne Harpedanne. As part of the Scottish division of the French army during the battle of Baugé on 22 March 1421, he captured John Beaufort, Earl of Somerset. Beaufort was still in his minority. He later exchanged Beaufort in 1423 to King Charles VII of France for the sum of 40,000 ecus d'or and he was knighted and also granted the lordship of Montreuil-Bonnin in Poitou for his service.

== Family and issue ==
Vernon was married to Christine Goupille, they are known to have had the following issue:

- Jacques Vernon, married to Peronnelle de Liniers, had issue.
- Marie Vernon, married to Jean II de Vivonne, seigneur de Bougouin, had issue.
- Jeanne Vernon, married to Jean de Mareuil, seigneur de Mareuil, had issue.
