= Thomas Beaufort =

Thomas Beaufort may refer to:

- Thomas Beaufort, Duke of Exeter (1377–1426), English military commander, briefly Chancellor of England
- Thomas Beaufort, Count of Perche (c. 1405–1431), English military commander
