= House of Beaufort =

English noble family

- Arms of Beaufort: The royal arms of King Edward III differenced by a bordure componée argent and azure (later adjusted to France modern in the reign of Henry IV). The heraldic colours argent and azure had been symbols of the Earls of Lancaster.

- Heraldic badge of Beaufort: A portcullis chained or
- Parent house: House of Lancaster (legitimated)
- Country: Kingdom of England
- Founded: 1396; 630 years ago
- Founder: John Beaufort, 1st Earl of Somerset
- Current head: Henry Somerset, 12th Duke of Beaufort
- Titles: See list: Duke of Somerset; Duke of Exeter; Duke of Beaufort; Marquess of Worcester; Marquess of Somerset; Marquess of Dorset; Earl of Somerset; Earl of Dorset; Earl of Worcester; Earl of Glamorgan; Count of Perche, styled; Count of Mortain, styled; Count of Harcourt, styled; Baron Beaufort
- Connected families: House of Tudor (the mother of Henry VII was a Beaufort)
- Cadet branches: Somerset family (legitimated)

The House of Beaufort (/ˈboʊfərt/ BOH-fərt) is an English noble family which originated in the fourteenth century as the legitimated issue of John of Gaunt, 1st Duke of Lancaster, by Katherine Swynford. Gaunt and Swynford had four children: John Beaufort, 1st Earl of Somerset (1373–1410); Cardinal Henry Beaufort (1375–1447), Bishop of Winchester; Thomas Beaufort, 1st Duke of Exeter (1377–1426) and Joan Beaufort, Countess of Westmorland (1379–1440). When Gaunt finally married Swynford as his third wife in 1396, the Beauforts were legitimised by Pope Boniface IX and by royal proclamation of the reigning monarch King Richard II the following year.

John of Gaunt’s eldest legitimate son by his first wife Blanche of Lancaster was Henry Bolingbroke, who would eventually take the throne from Richard II as King Henry IV in 1399, the year of Gaunt’s death. Henry would be the first of the House of Lancaster (the main line descending from John of Gaunt) to rule England, and would eventually be succeeded by his son Henry V and grandson Henry VI. The Beauforts, as a junior branch of the House of Lancaster, would play an important role during the Wars of the Roses during the reign of the incompetent Henry VI. The eventual heiress of the Beaufort family was Lady Margaret Beaufort, only daughter of John Beaufort, 1st Duke of Somerset, who married Edmund Tudor, Earl of Richmond and became the mother of King Henry VII, the first Tudor monarch of England.

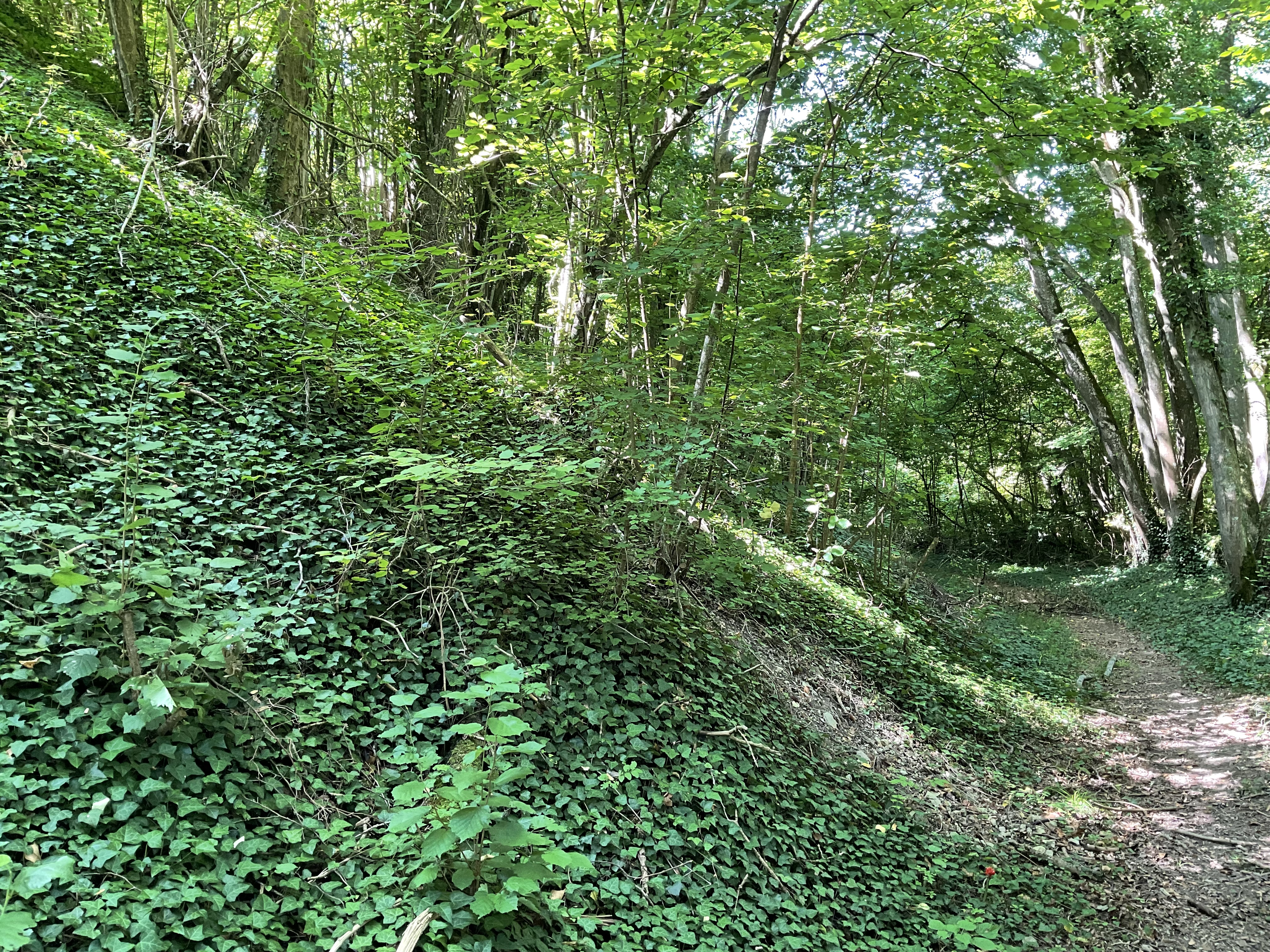
The surviving earthworks of Beaufort Castle in Montmorency Beaufort

The name Beaufort refers to the estate of Montmorency-Beaufort in Champagne, France, an ancient and seemingly important possession of the House of Lancaster. It is earliest associated with Edmund Crouchback, 1st Earl of Lancaster (the younger son of King Henry III) whose third son John of Lancaster (1286–1317) was "Seigneur de Beaufort". The estate of Beaufort was eventually inherited, with other vast possessions, by John of Gaunt (third surviving son of King Edward III) following his marriage to the heiress Blanche of Lancaster.

The House of Beaufort continues to exist in an illegitimate line descended from Charles Somerset, 1st Earl of Worcester, the illegitimate son of Henry Beaufort, 3rd Duke of Somerset. The senior representative of the House of Beaufort is Henry Somerset, 12th Duke of Beaufort, who is thus a direct male-line descendant, albeit via a legitimated and an illegitimate line, of King Henry II, the first Plantagenet King of England.

== History ==
The Beauforts were a powerful and wealthy family from the start, and rose to greater power after their half-brother became King Henry IV in 1399, having deposed his 1st cousin King Richard II. However, in 1406, Henry IV decided that although the Beauforts were legitimate, their line could not be used to make any claim to the throne. John Beaufort had already been created Earl of Somerset in 1397. His second son John became the first Duke of Somerset in 1443.

The second son (of John of Gaunt), Henry, became a bishop, Lord Chancellor, and a Cardinal; the third son, Thomas, became Duke of Exeter; and the daughter, Joan, married Ralph Neville, 1st Earl of Westmorland, as his second wife. Joan's many descendants include the Dukes of York, Warwick the "Kingmaker", the Dukes of Norfolk, the Dukes of Buckingham, the Earls of Northumberland, and Catherine Parr, the last queen of Henry VIII.

When the dynastic struggle of the Wars of the Roses broke out in the later fifteenth century, the Beauforts were the chief supporters of Henry VI and the House of Lancaster.

Henry VII traced his claim to the English crown through his mother, Margaret Beaufort, granddaughter of John Beaufort, 1st Earl of Somerset, and great-granddaughter of John of Gaunt.

The Beauforts suffered heavily in the Wars of the Roses. Edmund Beaufort, 2nd Duke of Somerset and his three elder sons (the 3rd and 4th Dukes and the Earl of Dorset), all lost their lives, leaving no legitimate male heir. The male line was however continued through Charles Somerset, 1st Earl of Worcester, the illegitimate son of Henry Beaufort, 3rd Duke of Somerset, who adopted the surname "Somerset" and used the arms of Beaufort but with a baton sinister for bastardy.

Henry Somerset, 3rd Marquess of Worcester (1629–1700), sixth in descent from Charles Somerset, 1st Earl of Worcester, assisted in the Restoration of the Monarchy to King Charles II, who in 1682 created him Duke of Beaufort. The title Duke of Somerset was no longer available, having been granted in 1547 by King Edward VI to his uncle Edward Seymour, Lord Protector, which family and title survives today.

Thus the Beaufort family is today represented in the male line by its illegitimate continuation, the House of Somerset, whose senior representative is Henry Somerset, 12th Duke of Beaufort. The Somerset family has long borne the arms of Beaufort undifferenced, with the baton sinister adopted by Charles Somerset, 1st Earl of Worcester, discontinued.

== Notable Beauforts ==
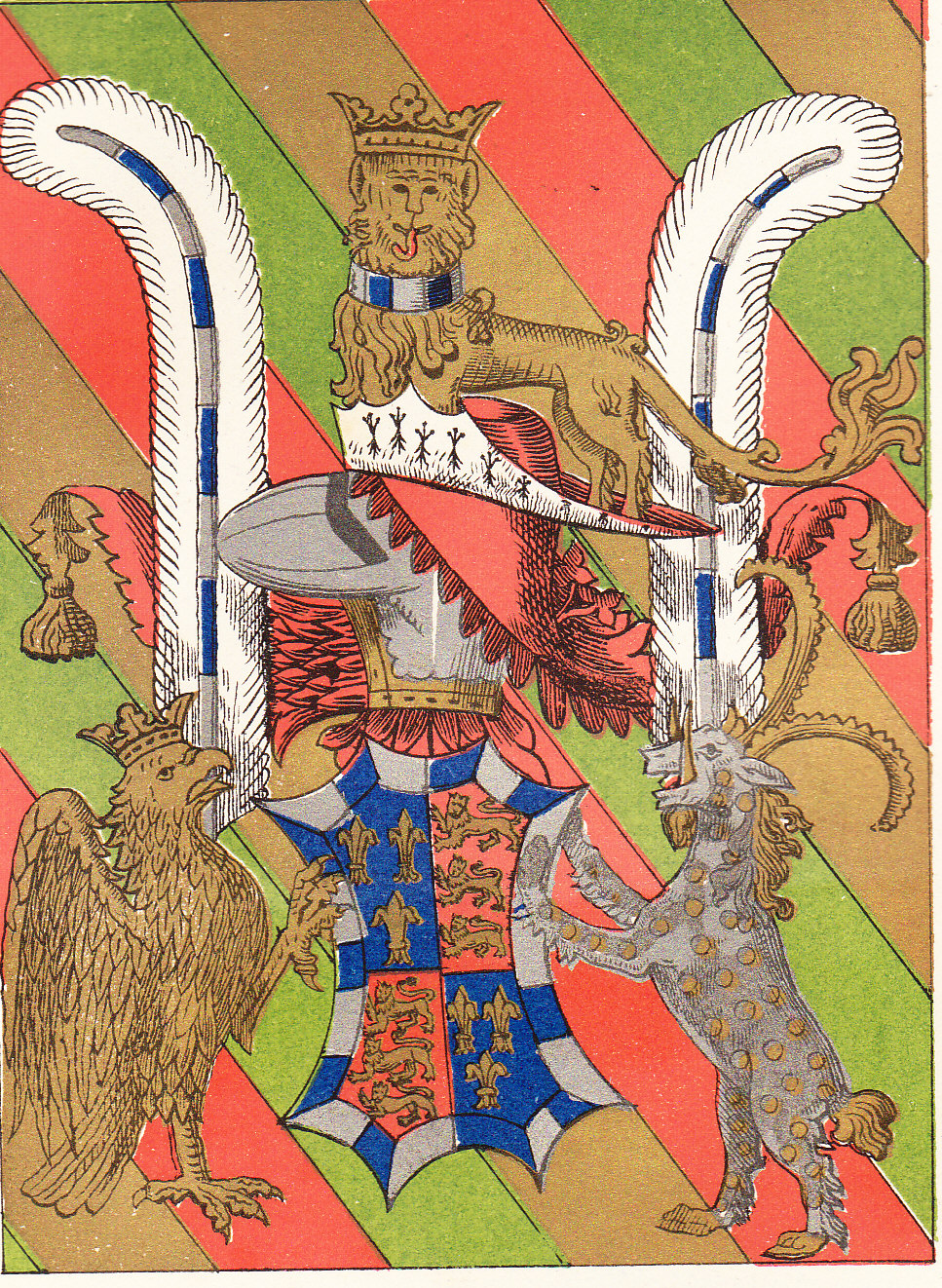
Heraldic achievement forming the Garter stall plate of John Beaufort, 1st Duke of Somerset (d.1444), KG, St. George's Chapel, Windsor. The earliest garter plate with supporters. It includes the badge of an ostrich feather, here shown as a pair, blazoned: feather argent pen componée argent and azure

These included:

- John Beaufort, 1st Earl of Somerset (c. 1371–1410).
  - Henry Beaufort, 2nd Earl of Somerset (c. 1401–1418).
  - John Beaufort, 1st Duke of Somerset (c. 1404–1444).
    - Margaret Beaufort, Countess of Richmond and Derby (1443–1509), mother of King Henry VII of England
  - Joan Beaufort, Queen of Scotland (c. 1404–1445)
  - Thomas Beaufort, Count of Perche (c. 1405–1431)
  - Edmund Beaufort, 2nd Duke of Somerset (c. 1406–1455).
    - Henry Beaufort, 3rd Duke of Somerset (1436–1464).
    - Margaret Beaufort, Countess of Stafford (c. 1427–1474)
    - Edmund Beaufort, 4th Duke of Somerset (c. 1438–1471).
    - John Beaufort, Marquess of Dorset (c. 1441–1471)
  - Margaret Beaufort, Countess of Devon (1409–1449)
- Henry Beaufort (c. 1375–1447), Cardinal Bishop of Winchester
- Thomas Beaufort, Duke of Exeter (c. 1377–1426)
- Joan Beaufort, Countess of Westmorland (c. 1379–1440)
  - Cecily Neville, Duchess of York (1415–1495), mother of Kings Edward IV and Richard III of England

== Family tree ==
Family tree

Blanche of Lancaster (1342–1368) | John of Gaunt, 1st Duke of Lancaster (1340–1399) duke of Lancaster | Catherine Swynford (1350–1403)
Henry IV (1367–1413) king of England | John Beaufort (1371–1410); Earl of Somerset x Margaret Holland | Henry Beaufort (1375–1447) bishop of Lincoln cardinal | Thomas Beaufort (1377–1426) duke of Exeter x Margaret Neville | Joan Beaufort (1379–1440) x Ralph Neville
House of Lancaster | Henry (1401 † 1418); Earl of Somerset | John (1403 † 1444) duke of Somerset x Margaret Beauchamp | Thomas (v.1405 † 1431); Earl of Perche | Joan (v.1404 † 1445) x James I of Scotland king of Scotland | Edmund (v.1406 † 1455) duke of Somerset x Eleanor Beauchamp | Margaret (v. 1409 † 1449) x Thomas de Courtenay; Earl of Devon | Henry died young
Margaret (1443 † 1509) x Edmund Tudor | Henry (1436 † 1464) duke of Somerset | Edmund (c. 1438 † 1471) duke of Somerset | John Beaufort, Marquess of Dorset († 1471) | daughters
King Henry VII (1457 † 1509); House of Tudor | illegitimate son Charles Somerset, 1st Earl of Worcester

== Coats of arms ==
| Arms | Name | Life | Blazon | Notes |
|---|---|---|---|---|
| | Henry Bolingbroke, Duke of Hereford and Lancaster (later King Henry IV) | 1366–1413 | As Duke of Hereford: Quarterly, 1st and 4th, France ancien, 2nd and 3rd England, with a label of five points ermine (Richmond) As Duke of Lancaster and Hereford: Quarterly, 1st and 4th, France ancien, 2nd and 3rd England, with a label of five points two of ermine (Richmond) and three Azure flory Or (Lancaster) | Son of: John of Gaunt, Duke of Lancaster and Blanche of Lancaster. |
| | John Beaufort, Earl of Somerset | 1373–1410 | Per pale, Argent and Azure, over all on a bend Gules three lions passant guardant Or with a label of three points Azure each charges with three fleur de lys Or Quarterly, 1st and 4th, France ancien, 2nd and 3rd England, within a bordure componée Argent and Azure | Illegitimate Son (legitimated in 1396) of: John of Gaunt, Duke of Lancaster and Katherine Swynford. See: House of Beaufort |
| | Henry Beaufort, Cardinal of St. Eusebius and Bishop of Winchester | 1374–1447 | Quarterly, 1st and 4th, France ancien, 2nd and 3rd England, within a bordure componée Argent and Azure | Illegitimate Son (legitimated in 1396) of: John of Gaunt, Duke of Lancaster and Katherine Swynford. |
| | Thomas Beaufort, Duke of Exeter | 1377–1426 | Quarterly, 1st and 4th, France ancien, 2nd and 3rd England, within a bordure componée Azure and Ermine | Illegitimate Son (legitimated in 1396) of: John of Gaunt, Duke of Lancaster and Katherine Swynford. |

| John Beaufort, 1st Earl of Somerset | Coat of Arms of Thomas Beaufort, Duke of Exeter | John Beaufort, 1st Duke of Somerset |

Colour key
(Line of descent)
Monarchs
Paternal descent
Maternal descent
Consorts
Illegitimate descent
Collaterals

=== Descendants of John Beaufort, 1st Earl of Somerset ===
| Arms | Name | Life | Blazon | Notes |
|---|---|---|---|---|
| | John Beaufort, Earl of Somerset | 1373–1410 | Per pale, Argent and Azure, over all on a bend Gules three lions passant guardant Or with a label of three points Azure each charges with three fleur de lys Or Quarterly, 1st and 4th, France ancien, 2nd and 3rd England, within a bordure componée Argent and Azure | Illegitimate Son (legitimated in 1396) of: John of Gaunt, Duke of Lancaster and Katherine Swynford. |
| | Margaret Holland, Countess of Somerset | 1385–1439 | Quarterly, 1st and 4th, France ancien, 2nd and 3rd England, within a bordure componée Argent and Azure, impaling, Gules, three lions passant guardant Or, within a bordure Argent | Daughter of: Thomas Holland, Earl of Kent and Alice Holland, Countess of Kent Married to: John Beaufort, Earl of Somerset; 1399–1410 Married to: Thomas of Lancaster, Duke of Clarence; 1411–1421 |

| Arms | Name | Life | Blazon | Notes |
|---|---|---|---|---|
| | John Beaufort, Duke of Somerset | 1403–1444 | Quarterly, 1st and 4th, France moderne, 2nd and 3rd England, within a bordure componée Argent and Azure | Son of: John Beaufort, Earl of Somerset and Margaret Holland. |
| | Margaret Beauchamp | 1406–1482 | Quarterly, 1st and 4th, France moderne, 2nd and 3rd England, within a bordure componée Argent and Azure, impaling, Gules, on a fess Or a mullet Sable, between six martlets, three, two and one, of the second (Beauchamp) | Daughter of: John Beauchamp of Bletso and Edith Stourton. Married to: Sir Oliver St John, of Bletsoe; 1425–1437. Married to: John Beaufort, Duke of Somerset; 1439–1444. Married to: Lionel de Welles, Baron Welles; 1447–1461. |

| Arms | Name | Life | Blazon | Notes |
|---|---|---|---|---|
| | Lady Margaret Beaufort | 1443–1509 | Quarterly, 1st and 4th, France moderne, 2nd and 3rd England, within a bordure componée Argent and Azure Quarterly, France moderne and England, a bordure Azure charged alternatively with fleurs de lys and martlets Or, impaling, Quarterly, 1st and 4th, France moderne, 2nd and 3rd England, within a bordure componée Argent and Azure | Daughter of: John Beaufort, Duke of Somerset and Margaret Beauchamp. Married to: Edmund Tudor, 1st Earl of Richmond; 1455–1456. Married to: Sir Henry Stafford; 1462–1471. Married to: Thomas Stanley, Earl of Derby; 1472–1504. |
| | Edmund Tudor, Earl of Richmond | 1430–1456 | Quarterly, France moderne and England, a bordure Azure charged alternatively with fleurs de lys and martlets Or | Son of: Sir Owen Tudor and Catherine of Valois. Half brother to King Henry VI, legitimated by Parliament in 1453. |

| Arms | Name | Life | Blazon | Notes |
|---|---|---|---|---|
| | Henry Tudor, Earl of Richmond (later King Henry VII) | 1457–1509 | Quarterly, France moderne and England, a bordure Azure charged alternatively with fleurs de lys and martlets Or Quarterly, 1st and 4th, France moderne, 2nd and 3rd England | Son of: Edmund Tudor, Earl of Richmond and Lady Margaret Beaufort. Defeats King Richard III at the Battle of Bosworth Field in 1485, claims the throne as King Henry VII. See: House of Tudor |
| | Elizabeth of York | 1466–1503 | Quarterly, 1st, quarterly, 1st and 4th, France moderne, 2nd and 3rd England, 2nd and 3rd de Burgh, 4th Mortimer | Daughter of: King Edward IV and Elizabeth Woodville. Married to: King Henry VII; 1486–1503. Heiress of the House of York. |

== Symbols of Beaufort ==
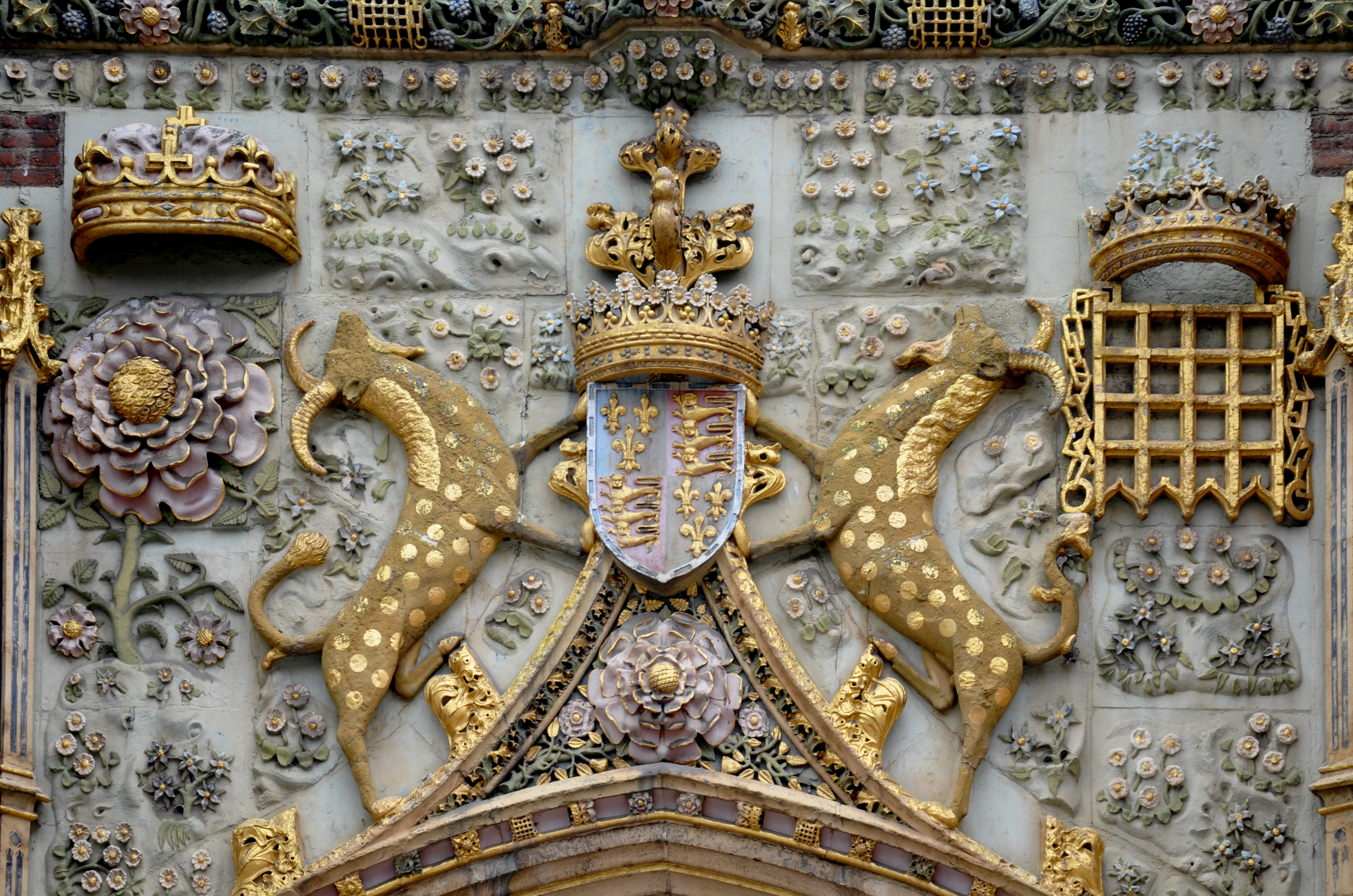
Main gate of St John's College, Cambridge, founded by Lady Margaret Beaufort, showing many symbols of the Beaufort family, including the colours white and blue componée, the Beaufort Yale, the Forget-me-Not flower, the Beaufort Portcullis and the Marguerite or daisy flower, a personal emblem of Lady Margaret Beaufort

The House of Beaufort adopted various heraldic or quasi-heraldic symbols, badges or cognisances. These included:

- The Beaufort Portcullis, now the symbol of Parliament;
- The heraldic colours white and blue, an old symbol of the Earls of Lancaster, shown componée;
- The Beaufort Yale, an heraldic beast used as supporters of the escutcheon;
- The Forget-me-Not flower (Myosotis sylvatica), a reference to the heraldic motto of Lady Margaret Beaufort Souvent me Souvient ("I often remember"). It is visible sculpted on the main gate of St John's College, Cambridge, founded by Lady Margaret Beaufort. The forget-me-not flower was possibly first used as the heraldic badge of King Henry IV, legitimate son and heir of John of Gaunt. One of Henry IV's mottos was souveyne vous de moi, the French name for the forget-me-not flower. Henry IV's accounts contain several references to this flower, for example "for mending a collar of the lord in the form of flowers of souveyne vous de moi … with a swan newly enamelled" and "for a collar of esses and flowers of souveyne vous de moys".
