= Alexander Buchanan (soldier) =

Sir Alexander Buchanan
- Died: 1424
- Occupation: Soldier

Sir Alexander Buchanan (died 1424) was the eldest of the three sons of Sir Walter Buchanan, eleventh Laird of Buchanan. He was noted for killing Thomas of Lancaster, Duke of Clarence, heir to the English throne, at the Battle of Baugé.

== Military career ==
Buchanan joined the Scottish army which was sent to France to aid the French against the English invasion of Henry V. After the Treaty of Troyes, resistance was led by the Dauphin Charles. When Henry returned to England with his new bride, he left his brother, the Duke of Clarence, in command.

At the Battle of Baugé on 22 March 1421, the Scottish army encountered the Duke's forces. Clarence rashly charged into the Scottish ranks. He and his knights were soon surrounded. During the battle, Sir John Carmichael of Douglasdale broke his lance, unhorsing the Duke of Clarence. Once on the ground, the Duke was slain by Sir Alexander, apparently with a mace. In other versions of the incident, Sir Alexander kills the Duke by piercing him with a lance.

Sir Alexander subsequently held the prince's coronet aloft on his lance, bringing such dismay to the English that the battle was lost to them. In recognition of this, the Clan Buchanan coat of arms to this day depicts a ducal coronet being held up in triumph.

Sir Alexander was killed three years later at the Battle of Verneuil, in which the Scottish army was all but destroyed. The English shouted "A Clarence! A Clarence!" during the attack, invoking the memory of the deceased Duke as a battle cry for revenge.

== Issue ==
Sir Alexander died without issue and his father, Sir Walter Buchanan, eleventh Laird of Buchanan, was succeeded by his second son, Sir Walter Buchanan, twelfth Laird of Buchanan.
