= Margaret Holland, Duchess of Clarence =

English noblewoman (1385–1439)

Margaret Holland
- Countess of Somerset; Duchess of Clarence
- Born: 1385
- Died: 30 December 1439 (aged 54); Bermondsey Abbey, London, England
- Burial: Canterbury Cathedral, Kent, England
- Spouse: John Beaufort, 1st Earl of Somerset (m. 1397; died 1410) Thomas of Lancaster, Duke of Clarence (m. 1411; died 1421)
- Issue: Henry Beaufort, 2nd Earl of Somerset; Joan Beaufort, Queen of Scots; John Beaufort, 1st Duke of Somerset; Thomas Beaufort, Count of Perche; Edmund Beaufort, 2nd Duke of Somerset; Margaret Beaufort, Countess of Devon
- Dynasty: Holland family
- Father: Thomas Holland, 2nd Earl of Kent
- Mother: Alice FitzAlan

Margaret Holland (1385 – 30 December 1439) was a medieval English noblewoman and a member of the powerful Holland family. Through her marriages, she became Countess of Somerset and Duchess of Clarence. She was "at the very centre of royal power and prestige" throughout her lifetime.

== Early life ==
Margaret was a daughter of Thomas Holland, 2nd Earl of Kent, who was the son of Joan "the Fair Maid of Kent" (granddaughter of Edward I of England, wife of Edward the Black Prince and mother of Richard II of England). Margaret's mother was Alice FitzAlan, daughter of Richard FitzAlan, 10th Earl of Arundel and Eleanor of Lancaster.

== Marriages and issue ==
Margaret married John Beaufort, 1st Earl of Somerset, son of John of Gaunt and his mistress Katherine Swynford. They had six children:

- Henry Beaufort, 2nd Earl of Somerset (1401–1418).
- Joan Beaufort (d. 1445), who married James I of Scotland and Sir James Stewart, the Black Knight of Lorn.
- John Beaufort, 1st Duke of Somerset (1404–1444), who married Margaret Beauchamp.
- Thomas Beaufort, Count of Perche (c. 1405–1431). Died at the Siege of Louviers.
- Edmund Beaufort, 2nd Duke of Somerset (c. 1406–1455) who married Eleanor Beauchamp, daughter of Richard de Beauchamp, 13th Earl of Warwick, by his first wife Elizabeth de Berkeley.
- Margaret Beaufort (c. 1408–1449), who married Thomas de Courtenay, 5th Earl of Devon.

In 1399, she was invested as a Lady of the Order of the Garter (LG).

After her husband John Beaufort died in 1410, she married his half-nephew Thomas of Lancaster, Duke of Clarence (1387–1421), the son of King Henry IV. They had no children, although Thomas was stepfather to her six children from her first marriage, who were his first cousins.

== Later life and death ==
In 1419 she travelled to Normandy with her sons to be with her husband there, leaving her daughters in the care of the Prioress of Dartford. Her husband died on 22 March 1421 fighting at the Battle of Baugé, Anjou, France. She was an executrix of his will alongside executors John Colvylle of Neuton, Cambridgeshire, knight, and Henry Merston of Westminster, clerk.

In 1430 a book about the life of St. Jerome was made for her by Symon Wynter of Syon Abbey.

Margaret retired to St. Saviour's Abbey, Bermondsey, London, where she died on 30 December 1439.

Margaret and both her husbands are buried together in a carved alabaster tomb in Canterbury Cathedral that she commissioned. The monument shows her lying in repose between her two husbands, which is extremely rare. Her husbands had been buried in the Trinity Chapel and were exhumed to be reburied alongside Margaret.

== Descendants ==
Through her son John, the 1st Duke of Somerset, and his wife Margaret Beauchamp, Lady Margaret is an ancestress to the Tudor monarchs.

== Ancestry ==
Ancestors of Margaret Holland, Duchess of Clarence

8. Robert de Holland, 1st Baron Holand
4. Thomas Holland, 1st Earl of Kent
9. Maud la Zouche
2. Thomas Holland, 2nd Earl of Kent
10. Edmund of Woodstock, 1st Earl of Kent
5. Joan, 4th Countess of Kent
11. Margaret Wake, 3rd Baroness Wake of Liddell
1. Margaret Holland
12. Edmund FitzAlan, 9th Earl of Arundel
6. Richard FitzAlan, 10th Earl of Arundel
13. Alice de Warenne
3. Alice FitzAlan
14. Henry, 3rd Earl of Lancaster
7. Eleanor of Lancaster
15. Maud Chaworth
