= Henry Cunningham (knight) =

15th-century Scottish noble

Henry Cunningham, was a Scottish noble who took part in the Hundred Years War. He captured Walter, Baron FitzWalter, during the battle of Baugé in 1421 in France.

== Life ==
Henry was the third son of William Cunningham of Kilmaurs and Margaret Danielston. As part of the Scottish division of the French army during the battle of Baugé on 22 March 1421, he captured Walter, Baron FitzWalter.
