= Gilbert V de Umfraville =

English noble (1390–1421)

Arms of Umfraville of Harbottle: Gules semée of cross-crosslets or, a cinquefoil of the second.

Gilbert V de Umfraville (July 1390 – 22 March 1421), popularly styled the "Earl of Kyme", was an English noble who took part in the Hundred Years War. He was killed during the Battle of Baugé in 1421 fighting a Franco-Scots army.

== Life ==
Gilbert was born at the end of July 1390, the only son of Thomas II de Umfraville of Harbottle and Agnes Grey. He succeeded his father on 12 February 1391, as a minor of only twenty-eight weeks old. He married Anne, daughter of Ralph Neville, 1st Earl of Westmorland, and his wife Margaret, daughter of Hugh Stafford, 2nd Earl of Stafford in 1413. On the 3rd of december 1409, he fought against Georges de La Trémoille during a joust in Lille in honor of the duke of Burgundy John the Fearless. He died fighting the French at the Battle of Baugé on 22 March 1421. He did not have any issue and the family estates were partitioned between his five sisters and their husbands. (Note: His sisters were; Elizabeth, the wife of William Elmede; Matilda, the wife of William Rither; Johanna, the wife of Thomas Lambert; Margaret the wife of John Constable and Agnes, the wife of Thomas Hagirston) His uncle Robert de Umfraville, inherited the Redesdale and Kyme estates.

== See also ==
- Umfraville
