= Thomas of Lancaster, Duke of Clarence =

English prince and soldier (1387–1421)

Thomas of Lancaster
- Duke of Clarence
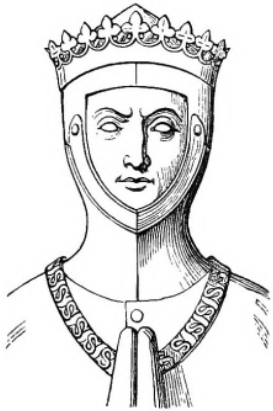
- Drawing of his tomb effigy
- Born: Autumn 1387; Probably Palace of Westminster or Tower of London
- Died: 22 March 1421 (aged 33); Battle of Baugé, Anjou, France
- Burial: Canterbury Cathedral, Kent
- Spouse: Margaret Holland (m. 1411)
- Issue: John of Clarence (illegitimate)
- House: Lancaster
- Father: Henry IV of England
- Mother: Mary de Bohun

Thomas of Lancaster, Duke of Clarence (c. autumn 1387 – 22 March 1421) was a medieval English prince and soldier, the second son of Henry IV of England, brother of Henry V, and heir to the throne in the event of his brother's death. He acted as counselor and aide to both.

His father appointed him Lord Lieutenant of Ireland in 1401. Thomas, who was only fourteen, landed in Dublin in November 1401 and spent much of the next eight years in Ireland. He was nearly killed in a skirmish near Dublin in 1406.

After his father's death, he participated in his brother's military campaigns in France during the Hundred Years' War. Left in charge of English forces in France when Henry returned temporarily to England after his marriage to Catherine of Valois, Thomas led the English in their disastrous defeat at the hands of a mainly Scottish force that came to the aid of the French at the Battle of Baugé. In a rash attack, he and his leading knights were surrounded, and Thomas was killed at the age of 33.

== Origins ==
Thomas was born before 25 November 1387 as on that date his father's accounts note a payment made to a woman described as his nurse. 29 September 1388 sometimes features as his birth date, but it now seems clear that Thomas was born before Christmas 1387. He was probably born in London, but some sources give Kenilworth Castle.

== Marriage ==
In November or December 1411, Thomas married Margaret Holland, widow of his uncle John Beaufort, 1st Earl of Somerset, and daughter of Thomas Holland, 2nd Earl of Kent. No children were born from this union, although Thomas was stepfather to her six children from her first marriage, who were his first cousins. He had, however, a natural son, Sir John Clarence, called "Bastard of Clarence" who fought by his father's side in France.

== Career ==
After Thomas's father became ill in 1411, his older brother Henry became head of the royal council. Conflicts arose between the young Henry and his father when the prince gathered a group of supporters favouring his policy of declaring war on France. The prince was removed from the council by his father after he had defied the king's wishes by persuading it to declare war. Thomas was given his brother's seat, and fell in line with his father's peace policy. Though he remained Lord Lieutenant of Ireland until 1413, he did not return to Ireland after 1409. He seems to have been a conscientious Governor there, but was hampered in his efforts to keep the peace by the chronic shortage of money in Ireland.

=== Military career ===
On 8 June 1412, Henry IV appointed Thomas to command a force of 1,000 men-at-arms and 3,000 longbowmen promised to the Armagnac lords, with Edward of Rutland, Duke of York, and Thomas Beaufort, Admiral of England, serving as his deputies. On 9 July, while the army was assembling at Southampton, the king created Thomas Duke of Clarence, a title previously held by Lionel of Antwerp. Two days later, he appointed Clarence his lieutenant in Aquitaine.

Clarence and his army sailed from England in the first week of August 1412. Before their arrival, John of Burgundy had decided to make peace with the Armagnac lords, and on 22 July they informed Henry IV that they would be unable to fulfil their agreement because King Charles had forbidden it. Nevertheless, Clarence continued. Advancing south towards the Loire, the English army conducted a campaign of raiding and destruction. Clarence refused to recognise the letters addressed to his father and brother and insisted on the payment promised to his army. Unable to resist the English advance, the Armagnac lords entered negotiations. On 14 November, at Buzançais, Clarence reached an agreement with the Dukes of Berry, Bourbon, and Orléans under which the English army would leave France by 1 January 1413 in return for £40,000. As security until the payment was made, the French lords provided hostages, including John, Count of Angoulême, the thirteen-year-old brother of the Duke of Orléans, as well as valuable items from the Duke of Berry's treasury, including a jewelled gold cross said to contain a nail from the Crucifixion.

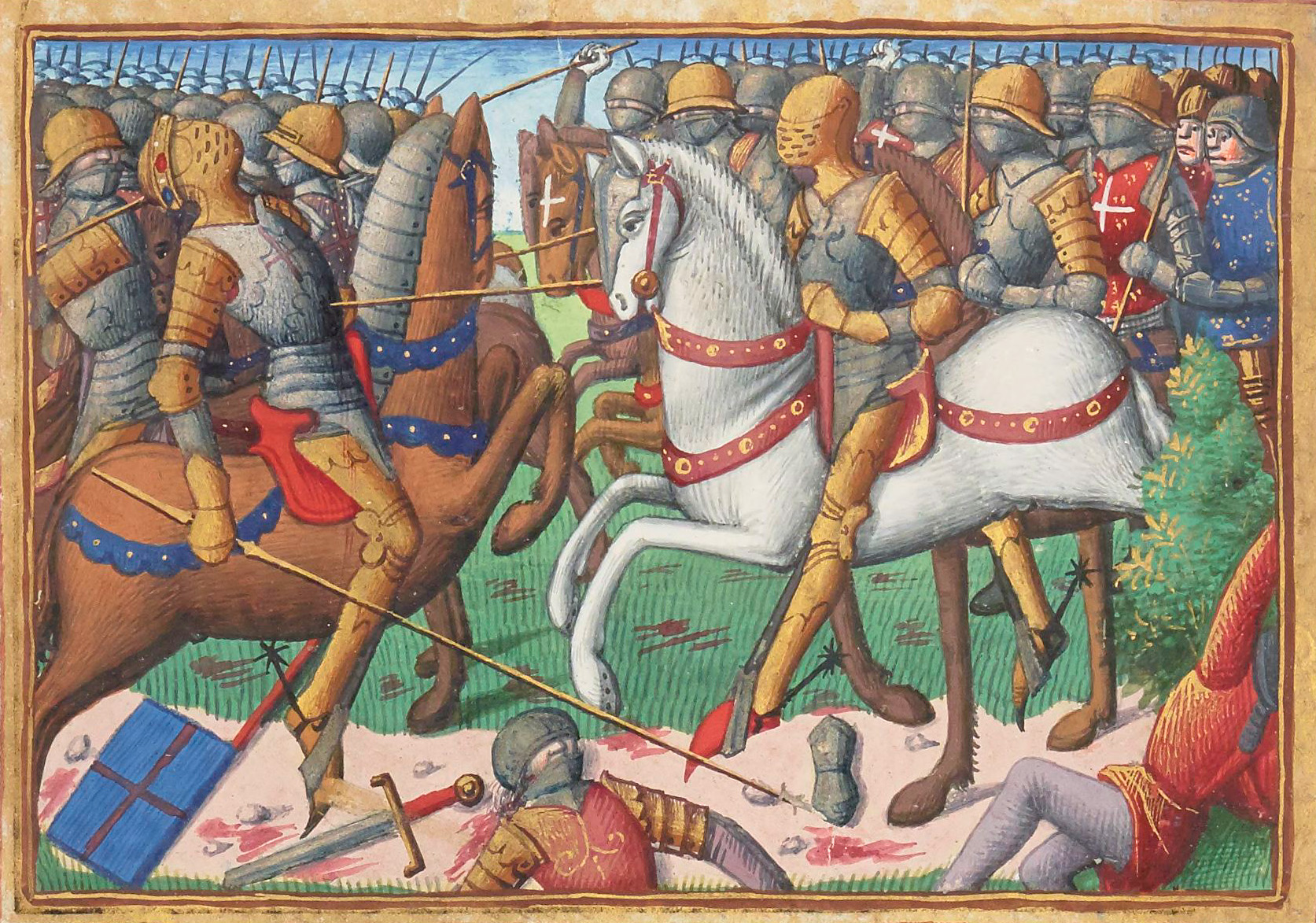
The Battle of Baugé, from Les Vigiles de Charles VII

During the wars of his elder brother Henry V in France, Clarence fought in both the Siege of Caen and the Siege of Rouen (29 July 1418 – 19 January 1419), where he commanded the besieging force. After Henry had negotiated the Treaty of Troyes, in which he became heir to the French throne, the king returned to England with his new wife Catherine. The Dauphin, the disinherited former heir, refused to accept the situation and organised continuing resistance, aided by a Scottish army led by John Stewart, Earl of Buchan.

Following the king's instructions, Clarence led 4,000 men in raids through Anjou and Maine. This chevauchée met with little resistance, and by Good Friday, 21 March 1421, the English army had made camp near the little town of Vieil-Baugé. The Franco-Scots army of about 5,000 also arrived in the Vieil-Baugé area to block the English army's progress; it was commanded by the Earl of Buchan and the Marshal of France, the Sieur de Lafayette; however, the English forces were dispersed, and, significantly, many of the English archers had ridden off in search of plunder or forage. On Easter Saturday, one of these foraging groups captured a Scots man-at-arms whom they brought before the Duke of Clarence. Clarence was keen to engage the enemy; however, he had a problem: the following day was Easter Sunday, one of the holiest days in the Christian calendar, when a battle would be unthinkable. A two-day delay was also deemed as out of the question. According to the chronicles of Walter Bower, both commanders agreed a brief truce to celebrate Easter, but then joined battle that day.

Perhaps underestimating the size of the Franco-Scottish army, Clarence decided to launch a surprise cavalry-led attack rather than use his archers against the enemy. With only about 1,500 men-at-arms available, and virtually no archers, he charged the Franco-Scottish lines. The shock temporarily disordered the Franco-Scots, but soon Clarence and his knights were overwhelmed. Clarence was unhorsed by a Scottish knight, Sir John Carmichael of Douglasdale, and finished off on the ground by Sir Alexander Buchanan, probably with a mace, "his jewelled and crowned helmet wrenched from his head as a prize".

== Burial ==
Clarence's natural son John accompanied the remains of his father from Baugé to Canterbury for their interment. This Sir John Clarence had a grant of lands in Ireland from Henry V and was buried in Canterbury Cathedral.

Clarence's executors, as seen in a legal record of 1430, were John Colvylle, of Neuton, Cambridgeshire, knight; Henry Merston, of Westminster, clerk and his widow, Margaret, Duchess of Clarence, living in Bermondsey, Surrey.

== Titles, honours and arms ==
Arms of Thomas of Lancaster, 1st Duke of Clarence: Arms of King Henry IV a label of three points argent each charged with three ermine spots and a canton gules (or possibly just differenced by a label of three points ermine)

=== Titles ===
- Duke of Clarence and Earl of Aumale (9 July 1412 – 22 March 1421); extinct upon his death

=== Honours ===
- Knight, Order of the Bath (12 October 1399 – 22 March 1421)
- Knight, Order of the Garter (1400 – 22 March 1421)

==== Offices held ====
- Lord High Steward of England (1399–1421) — he was the last permanent holder of this office, the highest in medieval England.
- Chief Governor of Ireland (1401–1413)
- Lord High Admiral (1405–1406)
- Lieutenant of Aquitaine (1412–1413)
- Lord High Steward of Chester (1415)
- Constable of the Army (1417)
- Lieutenant-General of the Army in France and Normandy (1417 and 1421)

== Notes ==
Thomas of Lancaster, Duke of Clarence House of Lancaster Cadet branch of the House of Plantagenet Born: 1387 Died: 22 March 1421
Political offices
Preceded by The Duke of Lancaster	Lord High Steward; 1399–1421	End of permanent office
