= Henry Beaufort, 2nd Earl of Somerset =

English nobleman

Henry Beaufort
- Earl of Somerset
- Arms of Beaufort: Royal arms of King Edward III with a bordure compony argent and azure for difference
- Predecessor: John Beaufort, 1st Earl of Somerset (father)
- Successor: John Beaufort, 1st Duke of Somerset, 3rd Earl of Somerset
- Born: 26 November 1401 (probable)
- Died: 25 November 1418 (aged 16); Rouen, France
- Family: House of Beaufort
- Father: John Beaufort, 1st Earl of Somerset
- Mother: Margaret Holland

Henry Beaufort, 2nd Earl of Somerset (probably 26 November 1401 – 25 November 1418) was an English nobleman who died aged possibly 16 at the Siege of Rouen in France during the Hundred Years' War, fighting for the Lancastrian cause. As he died unmarried without issue, his younger brother, John Beaufort, became his heir and the 3rd Earl of Somerset.

== Origins ==
He was the eldest son and heir of John Beaufort, 1st Earl of Somerset (1371-1410), the eldest of the four legitimised sons of John of Gaunt, 1st Duke of Lancaster (a younger son of King Edward III) by his mistress Katherine Swynford. His mother was Margaret Holland (1385-1439), a daughter of Thomas Holland, 2nd Earl of Kent, the son of Joan "the Fair Maid of Kent", a grand-daughter of King Edward I and wife of Edward the Black Prince (eldest brother of John of Gaunt) and mother of King Richard II

== Career ==
Henry succeeded his father as Earl of Somerset on 16 March 1410. During his minority his mother held his lands for him until he reached the age of 15.

== Death and succession ==
He died aged possibly sixteen at the Siege of Rouen during the Hundred Years' War, where he fought under the command of his uncle Thomas Beaufort, Duke of Exeter. He died unmarried and was succeeded by his younger brother John Beaufort, 1st Duke of Somerset, 3rd Earl of Somerset (1404-1444).

Peerage of England
| Preceded by John Beaufort | Earl of Somerset; 2nd creation 1410–1418 | Succeeded by John Beaufort |
