= Château de Montreuil-Bonnin =

French castle

Coordinates: 46.5509°N 0.1411°E

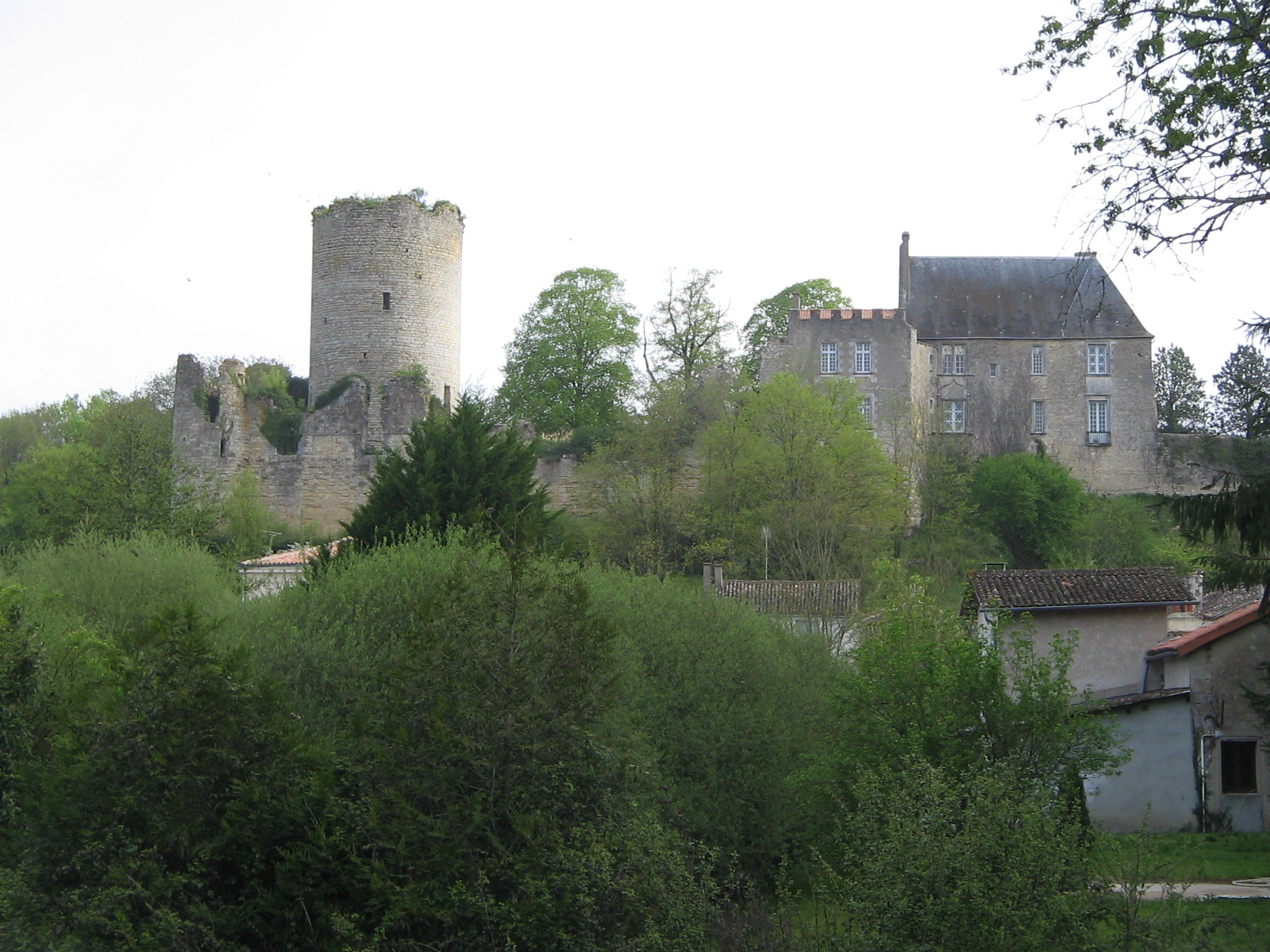

The Château de Montreuil-Bonnin is a castle located in Montreuil-Bonnin, department of Vienne, in the Nouvelle-Aquitaine region of France.

== History ==
The castle is recorded early in the 11th century, as a possession of the Count of Poitou.
