= Battle of Baugé =

1421 battle of the Hundred Years' War

- Part of the Hundred Years' War
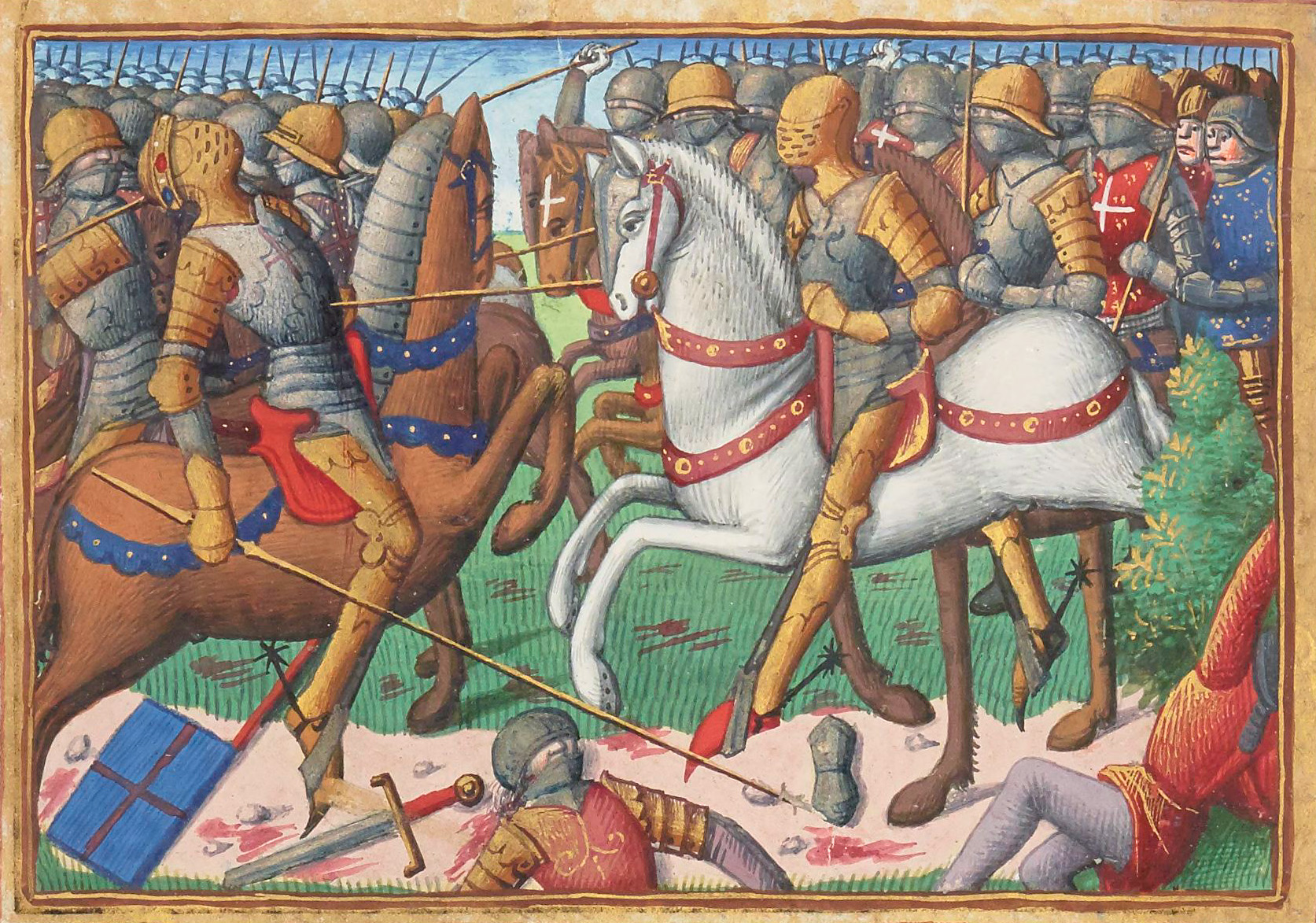
- The Battle of Baugé, illustration from the manuscript of Martial d'Auvergne, Les Vigiles de Charles VII, c. 1484.
Date	22 March 1421
Location	Baugé, France 47.541°N 0.105°W
Result	Franco–Scottish victory

Belligerents
Kingdom of France; Kingdom of Scotland	Kingdom of England

Commanders and leaders
Gilbert Motier de La Fayette; John Stewart, Earl of Buchan; Archibald Douglas, Earl of Wigton	Thomas, Duke of Clarence †; Thomas Montagu, Earl of Salisbury; Gilbert de Umfraville †; John, Baron Ros †

Strength
5,000 men	4,000 men (although only 1,500 men directly took part in the battle)

Casualties and losses
Very light	1,000 dead 500 captured

The Battle of Baugé, fought between the English and a Franco-Scots army on 22 March 1421 at Baugé, France, east of Angers, was a major defeat for the English in the Hundred Years' War. The Franco-Scots, 5,000 strong, were led by both John Stewart, Earl of Buchan, and Gilbert Motier de La Fayette, the Marshal of France, while the 4,000 strong English army (of which only 1,500 were deployed) was led by the King's brother Thomas, Duke of Clarence, who was killed in the action.

== Background ==
In 1415 Henry V, with the intention of resuming the war, sailed from England to France with a force of about 10,500. He then pursued a highly successful military campaign, including the decisive victory at the Battle of Agincourt. Thus he regained from the French crown much of England's previously held lands in France, and got the upper hand in French politics, so much so that the 1420 Treaty of Troyes would make him the next king of France.

In 1419 France was in a state of an ongoing civil war between the Royalist faction and the supporters of the dukes of Burgundy. The situation for the former was desperate, having lost Normandy to the English and Paris to the Burgundians. In these deteriorating circumstances Charles VII, the Dauphin at the time, appealed to the Scots for help, as the Scots had been in an alliance with France since 1295.. A Scottish army was assembled under the leadership of John, Earl of Buchan, and Archibald, Earl of Wigtown, and from late 1419 to 1421 the Scottish army became the mainstay of the Dauphin's defence of the lower Loire valley.

When Henry returned to England in 1421, he left his trusted brother and heir presumptive, Thomas, Duke of Clarence, in charge of the remaining army. Following the King's instructions, the Duke of Clarence led 4,000 men in raids through the provinces of Anjou and Maine. This chevauchée met with little resistance, and by Good Friday, 21 March, the English army had made camp near the little town of Vieil-Baugé. The Franco-Scots army of about 5,000 also arrived in the Vieil-Baugé area to block the English army's progress. It was commanded by the Earl of Buchan and the new Marshal of France, the Seigneur of La Fayette; however, the English forces were dispersed, and, significantly, many of the English archers had ridden off in search of plunder or forage. On Easter Saturday, one of these foraging groups captured a Scots man-at-arms who was able to provide the Duke of Clarence with intelligence on the 5,000 strong Scottish army. Clarence was keen to engage the enemy; however, he had a problem: the following day was Easter Sunday, one of the most holy days in the Christian calendar, when a battle would be unthinkable. A two-day delay was also deemed as out of the question. According to the chronicles of Walter Bower both commanders agreed to a short truce for Easter.

== Battle ==
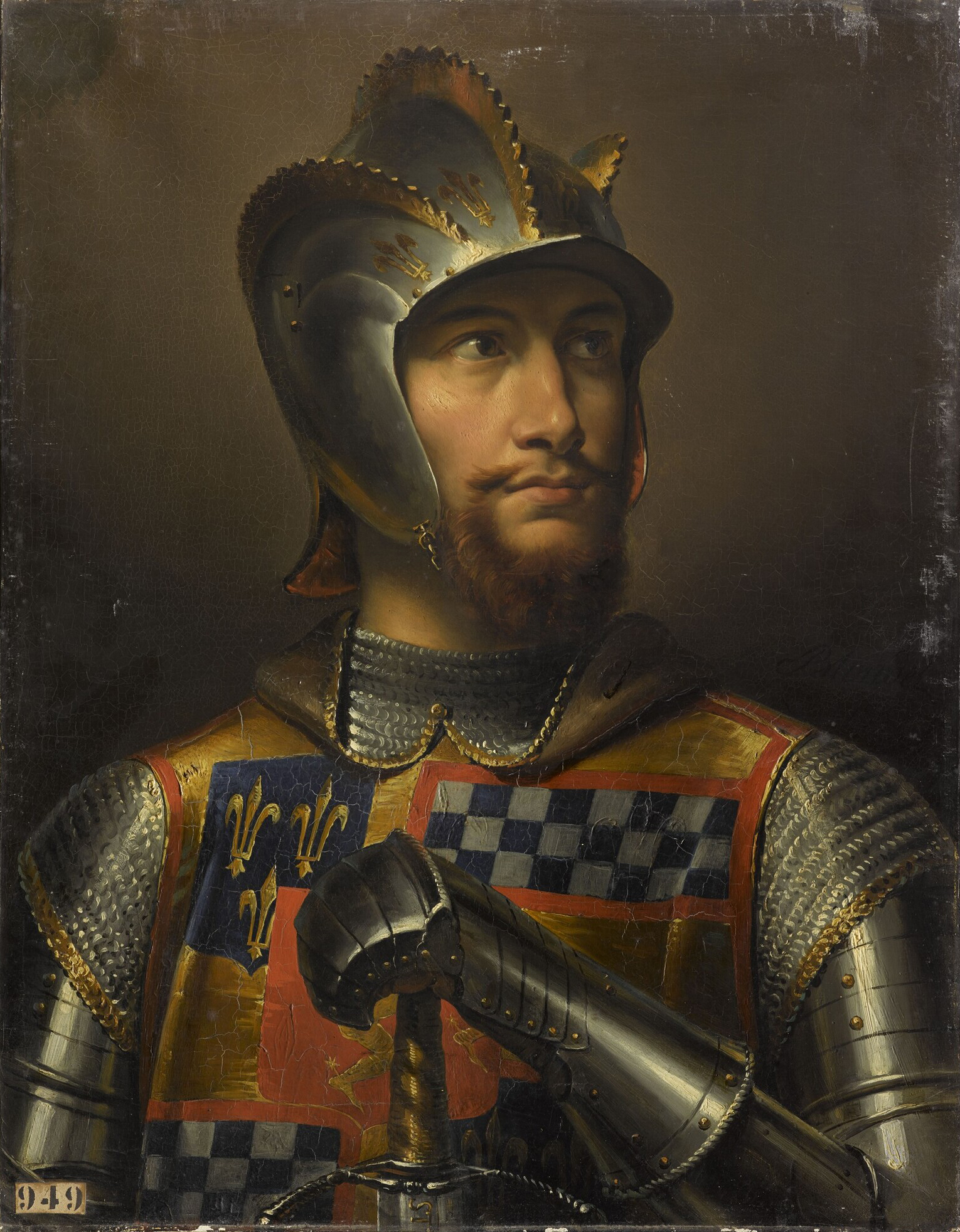
John Stewart, 2nd Earl of Buchan, leader of the Scottish forces at Baugé.

There are several accounts of the Battle of Baugé; they may vary in the detail; however, most agree that the principal factor in the Franco-Scottish victory was the rashness of the Duke of Clarence. It seems that the Duke of Clarence did not realise how big the Franco-Scottish army was as he decided to rely on the element of surprise and attack immediately. He discounted the advice of his lieutenants, the Earl of Huntingdon and Gilbert Umfraville, to consolidate his own force and position; instead he ordered the Earl of Salisbury to round up all the archers and follow him as soon as possible. Clarence then with only about 1500 men-at-arms available, and virtually no archers, charged the Franco-Scottish lines. The Scots rallied hastily, and battle was joined at a bridge which Clarence attempted to cross. A hundred Scottish archers, under Sir Robert Stewart of Ralston, reinforced by the retinue of Hugh Kennedy, held the bridge and prevented passage long enough for the Earl of Buchan to rally the rest of his army.

When Clarence finally forced his way across, he was confronted with the main body of the Franco-Scottish army; its men-at-arms were dismounted and were well defended by the Scottish archers. In the ensuing melée, John Carmichael of Douglasdale broke his lance unhorsing the Duke of Clarence. There are several versions of how Clarence met his death, but, according to Bower, the Scottish knight Sir John Swinton wounded the prince in his face, but it was Alexander Buchanan who is credited with killing the Duke with his mace and holding the dead Duke's coronet aloft on his lance in triumph. Another version stated that a Highland Scot, Alexander Macausland of Lennox, was responsible for Clarence's demise, whereas the Burgundian chronicler Georges Chastellain has the Duke killed by a Frenchman.

Later on in the day, probably in the evening, decisive action was taken by Salisbury, who, having succeeded in rounding up the English archers, used a contingent of them to rescue what was left of the English force and retrieve some of the bodies of the fallen, including that of Clarence.

== Aftermath ==
However, the Scots allowed the remnant of the English army, led by Salisbury, to escape and so missed an opportunity to remove the English from France. Nevertheless, the battle did secure the reputation of the Scottish army in France. On hearing of the Scottish victory, Pope Martin V passed comment by reiterating a common medieval saying, that "Verily the Scots are the antidote of the English."

The Dauphin was able to exploit the victory at Baugé by announcing his intention to invade English-held Normandy. He made Archibald Douglas, Earl of Wigtown, the Count of Longueville and Lord of Dun-le-Roi. Sir John Stewart of Darnley received the lands of Aubigny-sur-Nere and Concressault, whilst the Earl of Buchan was made Constable of France. In 1422 the Dauphin created the "hundred men-at-arms of the King's bodyguard", known as the "Hundred Lances of France", to supplement the 24 archers of the Garde Ecossaise. The Hundred Lances eventually became the company known as the Gendarmerie of France, who distinguished themselves at Fontenoy in 1745. John Carmichael was elected bishop of Orléans in 1426, and was one of the 6 bishops to attend the coronation of the Dauphin as Charles VII in 1429 at Rheims. Hugh Kennedy of Ardstinchar, Joan of Arc’s Scottish Captain and known to the French as Canede, was granted the right to quarter his coat of arms with the fleur-de-lis of France.

Meanwhile, Henry V had been busy in England with his wife Catherine of Valois. Catherine had been crowned at Westminster in late February. Soon after the queen's coronation, Henry and Catherine had set out on separate tours of England. It was while Henry was in the north of England he was informed of the disaster at Baugé and the death of his brother. He is said, by contemporaries, to have borne the news manfully. Henry returned to France with an army of 4000–5000 men. He arrived in Calais on 10 June, before going on to Paris (which was occupied by the England-friendly Burgundian forces under Philip the Good); he then visited Chartres and Gâtinais before returning to Paris. Several key southern towns were still loyal to the Dauphinist forces, leading Henry to decide to remove them as a factor for good. After taking the first town, he moved to lay siege to the strongly fortified Dauphin-held town of Meaux. It turned out to be more difficult to overcome than first thought. The siege began about 6 October, and the town held for seven months before finally falling on 11 May 1422. Whilst on his campaign in France, Henry fell ill and soon died (probably of dysentery) on 31 August 1422.

England's war in France continued under the Duke of Bedford's generalship, and the English won several battles including a decisive victory at the Battle of Verneuil (17 August 1424). At the battle of Baugé, Clarence had attacked the Franco-Scots army without the support of his archers. At Verneuil the English archers, although initially routed by a Milanese cavalry charge, later rallied and fought to devastating effect. The result of the battle was to virtually destroy the Dauphin's field army. By that time James I, who had returned to Scotland, was reluctant to send more relief to the French, and Scottish expeditions in aid of France were no longer a factor in the war.

== Notable casualties and captives ==
=== English deaths ===
- Thomas of Lancaster, 1st Duke of Clarence †
- John Grey, 1st Earl of Tankerville †
- John de Ros, 7th Baron de Ros †
- William de Ros †
- Gilbert V de Umfraville †

=== English captives ===
- John Beaufort, Earl of Somerset captured by Laurence Vernon
- Thomas Beaufort, Duke of Exeter, captured by Tanneguy du Châtel.
- John Holland, Earl of Huntingdon captured by Sir John Sibbald of Balgonie
- Thomas Beaufort captured by Sir John Stewart of Darnley
- Walter FitzWalter, 7th Baron FitzWalter captured by Henry Cunningham

=== French deaths ===
- Charles le Bouteiller
- Guérin de Fontaine

== See also ==
- Auld Alliance
