= John Beaufort, 1st Earl of Somerset =

English nobleman and politician (c. 1373–1410)

John Beaufort
- Earl of Somerset
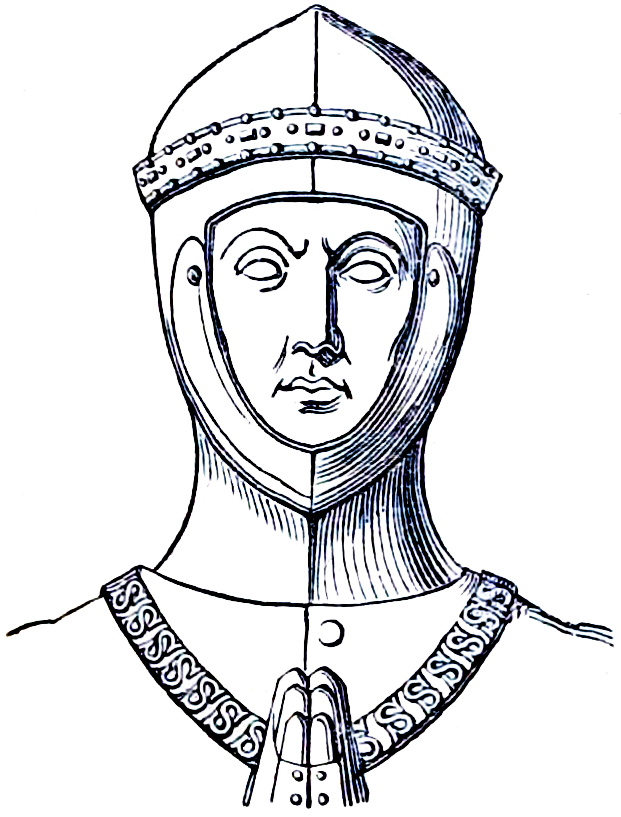
- Drawing of an alabaster tomb effigy of John Beaufort, wearing a Collar of Esses and plate armour, Canterbury Cathedral
- Born: c. 1373
- Died: 16 March 1410 (aged ~37); Hospital of St Katharine's by the Tower, London, England
- Burial: St Michael's Chapel, Canterbury Cathedral
- Spouse: Margaret Holland (m. 1397)
- Issue Detail: Henry, 2nd Earl of Somerset; Joan, Queen of Scots; John, Duke of Somerset; Thomas, Count of Perche; Edmund, Duke of Somerset; Margaret, Countess of Devon
- House: Beaufort (founder)
- Father: John of Gaunt
- Mother: Katherine Swynford

John Beaufort, 1st Earl of Somerset (c. 1373 – 16 March 1410), known as the Marquess of Somerset and Marquess of Dorset from 1397 to 1399, was an English-French nobleman and politician. Beaufort was the second son of John of Gaunt (1340–1399; third surviving son of King Edward III), eldest of the four children by his mistress Katherine Swynford, whom he later married in 1396.

The Beaufort children were declared legitimate twice by parliament, first during the reign of King Richard II, in 1397, which was confirmed by Henry IV, as well as by Pope Boniface IX in September 1396.

== Early life ==
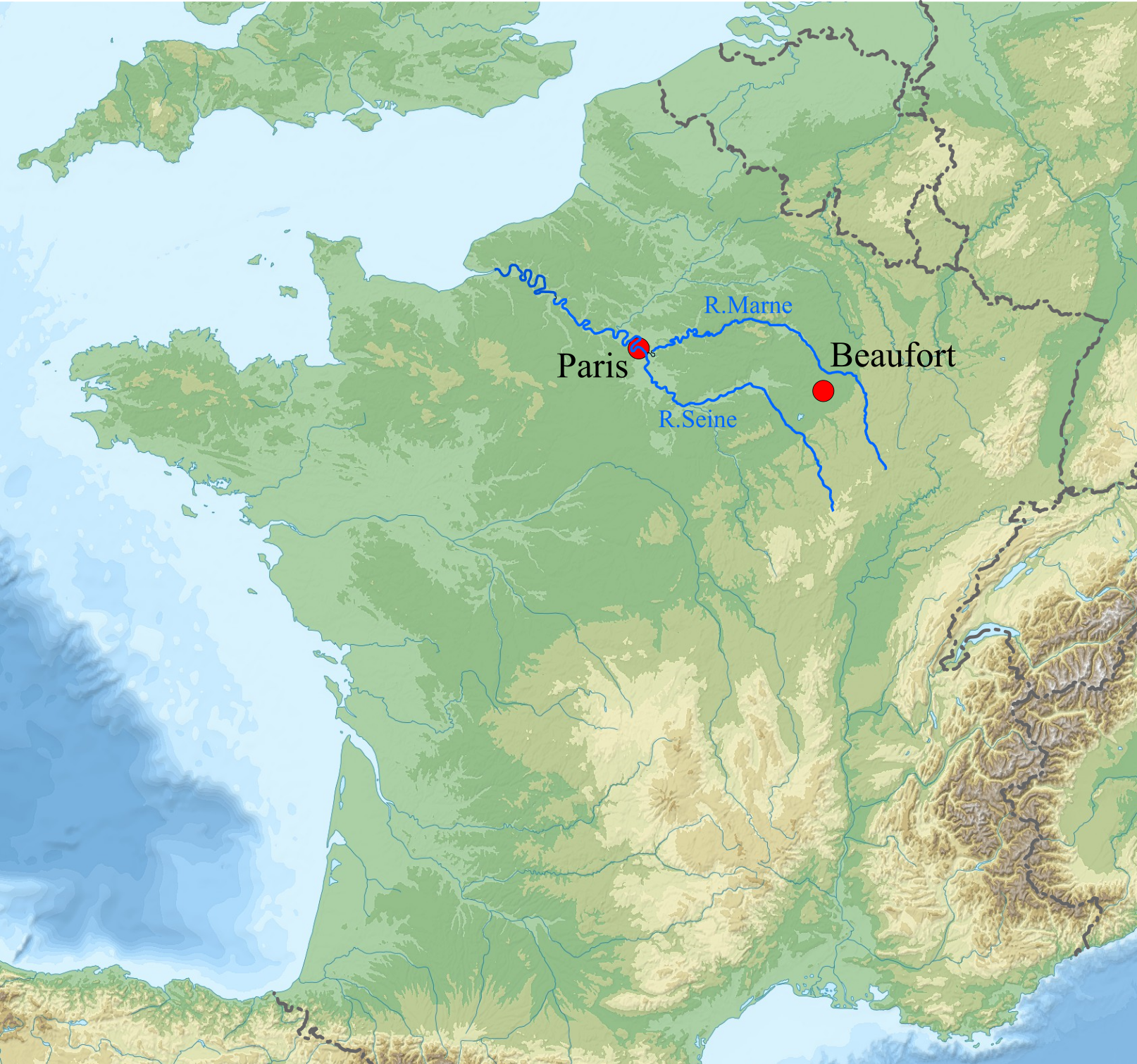
Map showing location of the Castle of Beaufort in the Champagne region of France, probable birthplace of John Beaufort, 1st Earl of Somerset

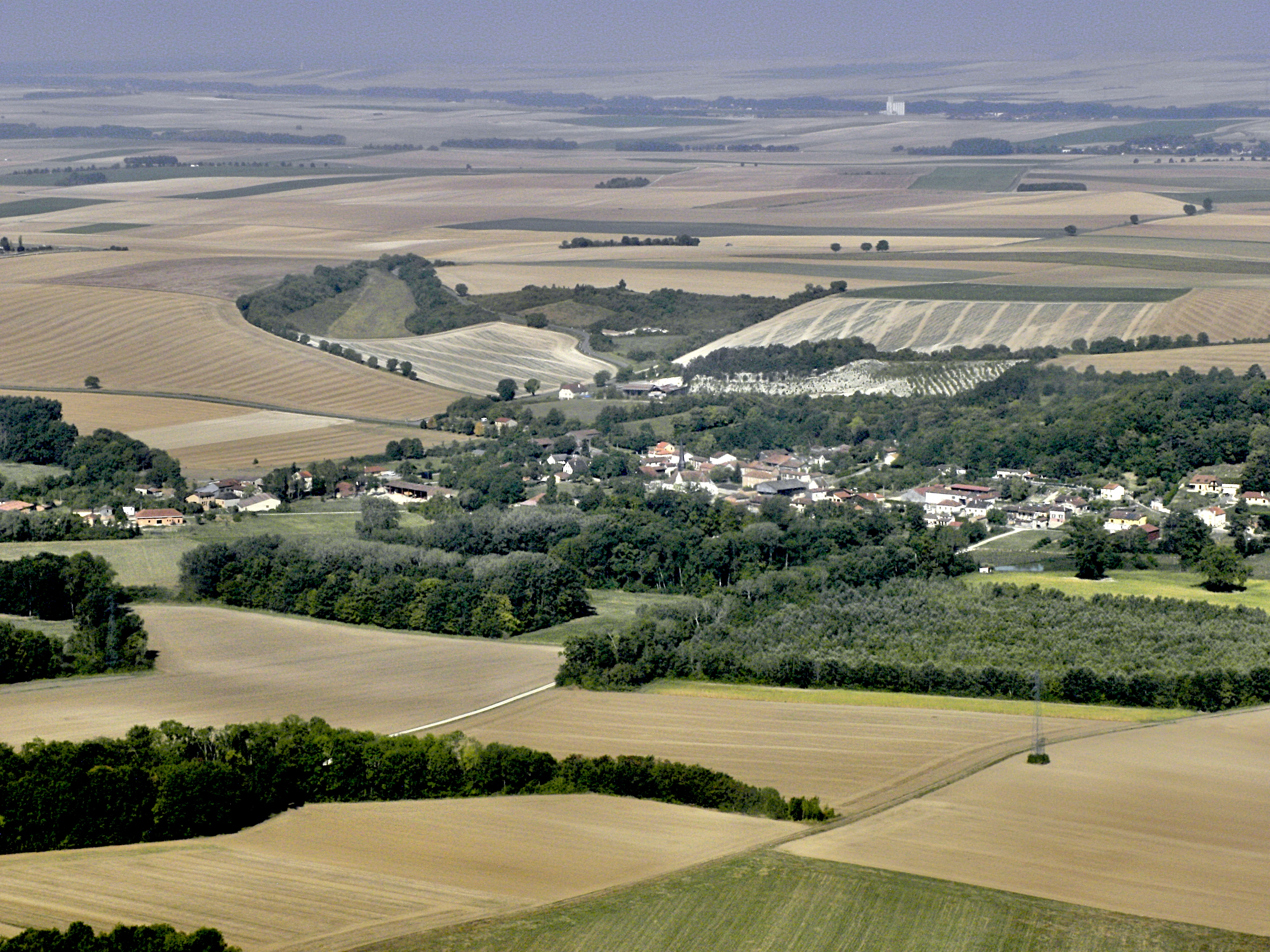
Flat countryside surrounding the site of the now-demolished Beaufort Castle, Champagne

Beaufort's surname (properly de Beaufort, "from Beaufort") probably reflects his birthplace at his father's castle and manor of Beaufort ("beautiful stronghold") in Champagne, France. The Portcullis heraldic badge of the Beauforts, now the emblem of the House of Commons, is believed to have been based on that of the castle of Beaufort, now demolished. Between May and September 1390, Beaufort saw military service in North Africa in the Barbary Crusade led by Louis II, Duke of Bourbon. In 1394, he was in Lithuania serving with the Teutonic Knights.

Heraldic badge of the House of Beaufort: A portcullis chained or, believed to represent the portcullis defending the gate of Castle Beaufort in Champagne, birthplace of John Beaufort 1st Earl of Somerset. Today it continues to be used as the badge of two officers of the College of Arms in London, namely the Somerset Herald and the Portcullis Pursuivant, is the symbol of the British House of Commons and has appeared on several British coins.

John was created Earl of Somerset on 10 February 1397, just a few days after the legitimation of the Beaufort children was recognised by Parliament. The same month, he was also appointed Admiral of the Irish fleet, as well as Constable of Dover Castle and Warden of the Cinque Ports. In May, his admiralty was extended to include the northern fleet. That summer, the new earl became one of the noblemen who helped Richard II free himself from the power of the Lords Appellant. As a reward, he was created Marquess of Somerset and Marquess of Dorset on 29 September, and sometime later that year he was made a Knight of the Garter and appointed Lieutenant of Aquitaine. In addition, two days before his elevation as a Marquess he married the king's niece, Margaret Holland, sister of Thomas Holland, 1st Duke of Surrey, another of the counter-appellants. John remained in the king's favour even after his older half-brother Henry Bolingbroke (later Henry IV) was banished from England in 1398.

== Later career ==
After Richard II was deposed by Henry Bolingbroke in 1399, the new king rescinded the titles that had been given to the counter-appellants, and thus John Beaufort became merely Earl of Somerset again. Nevertheless, he proved loyal to his half-brother's reign, serving in various military commands and on some important diplomatic missions. It was Beaufort who was given the confiscated estates of the Welsh rebel leader Owain Glyndŵr in 1400, although he would not have been able to take possession of these estates unless he had lived until after 1415. In 1404, he was named Constable of England.

== Family ==
John Beaufort and his wife Margaret Holland, the daughter of Thomas Holland, 2nd Earl of Kent and Alice FitzAlan, had six children. His granddaughter Lady Margaret Beaufort married Edmund Tudor, 1st Earl of Richmond, the son of Dowager Queen Catherine of Valois by Owen Tudor.

John Beaufort, 1st Earl of Somerset, died in the Hospital of St Katharine's by the Tower. He was buried in St Michael's Chapel in Canterbury Cathedral.

His children included the following:

- Henry Beaufort, 2nd Earl of Somerset (1401 – 25 November 1418)
- John Beaufort, 1st Duke of Somerset (25 March 1404 – 27 May 1444) – father of Margaret Beaufort, Countess of Richmond and Derby, mother of King Henry VII of England
- Joan Beaufort, Queen of Scotland (1404 – 15 July 1445) – married James I, King of Scots.
- Thomas Beaufort, Count of Perche (1405 – 3 October 1431)
- Edmund Beaufort, 2nd Duke of Somerset (1406 – 22 May 1455)
- Margaret Beaufort, Countess of Devon (1409–1449) – married Thomas de Courtenay, 13th Earl of Devon.

== Appointments ==
- Lord Warden of the Cinque Ports: 1398
- Admiral of the West: 1397
- Admiral of the Irish Fleet: 1397
- Lieutenant of Aquitaine: 1397
- Admiral of the North and Western Fleets: 9 May 1398 – 15 November 1399
- Lord High Constable of England: 1404
- Admiral of the North and Western Fleets: May 1406 – June 1407

== Arms ==
As a legitimised grandson of King Edward III, Beaufort bore that king's royal arms, differenced by a bordure gobony argent and azure.

Early arms of John Beaufort with a bend dexter

Beaufort arms (ancient): Royal arms of King Edward III within a bordure compony argent and azure

Beaufort arms (modern): Quarterly, 1st & 4th: Azure, three fleurs de lis or (France); 2nd & 3rd: Gules, three lions passant guardant in pale or (England); all within a bordure compony argent and azure

Arms of Beaufort, legitimised progeny of John of Gaunt, third surviving son of King Edward III: Royal arms of King Edward III within a bordure compony argent and azure (see Coat of arms of England). The arms were updated when the kings of England adopted France modern, having been adopted by the King of France in 1376. Charles, an illegitimate son of Henry Beaufort, 3rd Duke of Somerset (1436–1464), took the surname "Somerset" together with the Beaufort arms and was created Baron Herbert (1461) and Earl of Worcester (1513). In 1682 his descendant Henry Somerset, 3rd Marquess of Worcester (1629–1700), was created Duke of Beaufort. These arms are thus used by Beaufort, Duke of Somerset (extinct) and Somerset, Duke of Beaufort (extant).

== Ancestry ==
Ancestors of John Beaufort, 1st Earl of Somerset

8. Edward II of England
4. Edward III of England
9. Isabella of France
2. John of Gaunt, 1st Duke of Lancaster
10. William I, Count of Hainaut
5. Philippa of Hainault
11. Joan of Valois, Countess of Hainaut
1. John Beaufort, 1st Earl of Somerset
6. Paon de Roet
3. Katherine Swynford

== Notes ==
Political offices
Preceded by The Duke of York	Lord Warden of the Cinque Ports; 1398–1399	Succeeded by Sir Thomas Erpynham
Peerage of England
New creation	Earl of Somerset; 1397–1410	Succeeded by Henry Beaufort
